= Abandoned amusement park =

Amusement park out of use

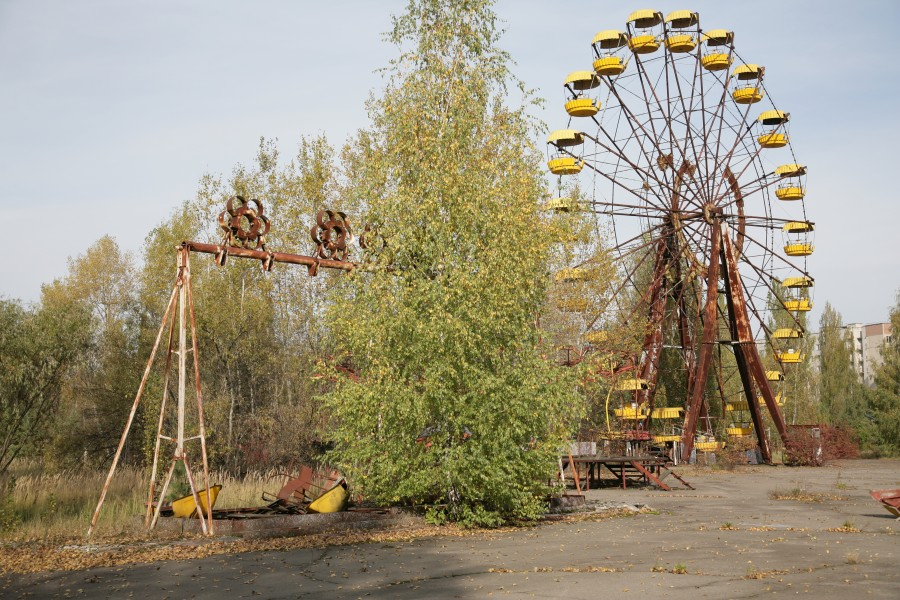
Pripyat Amusement Park, closed in 1986 after the Chernobyl nuclear disaster

An abandoned amusement park or deserted amusement park is an amusement park that is no longer in use and has become derelict, often containing remaining buildings, rides, and roller coasters. Amusement parks may be abandoned due to factors such as declining visitor numbers, accidents, war, or natural disasters.

Some abandoned amusement parks have become popular places for urban exploration and extreme tourism.

== Reasons for abandonment ==
=== Economic decline ===
Financial issues may cause amusement parks to close, and subsequently become abandoned. Crystal Beach Park, which was known for its ballroom, saw visitor numbers fall as dancehalls waned in popularity in the 1950s. After the ferry service to the park discontinued in 1956, visitors struggled to reach Crystal Beach and experienced parking issues. With the large drop in visitors, it was rendered economically unviable. The park faced bankruptcy in 1983, but continued operations for a few years before finally closing in 1989.

Another example is the Diversions Grano de Oro in Venezuela. It opened in 2001, but closed in 2018 after the 2014 global oil price collapse. The local area surrounding the park in Maracaibo became a site of theft and poverty.

=== Post-war and modernisation ===
The Second World War brought temporary and often permanent closure for many amusement parks. Josephine Kane writes that, particularly in Britain, "as new forms of entertainment emerged, the parks struggled to substantiate their claims of up-to-datedness". In post-war western society, technological advancements gave people greater pursuits for pleasure, such as car ownership, mass tourism, and home televisions. Kane argues that amusement parks struggled to compete with these types of private consumption.

Euclid Beach Park is one of many amusement parks that failed to recover and adapt to societal changes after the Second World War. The park could not compete with other nearby attractions like Cedar Point in Sandusky and Geauga Lake Park in Aurora. Rising operational costs and racial incidents led to the closure of the Euclid Beach Park on 28 September 1969. In her book exploring racial segregation at amusement parks in America, Victoria W. Wolcott cites racial bigotry as a cause for the park's financial failure, as well as an increase in vandalism in the years before 1969. Wolcott writes, "the owners shuttered exhibits, closed rides and generally neglected the grounds as their middle-class white customers sought out Cedar Point, which was now accessible from the interstate highway."

Spreepark opened in Berlin, East Germany in 1969 and was the German Democratic Republic's (Note: Formal name of East Germany) only amusement park. When the Berlin Wall fell in 1989, visitor numbers dropped significantly due to the increased competition from other theme parks now accessible in Germany. The state had previously financed the park but was no longer able to do so. As a result, the park was sold to private investor Norbert Witte. Visitor numbers remained low, and Witte criticised the council's decision to declare the Planterwald area – in which the park was situated – a conservation zone, which prevented the building of additional parking. As a result, parking on the woodland lanes incurred a fine. Spreepark filed for bankruptcy in 2001, revealing that Witte was in debt up to €15 million and that rides were in bad states of repair. The park was closed and abandoned in 2002.

=== Major disasters ===
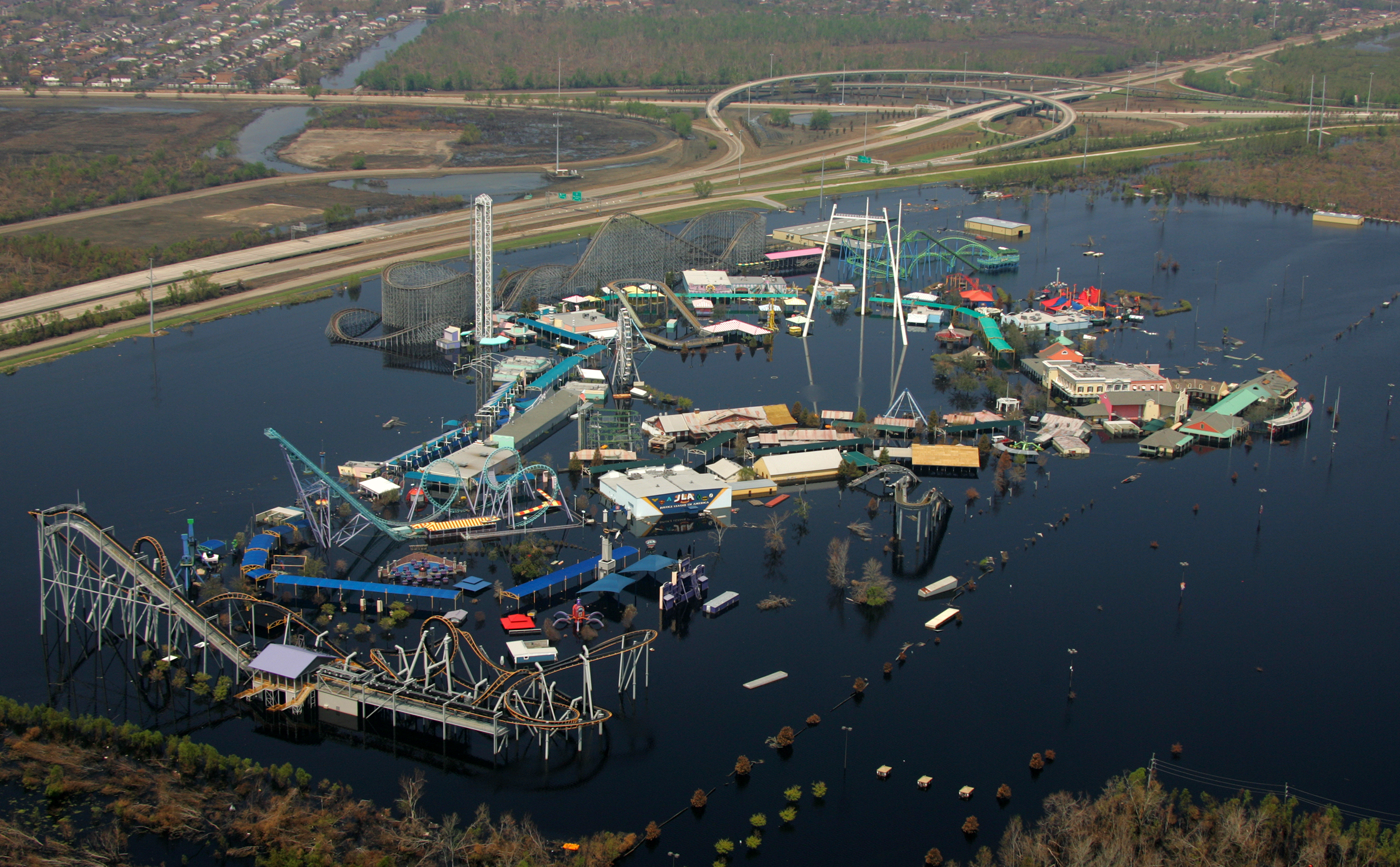
Six Flags New Orleans after Hurricane Katrina

The Pripyat amusement park was due to open on 1 May 1986 in the Ukrainian Soviet Socialist Republic (modern day Ukraine). The opening was cancelled due to radiation concerns after the Chernobyl disaster on 26 April. Areas in Pripyat, where moss exists, contain the most radiation and can emit up to 25,000 μSv/h, with high radiation levels reportedly being under the Ferris wheel.

Some theme parks have been damaged by floods. Coney Island in Cincinnati, Ohio was submerged by one of the largest floods in Ohio's history in 1937. In 2005, Hurricane Katrina devastated Six Flags New Orleans, submerging it in 8 feet of water that remained for weeks after the storm. Hurricane Ivan struck Pennsylvania in 2004, flooding and destroying Bushkill Amusement Park.

=== Accidents ===
In 2004, a young girl fell 50 feet (15 metres) from the top of the Ferris wheel at Joyland Amusement Park in Wichita, Kansas, becoming critically injured. As a result, the park closed early for the season. The number of visitors Joyland continued to decline, leading the park to permanently close in 2006.

Lake Shawnee Amusement Park in West Virginia ceased operations in 1966, after separate incidents in which two children died on the park's grounds.

A welding accident in 1984 at Idora Park, Youngstown, Ohio, damaged one of its main attractions, the Wildcat. The park was unable to remain competitive and closed that same year.

== Examples ==
=== Asia ===
Hồ Thủy Tiên Waterpark in Vietnam opened in 2004 but was closed two years later, remaining abandoned. Gulliver's Kingdom is an abandoned amusement park in Japan.

=== Europe ===
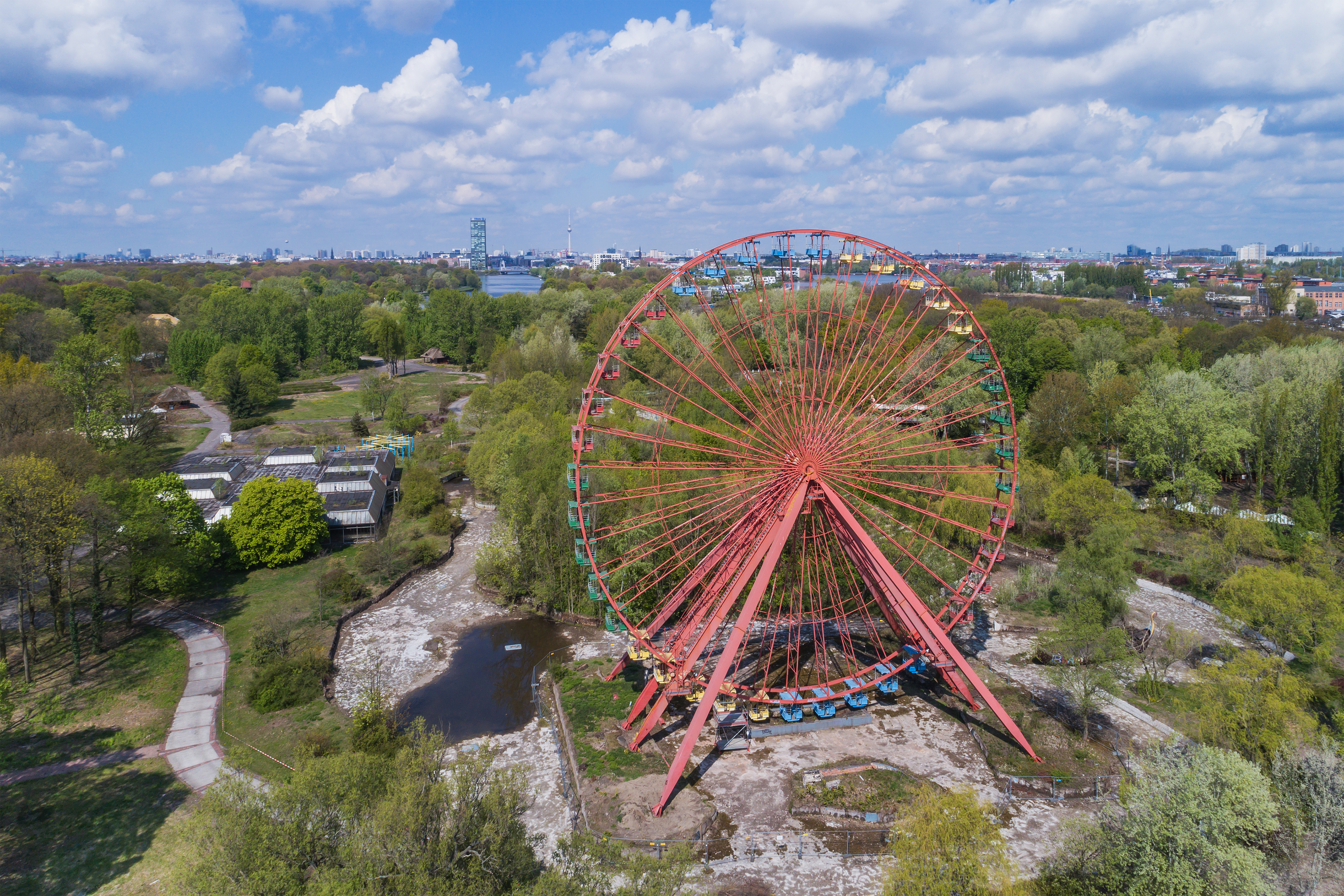
Abandoned ferris wheel at Spreepark, taken in 2017

Spreepark in Germany has been abandoned since 2002 and is a popular site for urban explorers to visit and photograph. Writing about Spreepark in a 2015 article for The Guardian, Philip Oltermann argues that people visit the site because "there is romance in decay."

Pripyat in Ukraine was scheduled to open on 1 May 1986, however, after the Chernobyl disaster, the park was abandoned. It has since become a popular site for extreme tourism.

In the United Kingdom, Crinkley Bottom, a Mr Blobby-themed park, opened in 1994 in Somerset and closed down in 1999. Its buildings were left to rot before the site was completely demolished in 2014.

Loudon Castle in Scotland opened in 1995. The park gained notoriety after a young ride operator died by falling from a roller coaster in 2007. Henk Bembom Parkware Ltd said that the park was "no longer economically viable," so the park closed and was left abandoned in 2010. The park grounds are private property and remain disused, with a few rides and structures remaining.

=== North America ===
Disney World's Discovery Island and River Country in Orlando has been abandoned since the late 1990s. It was brought to the attention of the mainstream media and public when urban explorer and photographer Seph Lawless published pictures of the park in 2016. In an interview with BBC News, Lawless criticised Disney, saying "no billion-dollar company should be powerful enough not to clear up their own mess". A potential outbreak of Zika virus the same year led Florida's governor to emphasize the danger of unremedied standing water. Shortly after, Disney entered River Country and drained and covered the abandoned pool in the park with cement.

Dogpatch USA was an amusement park in northwest Arkansas which opened in 1968 and closed in 1993. Investors planned to capitalize on the park's initial commercial success by building a sister park with a planned ski resort and convention center. However, when this venture failed, the original park closed and fell into disrepair.

=== South America ===
Diversions Grano de Oro, an amusement park in Venezuela, opened in 2001 and closed in 2018. The rides and playparks remain abandoned, and the site has since become a target for looters.

== In popular culture ==
=== Film locations ===
The 2020 documentary Closed for Storm focuses on the Six Flags New Orleans amusement park, which was abandoned after Hurricane Katrina. Six Flags New Orleans was also used as a filming location for the 2015 science fiction action film Jurassic World.

Spreepark was used as a film location for the 2011 action thriller film Hanna.

=== Games, media and literature ===
Pripyat amusement park has been featured in the video games S.T.A.L.K.E.R: Shadow of Chernobyl, Call of Duty 4: Modern Warfare, and Chernobylite.

== See also ==
- Urban exploration
- Population decline
- Extreme tourism
