= Pripyat amusement park =

Amusement park closed down after Chernobyl disaster

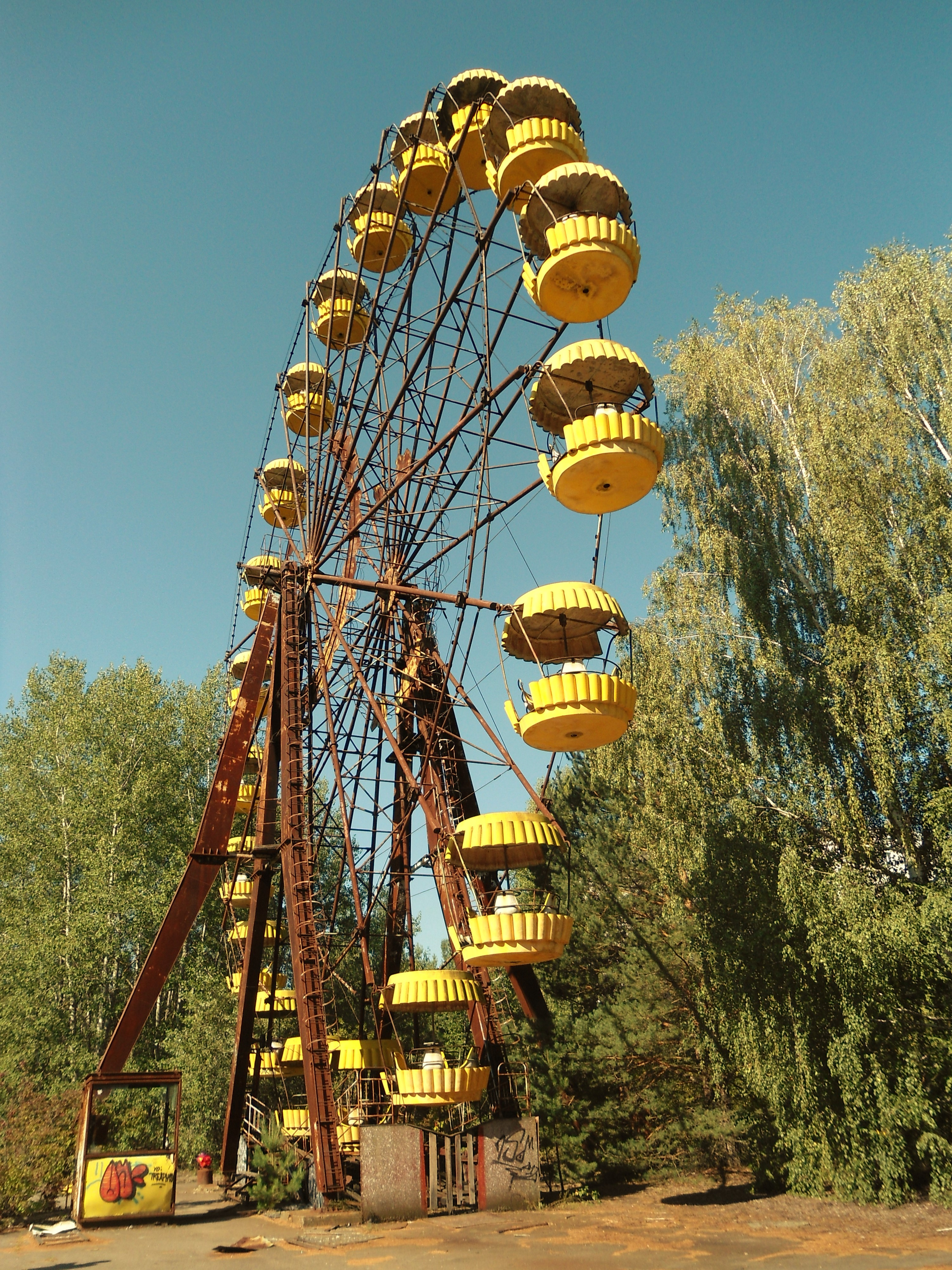
- The ferris wheel in August 2016
- Interactive map of Pripyat amusement park
- Location: Pripyat, Ukraine
- Coordinates: 51°24′29.28″N 30°3′25.65″E

Attractions
- Total: 5

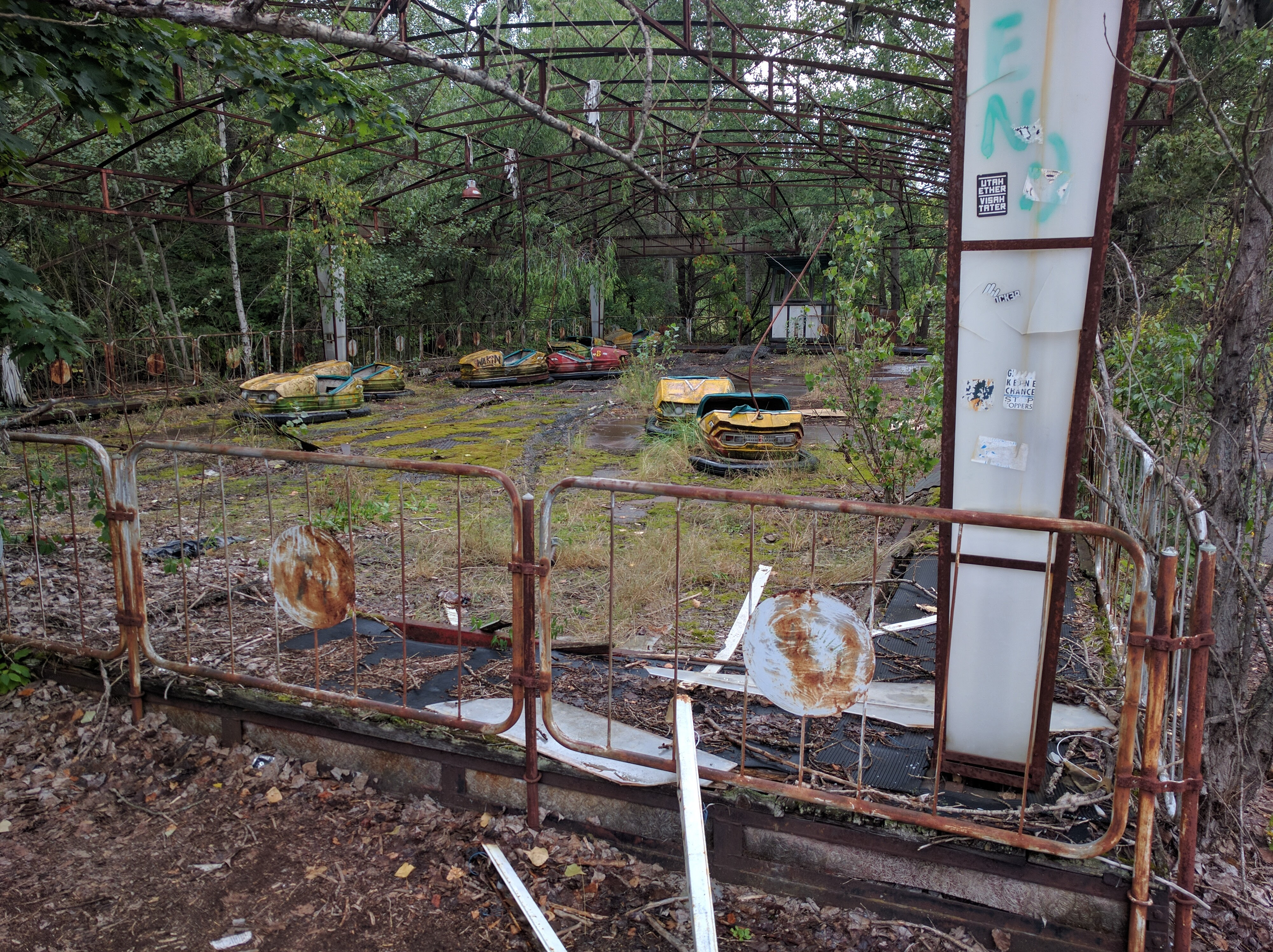
The bumper cars in 2016

The Pripyat amusement park is an abandoned amusement park located in Pripyat, Ukraine. It was to have its grand opening on 1 May 1986, in time for the May Day celebrations, but these plans were cancelled on 26 April, when the Chernobyl disaster occurred a few kilometers away. Several sources report that the park was opened for a short time on 27 April before the announcement to evacuate the city was made. These reports claim that the park was hurriedly opened to distract Pripyat residents from the unfolding disaster nearby. However, these claims remain largely unsubstantiated and unsupported. The park—and its Ferris wheel in particular—have become a symbol of the Chernobyl disaster.

== Attractions ==
Constructed under the Soviet Union as a "Парк культуры и отдыха" (Park of Culture and Rest) typical of many large cities in the then Soviet Union, the amusement park's attractions were manufactured by the Yeysk-based firm "Аттракцион" (Attraction), who were responsible for the construction of many of the amusement parks which remain to be seen around the former Soviet Union today in various states of repair.

Located north-west to the Palace of Culture in the center of Pripyat, the park had five attractions:

- The 26 m (85 ft.) ferris wheel "Круговой обзор" ('Circular Overview')
- Bumper cars "Автодром" ('Autodrome')
- Paratrooper ride "Ромашка" ('Chamomile')
- Swing boats "Русские качели" ('Russian Swing')
- The park also contained a carnival shooting game

The successor to the original company is still manufacturing the Ferris wheel, paratrooper and bumper cars to largely unaltered designs as of 2017.

== Radiation ==
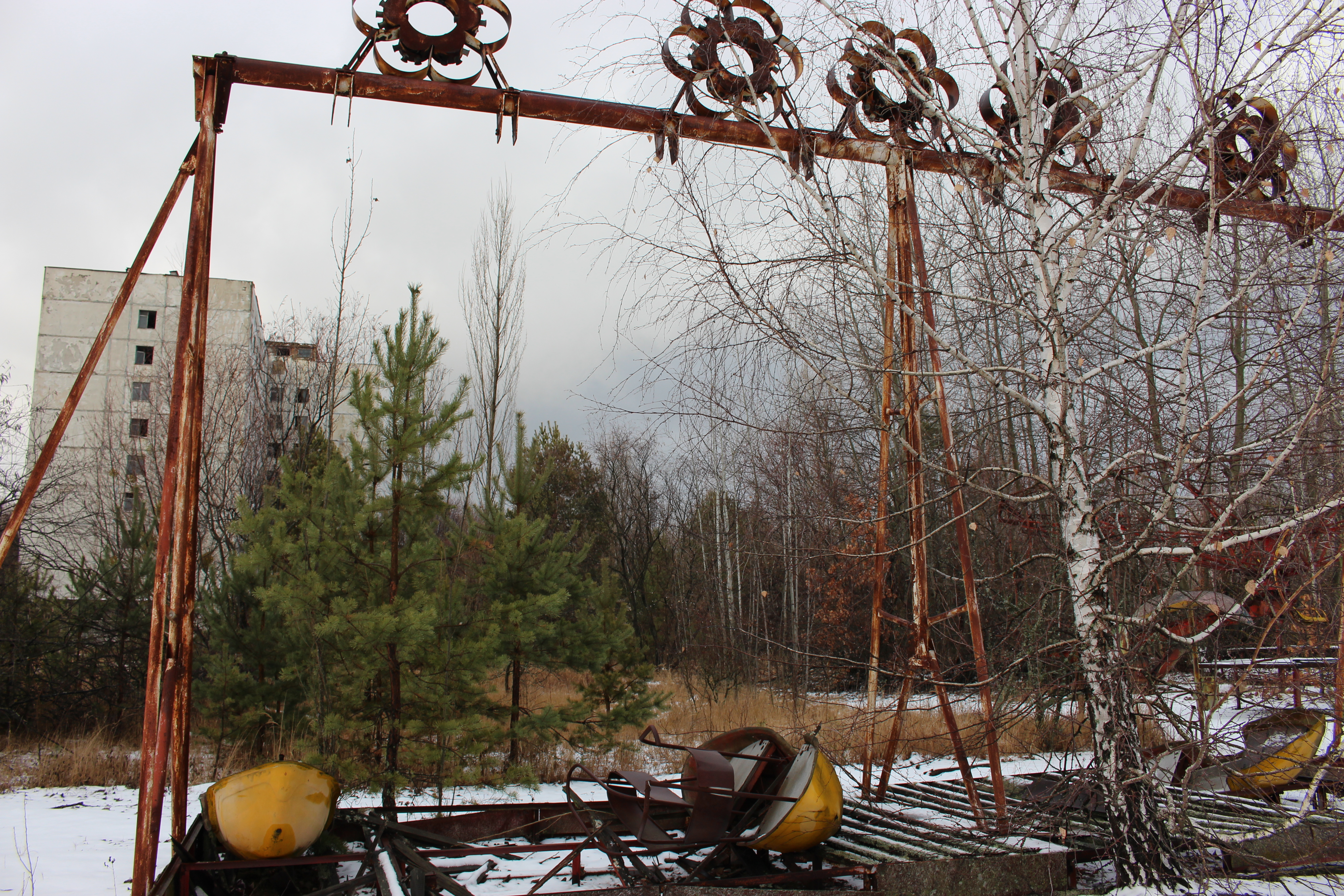
The swing boats in 2016

Radiation levels around the park vary. The liquidators washed radiation into the soil after the helicopters carrying radioactive materials used the grounds as a landing strip, so concreted areas are less radioactive. However, areas where moss has built up can emit up to 25,000 μSv/h, one of the highest levels of radiation in all of Pripyat.

== Films, games, media and literature ==
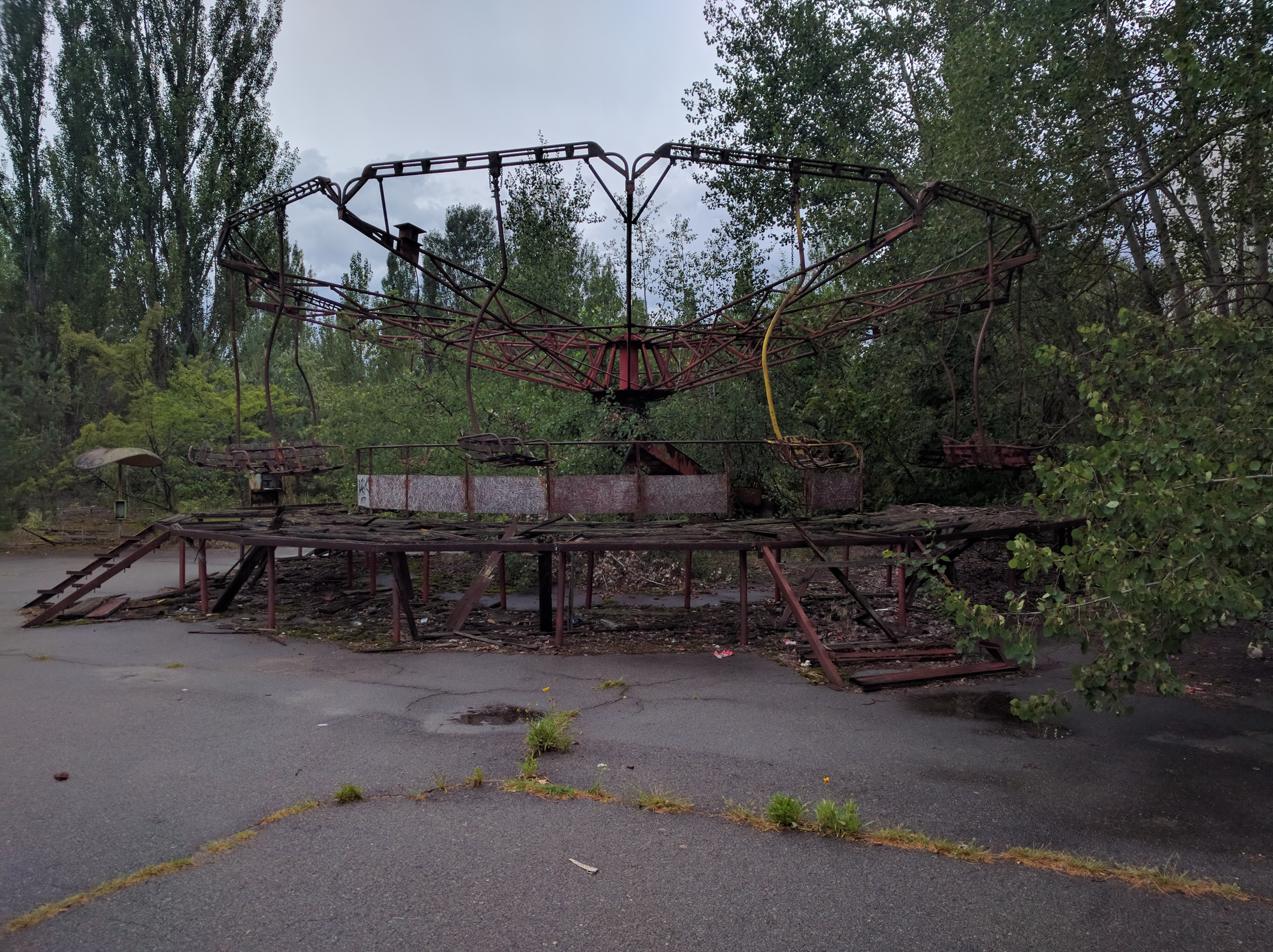
The paratrooper in 2016

The park plays significant roles in the video games S.T.A.L.K.E.R.: Shadow of Chernobyl, Call of Duty 4: Modern Warfare, Chernobylite, and Counter-Strike: Global Offensive, and the film Chernobyl Diaries.

The park plays significant roles too in Markiyan Kamysh's novel about illegal Chernobyl trips, A Stroll to the Zone.

The ferris wheel made news in September 2017 when Polish tourists turned it mechanically for the first time since 1986, later returning it to its original position.

The park appeared in Suede's music video clip, "Life Is Golden".

In the horror novel series/show The Strain, Chernobyl NPP was the birthplace of an ancient vampire and the nuclear accident was a test by another ancient to destroy his ground.

== See also ==
- List of defunct amusement parks
- Urban exploration
