= Azure Swimming Pool =

Swimming pool in Pripyat, Ukraine

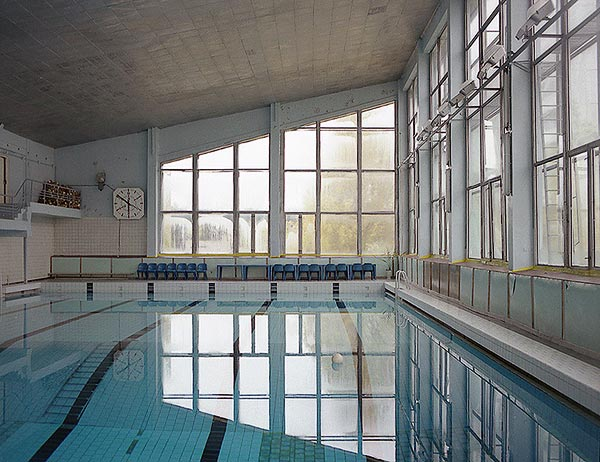
- The Azure Swimming Pool in October 1996 before its closure in 1998
- Interactive map of Azure Swimming Pool
- Address: Pripyat, Ukraine
- Coordinates: 51.4068°N 30.0492°E

Construction
- Opened: 1970s
- Closed: 1998

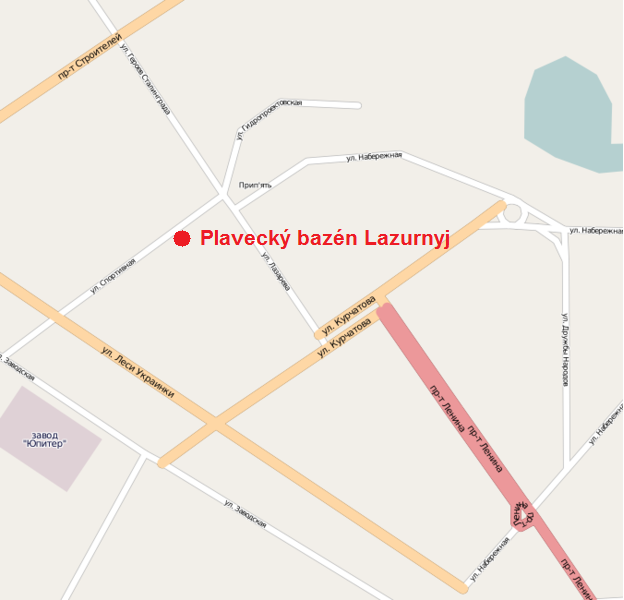
OSM locator map of the swimming pool within the city of Pripyat

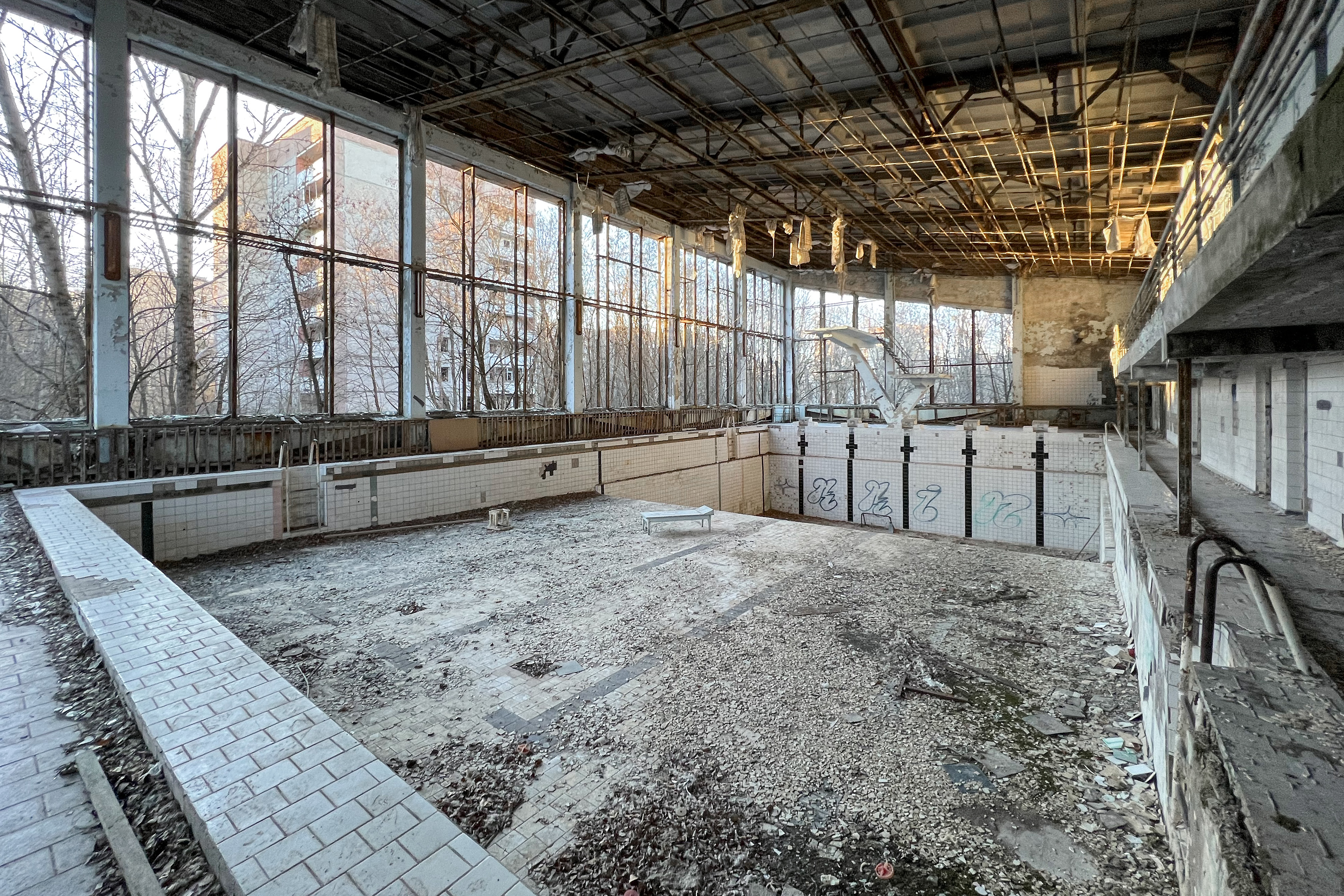
The swimming pool in 2022

The Azure Swimming Pool (Ukrainian: Басейн Лазурний) was one of the indoor swimming pools in the abandoned city of Pripyat, Ukraine, which was affected by the 1986 Chernobyl nuclear disaster.

== History ==
The complex was built in the 1970s and remained in use until 1998 (12 years after the Chernobyl nuclear disaster); during those 12 years the swimming pool was mainly used by Chernobyl liquidators. The swimming pool was considered to be one of the cleanest places in Pripyat. However, the swimming pool and the adjacent indoor basketball court have been abandoned and left to decay since its closure in 1998.

== In popular culture ==
The swimming pool appears in the following:

- Ukrainian writer Markiyan Kamysh's novel A Stroll to the Zone, which is centred around illegal trips to Pripyat
- The video game Call of Duty 4: Modern Warfare in the mission "One Shot, One Kill" and also in the multiplayer map "Bloc"
- Music video of the song "Marooned" by English rock band Pink Floyd
- Music video of the song "Sweet People" by Ukrainian singer Alyosha
- The short film Postcards from Pripyat, filmed by CBS cameraman Danny Cooke
- Chinese technology company DJI's story, Lost City of Chernobyl
- The video game PUBG: Battlegrounds
- Music video of the song "Life Is Golden", by English rock band Suede (along with other locations in Pripyat)
- The video game Warface
- The video game Call of Duty: Warzone
- The video game Metro Exodus's "Sam's Story" DLC
- The HBO miniseries Chernobyl
- At a location called 'The Storage' in the video game Second Life
- The video game Chernobylite
- The video game Counter-Strike 2 as a backdrop in the map Cache.

== Gallery ==
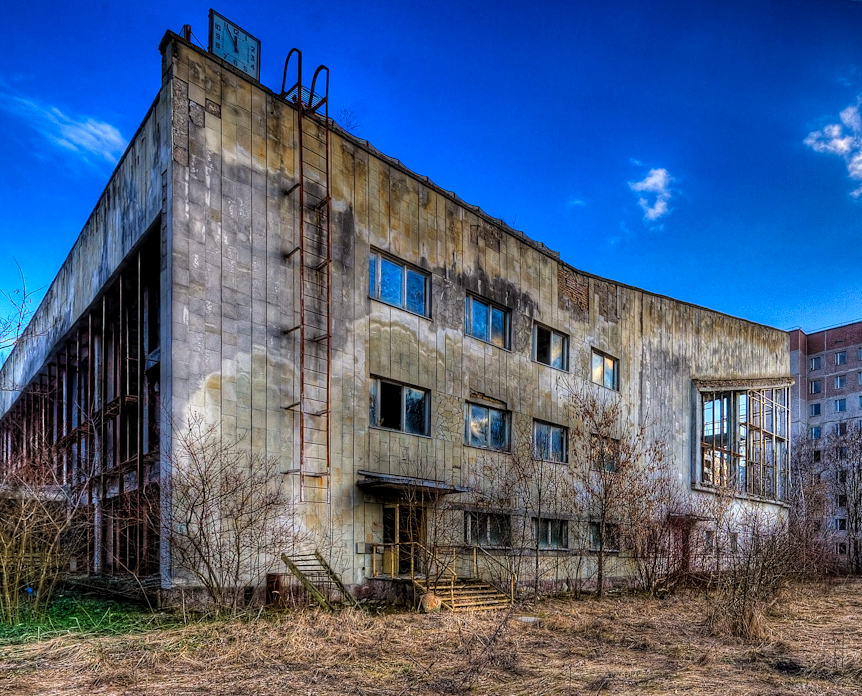
The exterior of the swimming pool in 2009

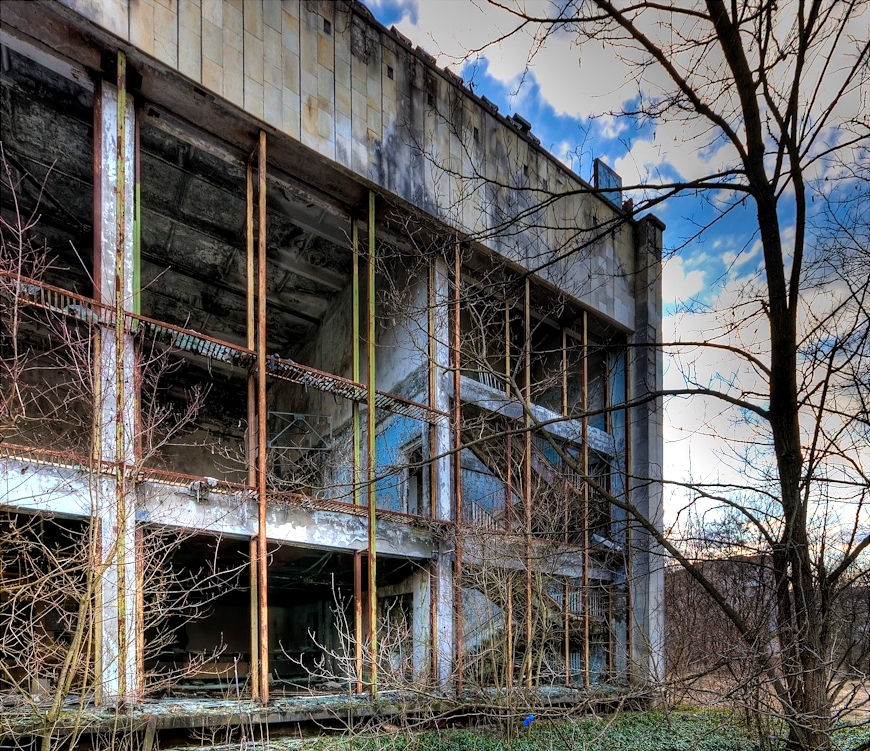
Another view of the exterior of the pool in 2009. The outdoor clock is visible in the upper right corner of the picture.

== See also ==
- Avanhard Stadium of Pripyat
- Chernobyl Exclusion Zone
