= Avanhard Stadium (Pripyat) =

Abandoned football stadium in Pripyat, Ukraine

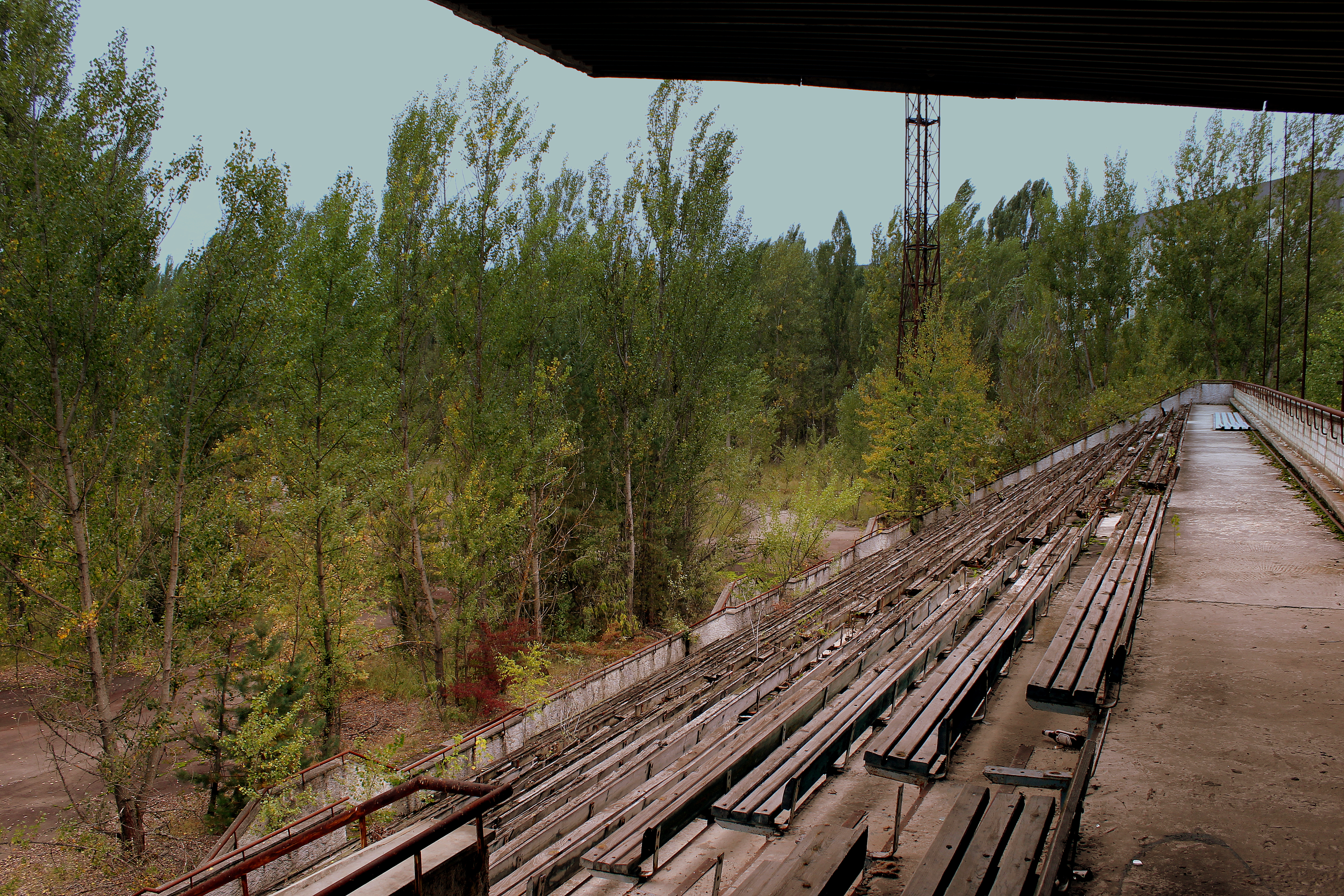
- Avanhard Stadium in 2013
- Interactive map of Avanhard Stadium
- Full name: Стадіон «Авангард»
- Location: Pripyat, Ukraine
- Coordinates: 51°24′38.1″N 30°03′15.8″E
- Owner: city administration
- Surface: Grass

Construction
- Built: 1986
- Opened: 1 May 1986; 40 years ago (planned)
- Closed: 26 April 1986; 40 years ago

Tenant
- Stroitel Pripyat

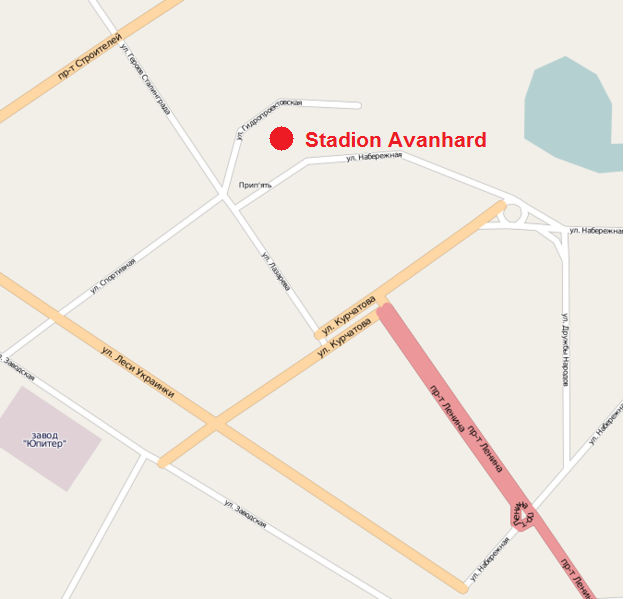
OSM locator map of the stadium within the city of Pripyat

Avanhard Stadium (Ukrainian: Стадіон «Авангард») is an abandoned football stadium in Pripyat, Ukraine. It was built to become the home ground of FC Stroitel Pripyat. Due to the Chernobyl disaster it was never realized. It was named, like several other grounds, after the Ukrainian sports society trade union. The town of Pripyat was evacuated following the Chernobyl disaster on 26 April 1986, which occurred a few kilometers away.

== In popular culture ==
- Markiyan Kamysh's novel A Stroll to the Zone is about illegal tourist trips to Pripyat.
- In S.T.A.L.K.E.R.: Shadow of Chernobyl the Avanhard Stadium makes a minor appearance as the player exits Pripyat.
- The stadium also showed in the documentary television series Life After People (2008) as a part of the story of Pripyat.

== Gallery ==
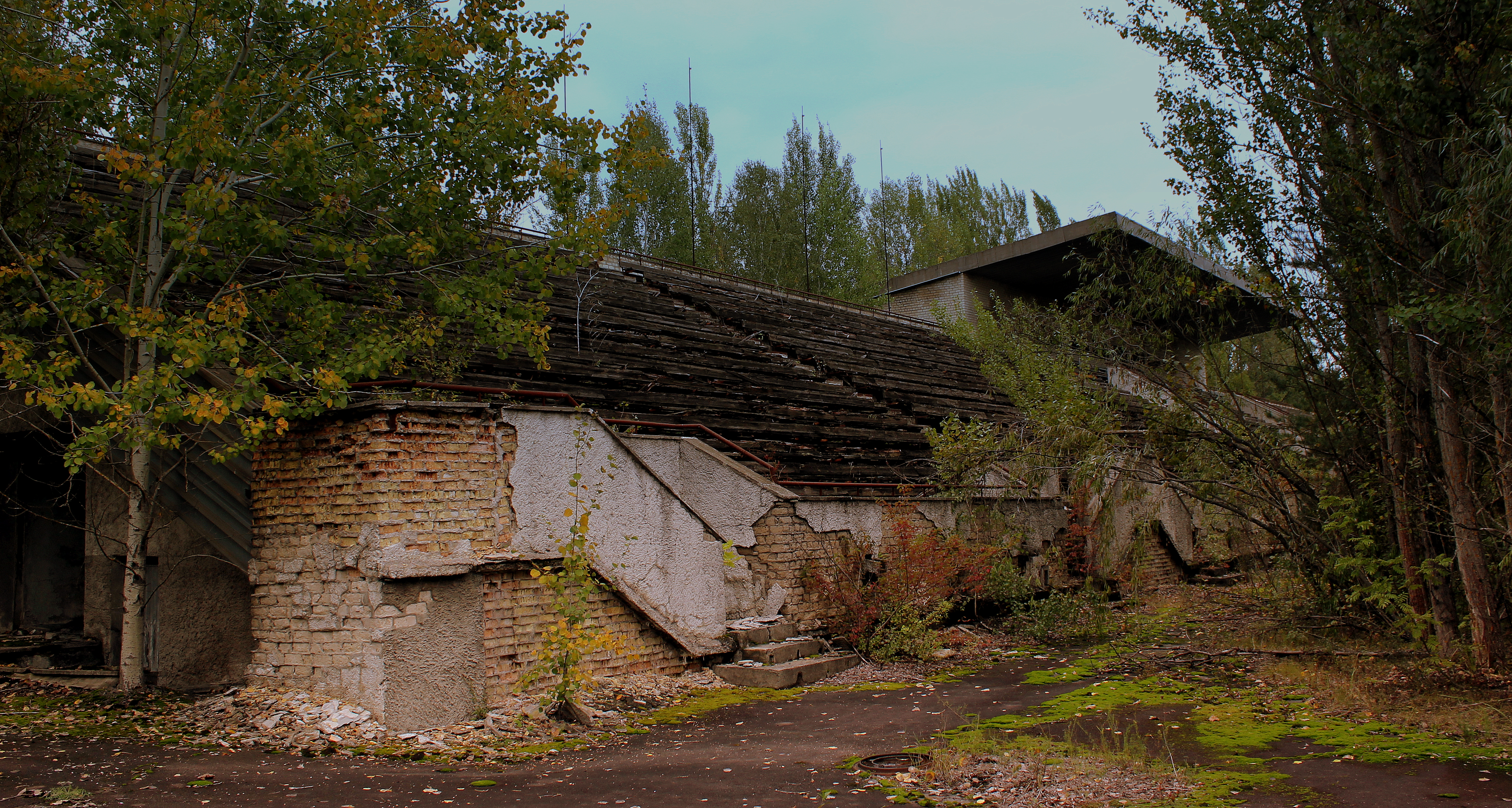
Terrace

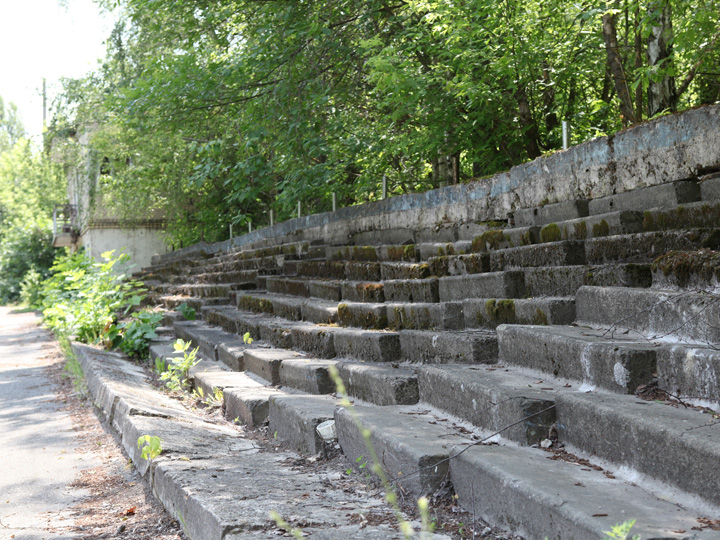
Terrace

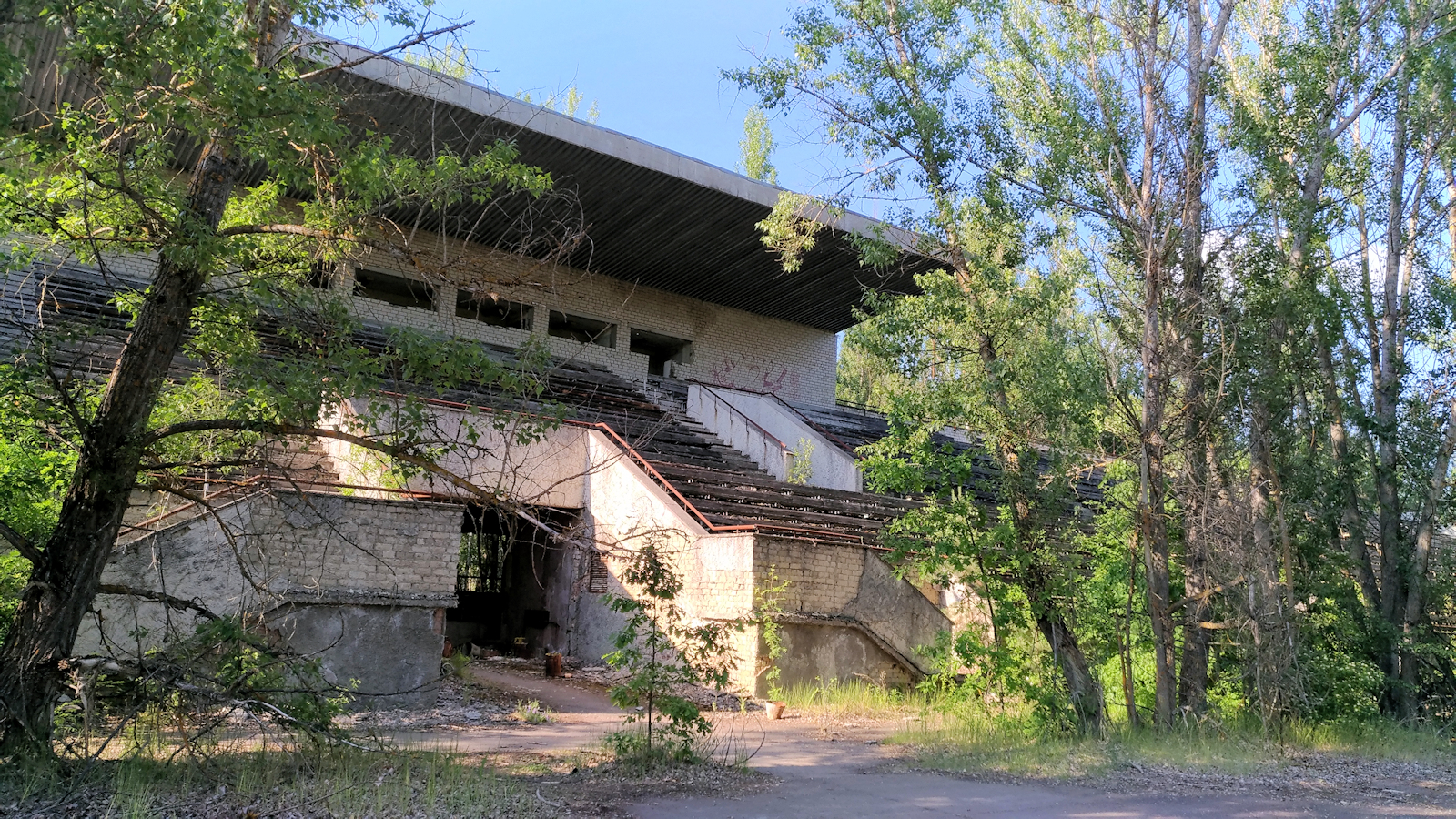
Main terrace in June 2019

== See also ==
- Azure Swimming Pool
- Chernobyl Exclusion Zone
