= Disaster convergence =

Disaster convergence is the phenomenon of individuals or groups moving towards a disaster-stricken area. Convergers have many reasons for heading towards a disaster area. Kendra and Wachtendorf (2002) identified seven distinct categories of convergers. These categories are mourners, the anxious, returners, the curious, the helpers, the exploiters, and the supporters.

== Sources ==
- Kendra, J. and Wachtendorf, T. (2002) Reconsidering Convergence and Converger - Legitimacy in Response to the World Trade Center Disaster. Research in Social Problems and Public Policy 11: 197–224.
