= Stalking the Atomic City =

Ukrainian non-fiction book

- Author: Markiyan Kamysh
- Original title: Оформляндія
- Language: Ukrainian
- Genre: Narrative non-fiction, novel.
- Publication date: 2014
- Publication place: Ukraine
- English publication date: April 05, 2022
- Pages: 160
- ISBN: 9781782278573

Stalking the Atomic City: Life Among the Decadent and the Depraved of Chornobyl (Ukrainian: Оформляндія, lit. Oformliandiia) is a memoir by Ukrainian novelist Markiyan Kamysh. It was originally published in Ukrainian in 2014, and the first English translation was published in 2022. The book is about Kamysh's experiences illegally exploring the Chernobyl Exclusion Zone.

== Synopsis ==
In the book, Kamysh relates his experiences as a "stalker" in the Chernobyl Exclusion Zone of Ukraine between 2010 and 2014. The majority of the book takes place within "The Zone," including Prypiat, Chernobyl-2, and the abandoned villages. Kamysh describes his fascination and obsession with The Zone, and how his self-described "fetish" and "addiction" persists in spite of the various dangers that he encounters while stalking.

Throughout the book, Kamysh openly discusses his complicated relationship with The Zone. He has sworn off stalking multiple times, attempting to convince himself that it is not worth the time and risk to keep returning. These attempts are always unsuccessful, and he always returns to The Zone. As a testament to this, the book concludes with the phrase "I will return again."

== Reception ==
Western critics have compared Kamysh with Hunter Thompson, Jack Kerouac and Charles Bukowski. la Repubblica included the book on their list of the ten "books of the year" for 2019. The Guardian called it "remarkable book". "Mesmerizing" from The Telegraph, "an amazing book" from Le Nouvel Obs and The Wall Street Journal called it "A punk rock pilgrimage to Chernobyl".
