= FC Stroitel Pripyat =

Stroitel Pripyat
- Full name: Football Club Stroitel Pripyat
- Founded: 1970s
- Dissolved: 1988; 38 years ago
- Ground: Avanhard Stadium, Pripyat, Ukraine
- Capacity: 5000
- Coordinates: 51°24′37.4″N 30°03′17.7″E
Home colours	Away colours

Stroitel Football Club Pripyat (Russian: Футбольный клуб «Строитель» Припять, romanized: Futbol'nyy klub "Stroitel'" Pripyat'), also known as Budivelnyk Football Club Pripyat (Ukrainian: Футбольний клуб «Будівельник» Прип'ять, romanized: Futbol'nyy klub "Budivel'nyk" Pryp'yat'), was a Soviet and Ukrainian football club from Pripyat, Kyiv Oblast. Founded in the 1970s, it competed only at republican level competitions in Ukraine. Before the Chernobyl disaster the team was playing at a small stadium in Pripyat. In 1986, a new home ground, the Avanhard Stadium (Ukrainian: Стадіон «Авангард») was built but never used due to the disaster.

== History ==
The team, which name Stroitel means "builder", was founded in the middle of the 1970s with construction of the Chernobyl Nuclear Power Station along with the atomgrad Prypiat. Many players of the new club were from the village of Chystohalivka, 4 km (2.5 mi) south of Prypiat. The idea for establishment of the team belonged to Vasiliy Kizima, the director of the Construction Administration of the Chernobyl Nuclear Power Plant. At first the team was called as Komanda posyolka Pripyat (the Pripyat town team). In 1981 Kizima invited Anatoliy Shepel to coach the team, and the team obtained its first name "Budivelnyk" (Stroitel). The team was owned by the town of Pripyat, while the Chernobyl Nuclear Power Plant had its own football team, which was called Enerhetyk Prypiat. However, the ChNPP employers played for either team.

The team competed in district (raion) and regional (oblast) competitions. In 1981, it entered the KFK competition of Ukrainian SSR. Please note, at Soviet football league system such republican football competitions (KFK championship) in 1971–1989 were conditionally at fourth tier just below the USSR Championship Vtoraya Liga, yet republican competitions, particularly football KFK, were administered by all 15 union republics individually. Since 1978 every winner of the Ukrainian football competitions among KFK were gaining promotion and obtaining the status of teams of masters.

The club achieved its best result in 1985 by reaching the second place in its group. The team never qualified for the final stage of the competition. In 1981–1983, for three years in the row, Stroitel was awarded the title of the Kyiv Oblast championship champions.

Stroitel was preparing for a cup semi-final against FC Borodyanka on the day of the Chernobyl disaster, Saturday 26 April 1986. Following the disaster, some players of Budivelnyk participated in the post-disaster clean-up and became known as "Liquidators" (as liquidators of the Chernobyl disaster results). When the city of Pripyat was abandoned after the disaster, the new city of Slavutych was founded near Chernihiv at the end of the same year to replace it. The football club was moved there, changing its name to FC Stroitel Slavutych in 1987. Its activities ceased after the end of 1988 season.

Players who also worked at the Chernobyl Nuclear Power Plant were receiving 25 Soviet rubles per game. According to Volodymyr Semykopov who played forward for Budivelnyk, the team always used formation 4–4–2.

=== Previous names ===
- 1977 AES Prypiat
- 1978 Enerhiya Prypiat

== Infrastructure and equipment ==
The team used balls manufactured by the Hungarian company "Artek", since the balls from the Soviet manufacturers were of poor quality.

Beside the city central stadium, Avanhard Stadium, that was planned to be officially opened on 1 May 1986 (the International Labor Day, the second most important holiday in the Soviet Union), Prypiat had an indoor arena where footballers were practicing and polishing their skills.

== Players ==
Alexei Alekseevich Dmitirievich (30.12.1952)

Valeriy Anatoyevich Anyukhin (09.17.1950), assistant coach to Rastorguev

Vyacheslav Yurievich Arseniyuk (12.12.1961)

Sergei Nikolayevich Bezotosny (01.06.1958)

Vladimir Nikolayevich Besedin (02.16.1952)

Sergei Vladimirovich Bondarenko (06.13.1955)

Vladimir Bordachenko

Yuri Borisovich Darchenko (07.01.1967)

Nikolai Vasilievich Gergel (01.12.1960)

Alexander Ivanovich Yatsenko (26.05.1967)

Nikolai Vladimirovich Koistrenko (09.19.1955)

Valentin Viktorivich Litvin (01.31.1960), Team Captain

Nikolai Viktorovich Litvin (11.27.1963)

Vladimir Ivanovich Panasiuk (08.07.1961)

Viktor Viktorovich Ponomarev (11.06.1955)

Vladimir Vladimirovich Schegol (01.18.198)

Volodymyr Semykopov

Mykola Skrypchenko

Sergei Slyusar (1956)

Anatoly Terendey, goalkeeper, came from Dnipropetrovsk

Vladimir Igorevich Tyutyunov (10.10.1960)

Aleksandr Vladimirovich Vishnevskiy (05.28.1962)

Wasilij Zubko (1963)

Wiktor Żylin

Stanislav Honcharenko (01.11.1960), Player from 1979 - 1981

== Head coaches ==
- 1977 Oleksiy Zhuravlyov
- 1980–1981 Anatoliy Shepel
- 1982 Viktor Yastrebov
- 1985–1986 Vladimir Rastorguev

== Honours ==
Kyiv Oblast Football Championship

- Winners (1): 1981, 1982, 1983

== League and cup history ==
Season	Division	Pos/Teams	Pld	W	D	L	GF	GA	GD	Pts	Notes
1981	4th (Ukraine)	5/(11)	32	9	7	4	21	16	+5	25	
1982	4th (Ukraine)	8/(8)	14	2	4	8	6	17	−11	8	
1983	4th (Ukraine)	6/(8)	14	5	3	6	15	16	−1	13	
1984	4th (Ukraine)	6/(8)	14	3	4	7	16	23	−7	10	
1985	4th (Ukraine)	2/(8)	14	8	4	2	35	11	+24	20	
1986	4th (Ukraine)	withdrew because of the Chernobyl accident									
1987	4th (Ukraine)	3/(9)	16	9	3	4	31	20	+11	21	(Note: Season played with the name FC Stroitel Slavutych)
1988	4th (Ukraine)	8/(12)	22	7	4	11	28	36	−8	18	

== See also ==
- FC Slavutych
- List of football clubs in Ukraine
