= Extreme tourism =

Tourism for dangerous or high-risk experiences

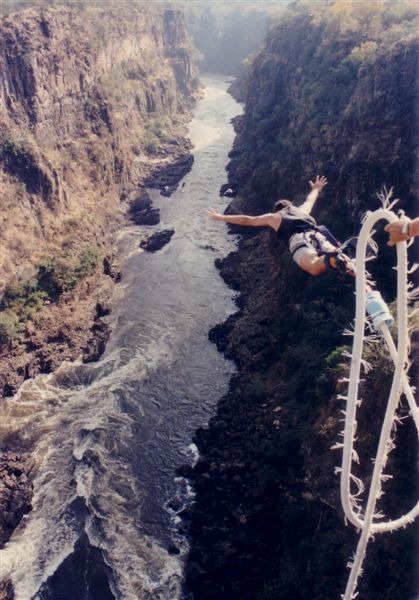
Bungee jumping off the Victoria Falls Bridge in Zambia/Zimbabwe

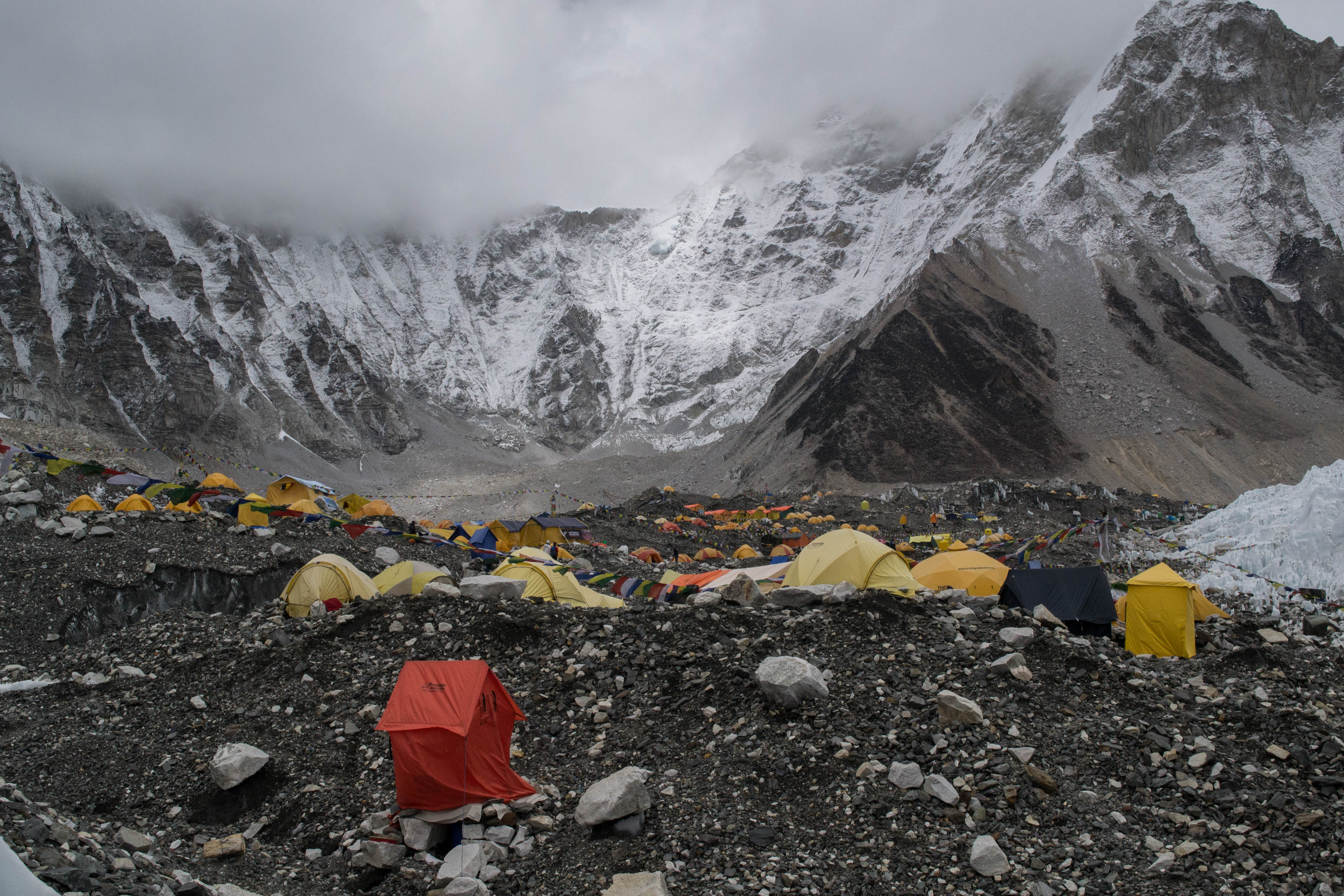
Everest base camp is a popular destination for extreme tourism.

Extreme tourism, also often referred to as danger tourism or shock tourism (although these concepts do not appear strictly similar) is a niche in the tourism industry involving travel to dangerous places (mountains, jungles, deserts, caves, canyons, etc.) or participation in dangerous events. Extreme tourism overlaps with extreme sport. The two share the main attraction, "adrenaline rush" caused by an element of risk, and differ mostly in the degree of engagement and professionalism.

Well-known extreme tourist destinations include:

- Chernobyl tours – Ukraine
- Swimming in the Devil's Pool in Victoria Falls – Zambia and Zimbabwe
- Hiking the Chang Kong Cliff Road on Mount Hua – China
- Yungas Road tours – Bolivia
- Green Zone – Baghdad, Iraq
- Sac Actun tours – Riviera Maya, Mexico
- Cave of Swallows – Mexico
- Pole of Cold – Oymyakon, Yakutia, Siberia
- Wreck of the Titanic – Atlantic Ocean
- Mount Everest – Nepal
- North Korea
- Yemen
- Afghanistan
- Russia (2022-onwards)
- Ukraine (2022-onwards)
- Belarus (2022-onwards)
- Venezuela
- Iran
- Iraq
- Somalia
- Space tourism

== See also ==
- Caving, Speleology
- Exploration
- Paragliding, Bungee jumping, Skydiving, Base jumping
- Storm chasing
- Urban exploration
- Via ferrata
- War tourism
