= Hồ Thủy Tiên =

Defunct water park in Central Vietnam

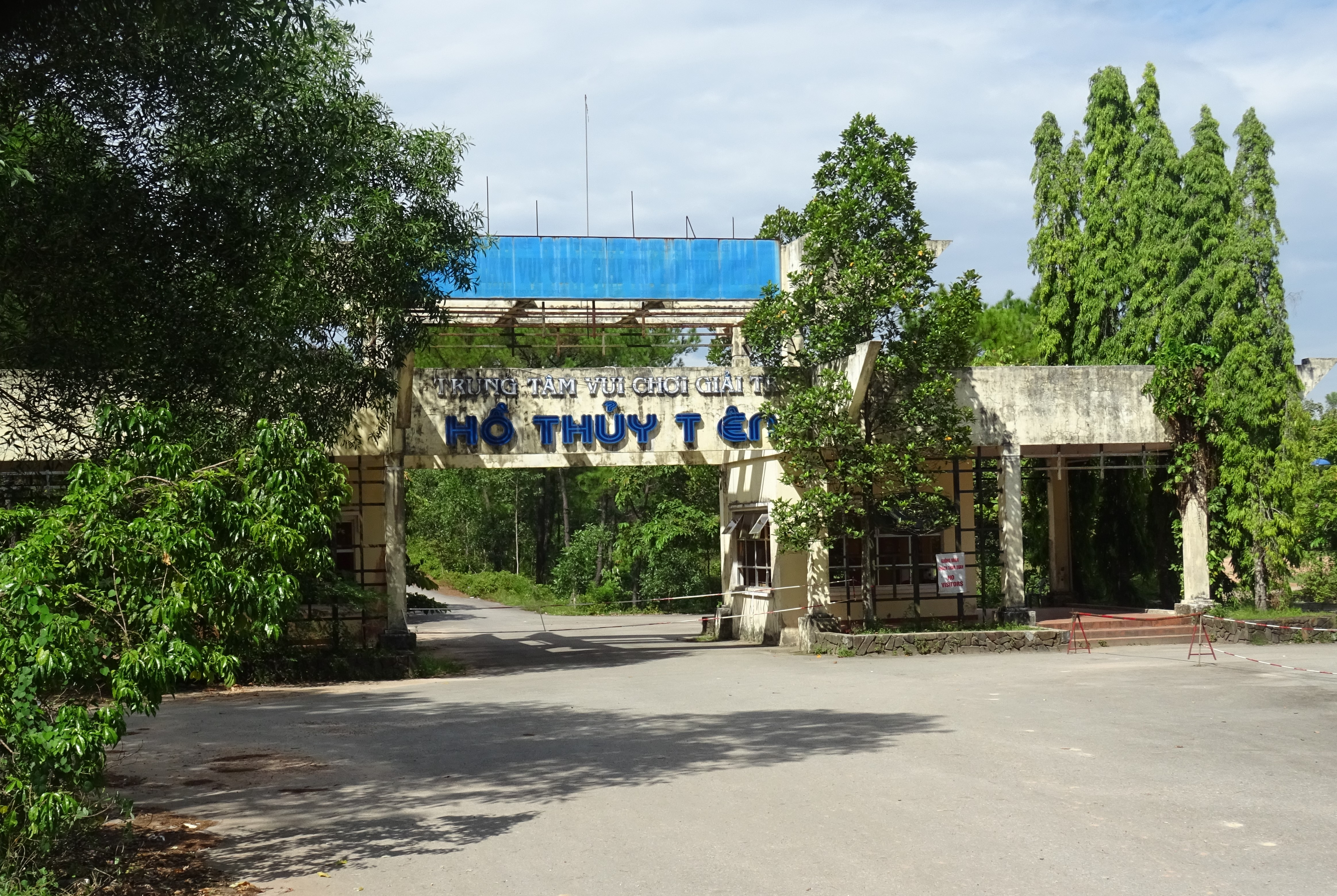
- Entrance to the water park in 2018
- Interactive map of Hồ Thủy Tiên
- Location: Thủy Bằng rural commune, Huế, Thừa Thiên Huế, Vietnam
- Owner: Thừa Thiên Huế Provincial Department of Natural Resources and Environment (present)
- Operated by: Huế Capital Tourism Company (2004)
- Opened: 2004
- Closed: 2004; 22 years ago

Hồ Thủy Tiên (lit. 'daffodil lake', also known as Thiên An park) is a community park and former water park located on the outskirts of Huế, in Vietnam. Some time after its closure in 2004, the park gained notoriety for its dilapidated state, becoming a destination for urban explorers. The Huế city government said in 2022 that it would renovate the park and reopen it in March 2023, and though this did not happen, the park could still be visited despite being closed. The property was reclaimed by the municipal authorities, who conducted restoration work and reopened it as a community park in 2025.

== History ==
Hồ Thủy Tiên, located near Thiên An hill (already a tourist attraction for its monastery and natural environment) and the lake of the same name, about ten kilometers away from the city of Huế, began construction in 2000 and opened to the public in 2004, having cost over ₫70 billion (US$3 million). Reportedly, it was only half-finished but was still relatively popular when it opened. However, the park closed down after a few months. The investment company Haco Hue took over and reopened it in 2006, with plans to create a new eco-tourism complex, but ultimately had to shut it down again by 2011, due to a lack of visitors. The province again attempted to revive the park three years later, but Haco Hue's inability to return to the project, compounded by the lack of progress on the park's upkeep, led to the provincial government reclaiming the land and prohibiting entry to the premises due to safety concerns from the now-deteriorated infrastructure.

In 2016, HuffPost ran a story on the attention the park had gained from backpackers and other tourists, which sparked wider interest in the property. Visitors described Hồ Thủy Tiên as "eerie" and "surreal". Over time, it became an "off-the-beaten-path" attraction with a unique aesthetic. Despite the prohibition on entry, locals at the gate allowed tourists in for a fee. Reportedly, crocodiles placed in the park while it was open continued to roam the premises until travelers placed pressure on animal rights organizations, causing the Vietnamese government to relocate the reptiles to a nature preserve. The park's "desolate, creepy image" led to several artists using it as a backdrop to their music videos, including Warpaint by Niki, We Must Love by ONF, and Bad Memories by Meduza and James Carter.

In 2020, the provincial government announced plans to redevelop the park, but Haco Hue's outstanding debt made it difficult to attract investors. After spending ₫20 billion ($844,100) to renovate it, the Huế city government announced the park would reopen in March 2023. However, an August 2023 article from Vietnamese state media describing it as abandoned while disclosing information on how to visit the location said that the project had not yet been implemented due to "problems related to procedures for land allocation and auction of properties left by the old investor". By 2025, the property had reverted to the municipal government, who sold off assets to pay accumulated debts and directed the Thuan Hoa District Green Park Center to renovate the location and turn it into a community park, which opened later that year. The restoration included debris removal, paving of existing paths, and the creation of new ones, including one around the namesake lake. Certain aspects, like the graffiti on a dragon statue in the middle of the lake, were preserved.
