= Pripyat =

Abandoned city in Kyiv Oblast, Ukraine

Pripyat Прип'ять
- City and ghost town
- Prypiat
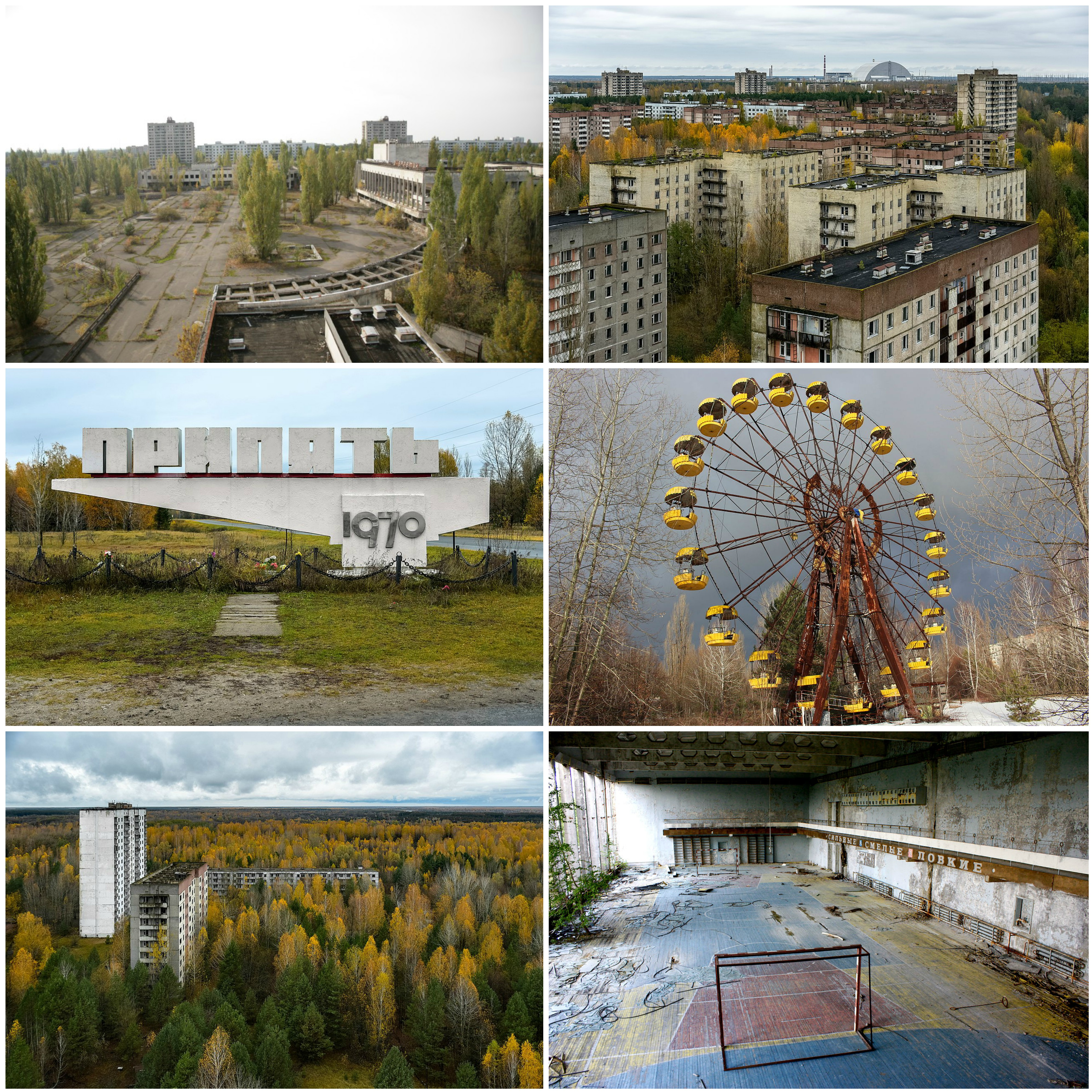
- Clockwise from top-left: Pripyat central square; apartment buildings with the Chernobyl New Safe Confinement in the distance; the Ferris wheel of the Pripyat amusement park; an abandoned sport hall; natural overgrowth at an apartment block; the Pripyat welcome sign
- Interactive map of Pripyat
- Location within Kyiv Oblast Location within Ukraine
- Coordinates: 51°24′22″N 30°3′26″E
- Country: Ukraine
- Oblast: Kyiv Oblast
- Raion: Vyshhorod Raion; Chernobyl Exclusion Zone (de facto)
- Founded: 4 February 1970
- City rights: 1979
- Abandoned: 1986
- Named for: Pripyat River

Government
  - Administration: State Agency of Ukraine on the Exclusion Zone Management

Area
  - Total: 6.59 km^{2} (2.54 sq mi)
- Elevation: 111 m (364 ft)

Population (2026)
  - Total: 0
- (c. 49,000 in 1986)
- Time zone: UTC+02:00 (EET)
  - Summer (DST): UTC+03:00 (EEST)
- Postal code: None (formerly 01196)
- Area code: +380 4499

Pripyat, (Note: /ˈpriːpjət, ˈprɪpjət/, PREE-pyət, PRIP-yət; Russian: Припять, IPA: [ˈprʲipʲɪtʲ].) also known as Prypiat, (Note: Ukrainian: Припʼять, IPA: [ˈprɪpjɐtʲ].) is an abandoned industrial city in Kyiv Oblast, Ukraine, located near the border with Belarus. Named after the nearby river Pripyat, it was founded on 4 February 1970. Residents of Pripyat worked at the nearby Chernobyl Nuclear Power Plant, north of the abandoned city of Chernobyl, after which the power plant was named. Pripyat was officially proclaimed a city in 1979 and had grown to a population of 49,360 before it was evacuated on 27 April 1986, one day after the Chernobyl nuclear disaster. The entire population of Pripyat was moved to the purpose-built city of Slavutych.

Although it is located in Vyshhorod Raion, the abandoned municipality is administered directly from the capital of Kyiv. Pripyat is supervised by the State Emergency Service of Ukraine which manages activities for the entire Chernobyl exclusion zone.

== History ==
=== Early years ===
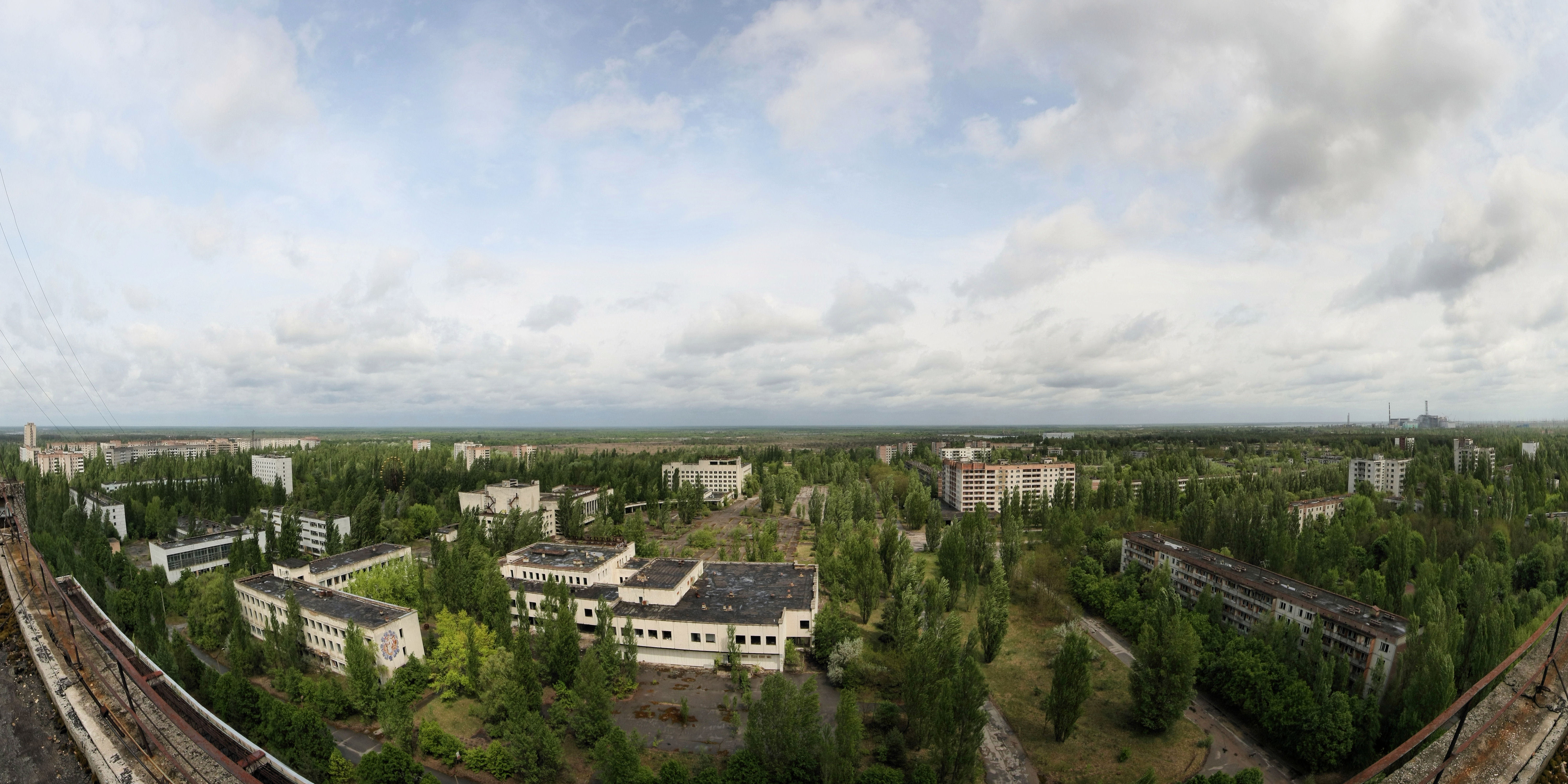
Panoramic view of Pripyat in May 2009

City diagram Neighborhood I Neighborhood II Neighborhood III Neighborhood IV Neighborhood IVa Neighborhood V City Center Medicare complex Public buildings complex Public buildings and educational buildings

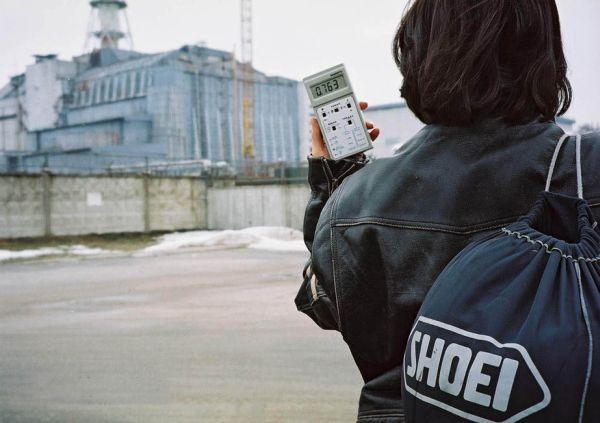
View of the Chernobyl power plant including 2003 radioactive level of 0.763 milliroentgens per hour

Access to Pripyat, unlike cities of military importance, was not restricted before the disaster as the Soviet Union deemed nuclear power stations safer than other types of power plants. Nuclear power stations were presented as achievements of Soviet engineering, harnessing nuclear power for peaceful projects. The slogan "peaceful atom" (Russian: мирный атом, romanized: mirnyy atom) was popular during those times. The original plan had been to build the plant only 25 km (16 mi) from Kyiv, but the Ukrainian Academy of Sciences, among other bodies, expressed concern that would be too close to the city. As a result, the power station and Pripyat were built at their current locations, about 100 km (62 mi) from Kyiv.

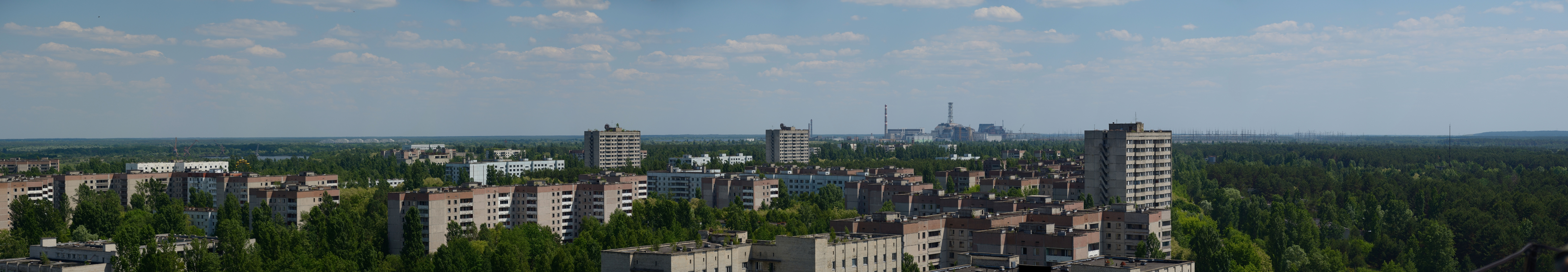
A panorama of Pripyat during summer 2011. The Chernobyl power plant, currently undergoing decommissioning, is visible in the distance, at top center.

=== Post-Chernobyl disaster ===
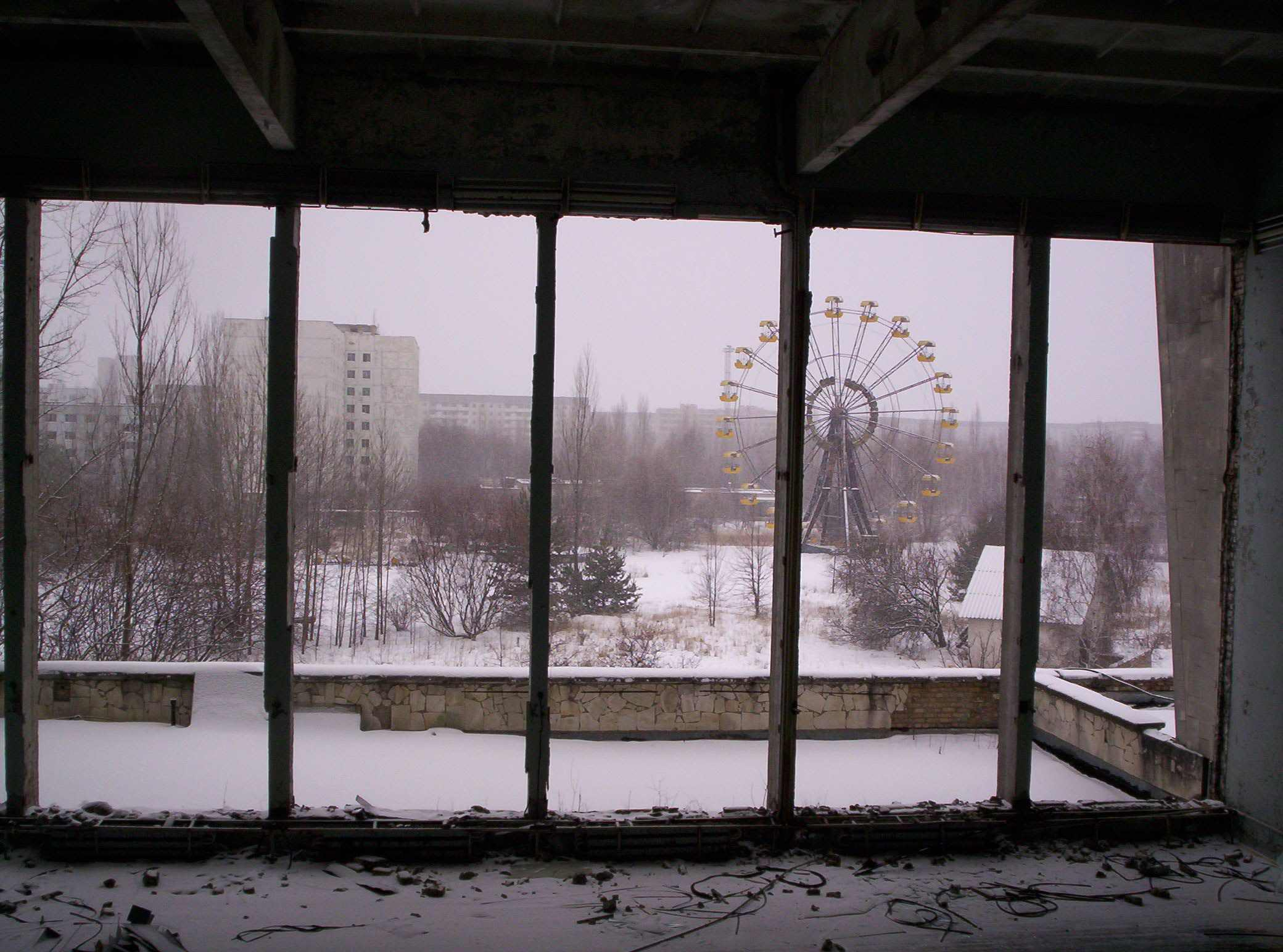
Pripyat amusement park, as seen from the City Center Gymnasium

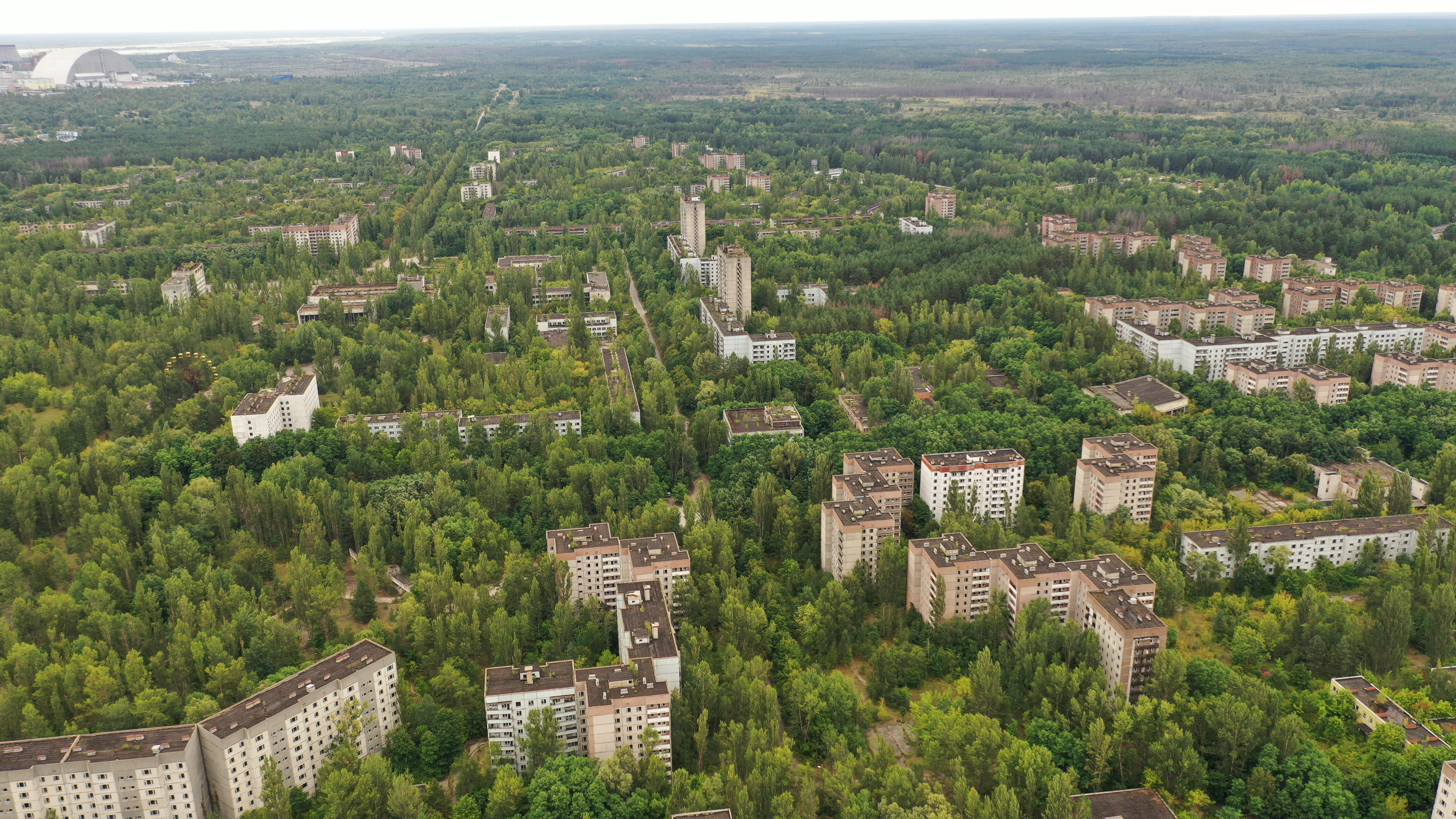
Aerial view of Pripyat in 2019, Reactor 4 of the Chernobyl Nuclear Powerplant can be seen in the top left of the photo.

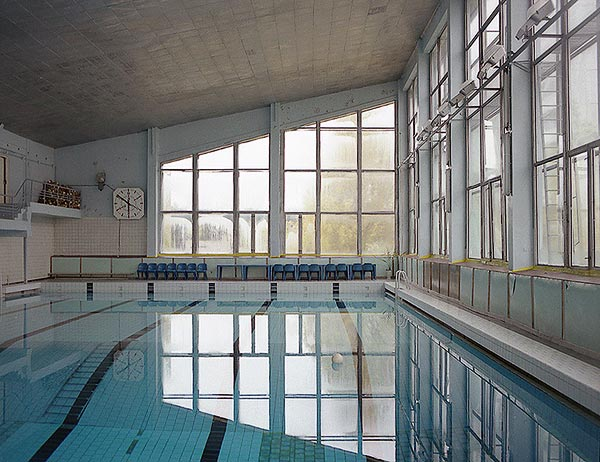
The Azure Swimming Pool was still in use by liquidators in 1996, a decade after the Chernobyl incident.

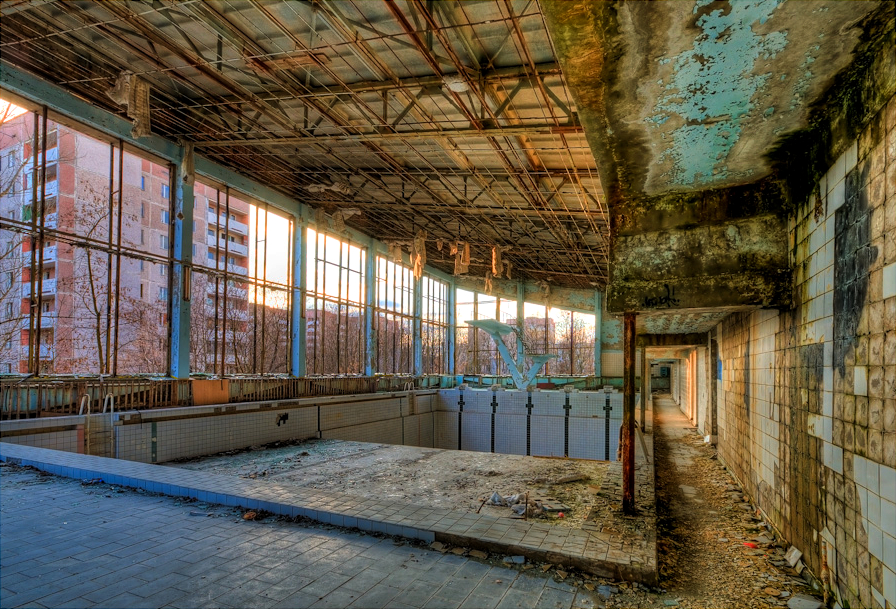
In 2009, over two decades after the Chernobyl incident, the Azure Swimming Pool shows decay after years of disuse.

In 1986, the city of Slavutych was constructed to replace Pripyat. After Chernobyl, this was the second-largest city for accommodating power plant workers and scientists in the Commonwealth of Independent States.

One notable landmark often featured in photographs in the city and visible from aerial-imaging websites is the long-abandoned Ferris wheel located in the Pripyat amusement park, which had been scheduled to have its official opening five days after the disaster, in time for May Day celebrations. The Azure Swimming Pool and Avanhard Stadium are two other popular tourist sites.

On 4 February 2020, former residents of Pripyat gathered in the abandoned city to celebrate the 50th anniversary of Pripyat's establishment. This was the first time former residents returned to the city since its abandonment in 1986. The 2020 Chernobyl Exclusion Zone wildfires reached the outskirts of the town, but they did not reach the plant.

The city was occupied by Russian forces after the Battle of Chernobyl on 24 February 2022, as part of the wider 2022 Russian invasion of Ukraine. On 31 March, Russian troops withdrew from the plant and other parts of Kyiv Oblast, with Ukrainian troops retaking control of Pripyat on 3 April.

== Infrastructure and statistics ==
The following statistics are from 1 January 1986.

- The population was 49,400. The average age was about 26 years old. Total living space was 658,700 m^{2} (7,090,000 sq ft): 13,414 apartments in 160 apartment blocks, 18 halls of residence accommodating up to 7,621 single males or females, and eight halls of residence for married or de facto couples.
- Education: 15 kindergartens and elementary schools for 4,980 children, and five secondary schools for 6,786 students.
- Healthcare: one hospital could accommodate up to 410 patients, and three clinics.
- Trade: 25 stores and malls; 27 cafes, cafeterias, and restaurants collectively could serve up to 5,535 customers simultaneously. Ten warehouses could hold 4,430 tons of goods.
- Culture: the Palace of Culture Energetik; a cinema; and a school of arts, with eight different societies.
- Sports: 10 gyms, 10 shooting galleries, three indoor swimming-pools, two stadiums.
- Recreation: one park, 35 playgrounds, 18,136 trees, 33,000 rose plants, 249,247 shrubs.
- Industry: four factories with annual turnover of 477,000,000 rubles. One nuclear power plant with four reactors (plus two more planned).
- Transportation: railway, 167 urban buses, plus the nuclear power plant car park with 400 spaces.
- Telecommunication: 2,926 local phones managed by the Pripyat Phone Company, plus 1,950 phones owned by Chernobyl power station's administration, Jupiter plant, and Department of Architecture and Urban Development.

=== Transport ===
The city was served by Yaniv station on the Chernihiv–Ovruch railway. It was an important passenger hub of the line and was located between the southern suburb of Pripyat and Yaniv. An electric train terminus of Semikhody, built in 1988 and located in front of the nuclear plant, is currently the only operating station near Pripyat connecting it to Slavutych.

== Safety ==
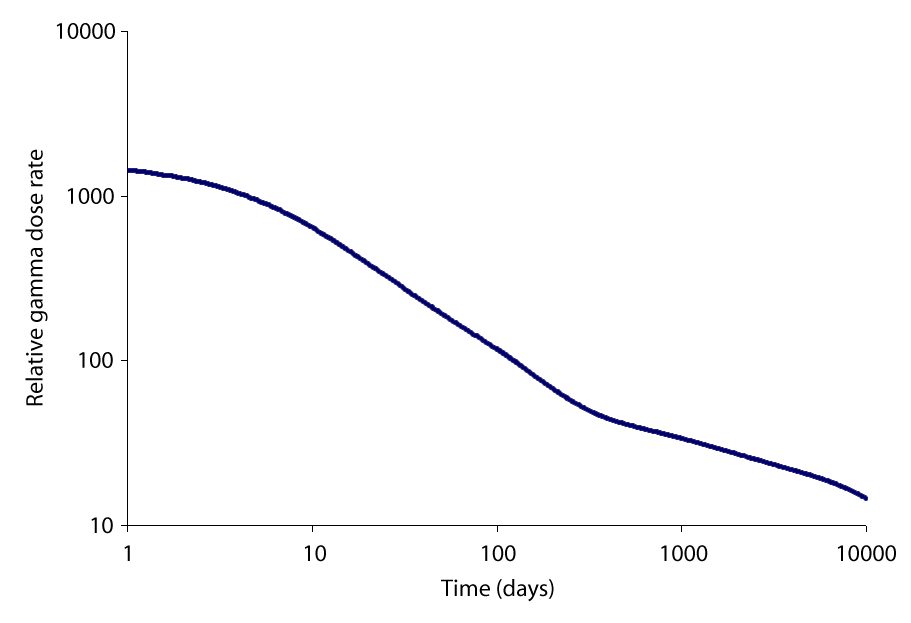
The external relative gamma dose for a person in the open near the Chernobyl disaster site. The intermediate lived fission products like Cs-137 contribute nearly all of the gamma dose now after a number of decades have passed, see opposite.

The impact of the different isotopes on the radioactive contamination of the air soon after the accident. Drawn using data from the OECD report and the second edition of 'The radiochemical manual'.

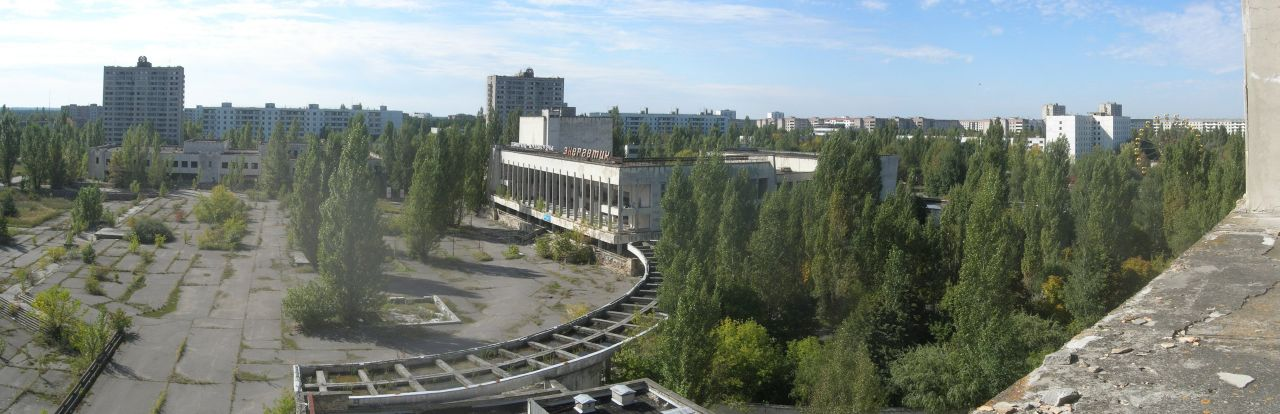
Pripyat 2007

A concern is whether it is safe to visit Pripyat and its surroundings. The Zone of Alienation is considered relatively safe to visit, and several Ukrainian companies offer guided tours around the area. In most places within the city, the level of radiation does not exceed an equivalent dose of 1 μSv (one microsievert) per hour.

Unrelated to the 1986 nuclear disaster, but still very much a safety concern, is the ongoing Russian invasion of Ukraine; Russian forces briefly occupied the Chernobyl area in 2022, before being forced out again by the Armed Forces of Ukraine.

== Climate ==
The climate of Pripyat is designated as Dfb (Warm-summer humid continental climate) on the Köppen Climate Classification System.

Climate data for Pripyat
| Month | Jan | Feb | Mar | Apr | May | Jun | Jul | Aug | Sep | Oct | Nov | Dec | Year |
|---|---|---|---|---|---|---|---|---|---|---|---|---|---|
| Mean daily maximum °C (°F) | −3 (27) | −1.4 (29.5) | 3.7 (38.7) | 13.2 (55.8) | 20.3 (68.5) | 23.5 (74.3) | 24.6 (76.3) | 23.9 (75.0) | 18.8 (65.8) | 11.8 (53.2) | 4.3 (39.7) | −0.1 (31.8) | 11.6 (53.0) |
| Daily mean °C (°F) | −6.1 (21.0) | −4.7 (23.5) | 0.1 (32.2) | 8.4 (47.1) | 14.8 (58.6) | 18.0 (64.4) | 19.1 (66.4) | 18.4 (65.1) | 13.7 (56.7) | 7.8 (46.0) | 1.8 (35.2) | −2.6 (27.3) | 7.4 (45.3) |
| Mean daily minimum °C (°F) | −9.1 (15.6) | −9 (16) | −3.5 (25.7) | 3.7 (38.7) | 9.3 (48.7) | 12.6 (54.7) | 13.7 (56.7) | 12.9 (55.2) | 8.6 (47.5) | 3.8 (38.8) | −0.7 (30.7) | −5.1 (22.8) | 3.1 (37.6) |

== Notable people ==
- Markiyan Kamysh (born 1988) writer, illegal Chernobyl explorer
- Vitali Klitschko (born 1971) politician, mayor of Kyiv and former professional boxer
- Wladimir Klitschko (born 1976) former professional boxer
- Alexander Sirota (born 1976) photographer, journalist and filmmaker
- Lyubov Sirota (born 1956) poet, writer, playwright, journalist and translator

== In popular culture ==
=== Films ===
(Alphabetical by title)

- The horror film Chernobyl Diaries (2012) was inspired by the Chernobyl disaster in 1986 and takes place in Pripyat.
- The majority of the film Land of Oblivion (2011) was shot on location in Pripyat.
- Pripyat is featured in the History Channel documentary Life After People.
- The drone manufacturer DJI produced Lost City of Chernobyl (May 2015), a documentary film about the work of photographer and cinematographer Philip Grossman and his five-year project in Pripyat and the Zone of Exclusion.
- Filmmaker Danny Cooke used a drone to capture shots of the abandoned amusement park, some residential shots of decaying walls, children's toys, and gas masks, and collected them in a 3-minute short film Postcards From Chernobyl (released in November 2014), while making footage for the CBS News 60 Minutes episode "Chernobyl: The Catastrophe That Never Ended" (early 2014).
- With the help of drones, aerial views of Pripyat were shot and later edited to appear as a deserted London in the film The Girl with All the Gifts (2016).
- The documentary White Horse (2008) was filmed in Pripyat.

=== Literature ===
(Alphabetical by artist)

- Markiyan Kamysh's novel, Stalking the Atomic City: Life Among the Decadent and the Depraved of Chornobyl, is about illegal trips to the Chernobyl Exclusion Zone.
- The Chernobyl Poems of Lyubov Sirota by the professor of Washington University Paul Brians
- Lyubov Sirota’s novel "The Pripyat Syndrome"; Language: English, Publisher: Independently published (18 February 2021), Paperback: 202 pages, ISBN 979-8710522875 – Lyubov Sirota (Author), Birgitta Ingemanson (Editor), Paul Brians (Editor), A. Yukhimenko (Illustrator), Natalia Ryumina (Translator)
- Much of the James Rollins' novel The Last Oracle takes place in Pripyat and around Chernobyl. The story revolves around a team of American "Killer Scientist" special agents who must stop a terrorist plot to unleash on the world the radiation of Lake Karachay, during the installation of the new sarcophagus over the Chernobyl nuclear power plant.
- The exclusion zone is the setting for Karl Schroeder's science fiction short story "The Dragon of Pripyat".

=== Music ===
(Alphabetical by artist)

- The Ukrainian singer Alyosha recorded most of the video for her Eurovision 2010 entry, "Sweet People", in Pripyat.
- Ash, the rock band from Northern Ireland, has a song titled "Pripyat" included in their album A–Z Vol.1.
- The Italian Rapper Caparezza has a song titled "Come Pripyat" on his album Exuvia, released in 2021.
- The song "Dead City" (Ukrainian: Мертве Місто) by the Ukrainian symphonic metal band DELIA is about Pripyat, and scenes from the music video were shot in the city. DELIA's vocalist, Anastasia Sverkunova, was born in Pripyat just before the Chernobyl disaster.
- In 2006, musician Example featured Pripyat in his 18-minute documentary of the ghost town and in his promotional video for his track, "What We Made".
- German composer and pianist Hauschka included a piece titled "Pripyat" on his 2014 album Abandoned City (on which each track is titled after a different abandoned place.)
- The Scottish post-rock band Mogwai included a song titled "Pripyat" on their album Atomic (2016), which is a soundtrack to Mark Cousins' documentary Atomic, Living in Dread and Promise.
- The Belarusian post-punk band Molchat Doma released a music video for their song titled, "Waves" (Russian: Волны) as part of their album Etazhi. The music video was filmed in Pripyat through a series of varying drone shots; displaying famous landmarks of the abandoned city.
- The Irish folk-rock singer Christy Moore included a song called "Farewell to Pripyat" on his album Voyage (1989), the song credited to Tim Dennehy.
- In 2014, for the twentieth anniversary of Pink Floyd's The Division Bell, a music video for the song "Marooned" was produced and released on the anniversary box set of the album. Aubrey Powell of Hipgnosis directed the video, filming some parts in Pripyat during the first week of April 2014.
- Marillion guitarist Steve Rothery's first solo album is titled The Ghosts of Pripyat (2014).
- The Australian rapper Seth Sentry included the two-part song "Pripyat" in his album Strange New Past (2015).
- The English rock band Suede used the city to shoot their music video clip Life Is Golden, including takes of the Azure Swimming Pool, Pripyat amusement park, and Polissya hotel.

=== Television ===
(Alphabetical by series)

- The 60 Minutes episode "Chernobyl: The Catastrophe That Never Ended" (early 2014) aired on CBS.
- HBO's drama miniseries Chernobyl (2019) is based on the Chernobyl Nuclear Disaster. The scenes set in 1986 Pripyat were filmed in Vilnius, Lithuania.
- in the Chris Tarrant: Extreme Railways Season 5 episode "Extreme Nuclear Railway: A Journey Too Far?" (episode 22), Chris Tarrant visits Chernobyl on his journey through Ukraine.
- Discovery Science Channel's Mysteries of the Abandoned episode "Chernobyl's Deadly Secrets", produced and hosted by Philip Grossman, was filmed over a four-day period in Pripyat and the Chernobyl Nuclear Power Plant, in 2017.
- The Animal Planet nature investigation series River Monsters conducted an extensive 2013 investigation within Pripyat, the exclusion zone, and the Chernobyl Power Plant in search of a radioactive mutated wels catfish.
- A Life on Our Planet, a documentary by David Attenborough, depicts natural life in Pripyat.

=== Video games ===
- Call of Duty 4: Modern Warfare's (and its remaster's) single-player campaign includes levels "All Ghillied Up" and "One Shot, One Kill", which are set in Pripyat.
- The S.T.A.L.K.E.R. franchise is set around the Chornobyl exclusion zone, and prominently features Pripyat in the series, namely in S.T.A.L.K.E.R.: Call of Pripyat.
- SCUM, developed by the Croatian studio Gamepires, features a radiation area than includes a fictional city of "Krsko," which is an accurate reproduction of Pripyat, including points of interest.
- Chernobylite, developed by The Farm 51, allows players to explore the city and points of interest.
- Counter-Strike 2 features a map based on Pripyat, including notable buildings such as the Polissya Hotel and the Pripyat amusement park.

== See also ==
- Cultural impact of the Chernobyl disaster
- FC Stroitel Pripyat
