= Chang Kong Cliff Road =

Walkway in Shaanxi, China

Coordinates: 34°28′37.23″N 110°4′46.32″E

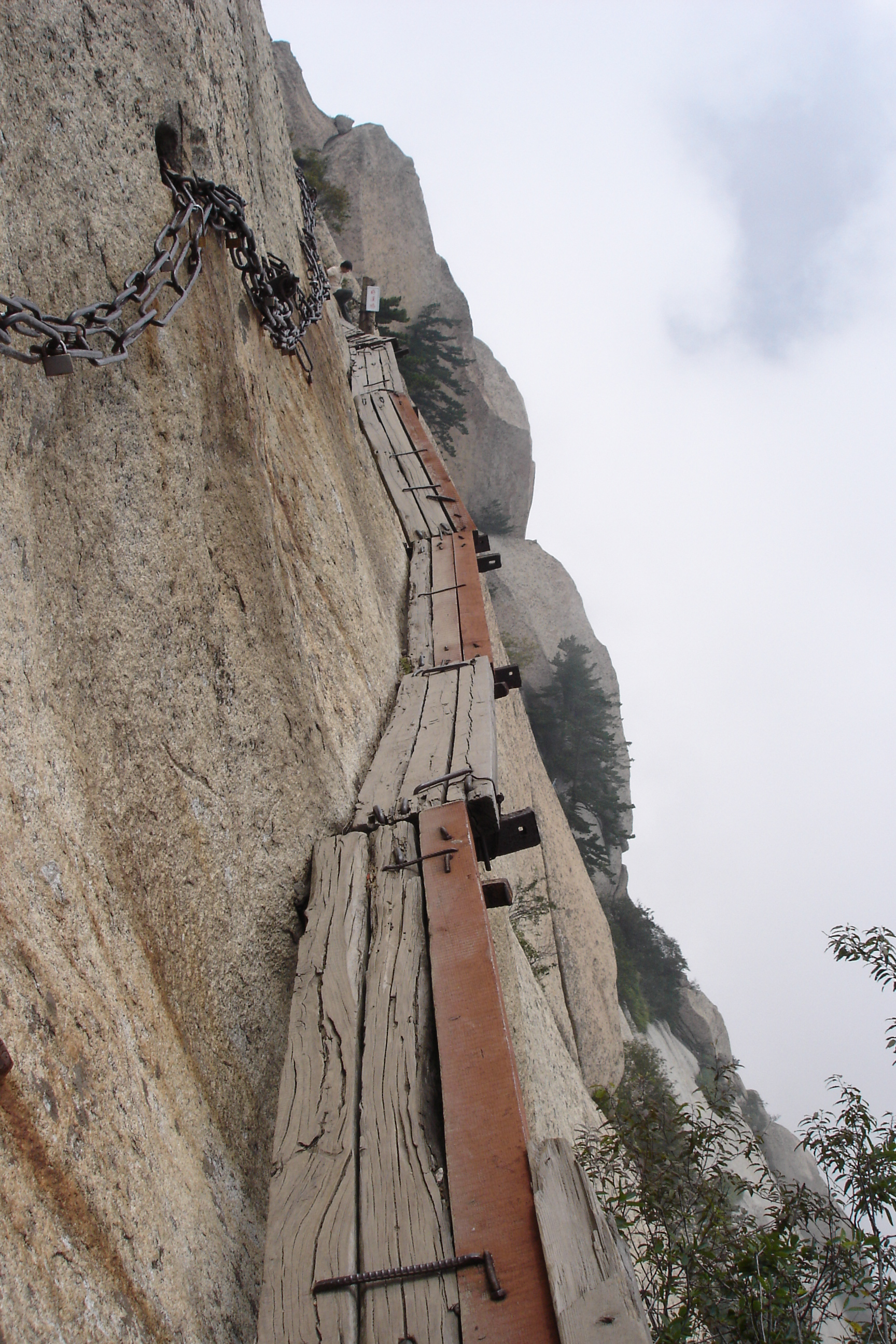
Walkway by Mount Hua

Chang Kong Cliff Road is a cliff hiking road in China. The cliff walkway is reached by climbing steep stairs. It is located in Shaanxi Province, China, at the edge of Mount Hua.

The Cliff road is believed to have been created in the 13th century, during the Yuan Dynasty, by followers of He Zhizhen, the first master of the Mount Hua Sect of Taoism. The monks were seeking immortals who were believed to dwell in the mountains.

The walkway is made of wooden boards, nailed together and installed on a series of iron pegs driven into the sheer mountain cliff thousands of metres above the ground. Some sections of the walkway are only 30 cm wide. Some sections are cut into the cliff rock.

The walkway is popular with visitors, but, because a number of fatalities have occurred, tourists and others wanting to negotiate the walkway are required to wear safety harnesses. The walkway is traveled even in winter and, in order to arrive in time to view the sunrise, many choose to traverse it at night. After setting out, a walker must continue to the end, because the narrowness of the path prohibits two-way traffic.
