= Markiyan Kamysh =

Ukrainian novelist

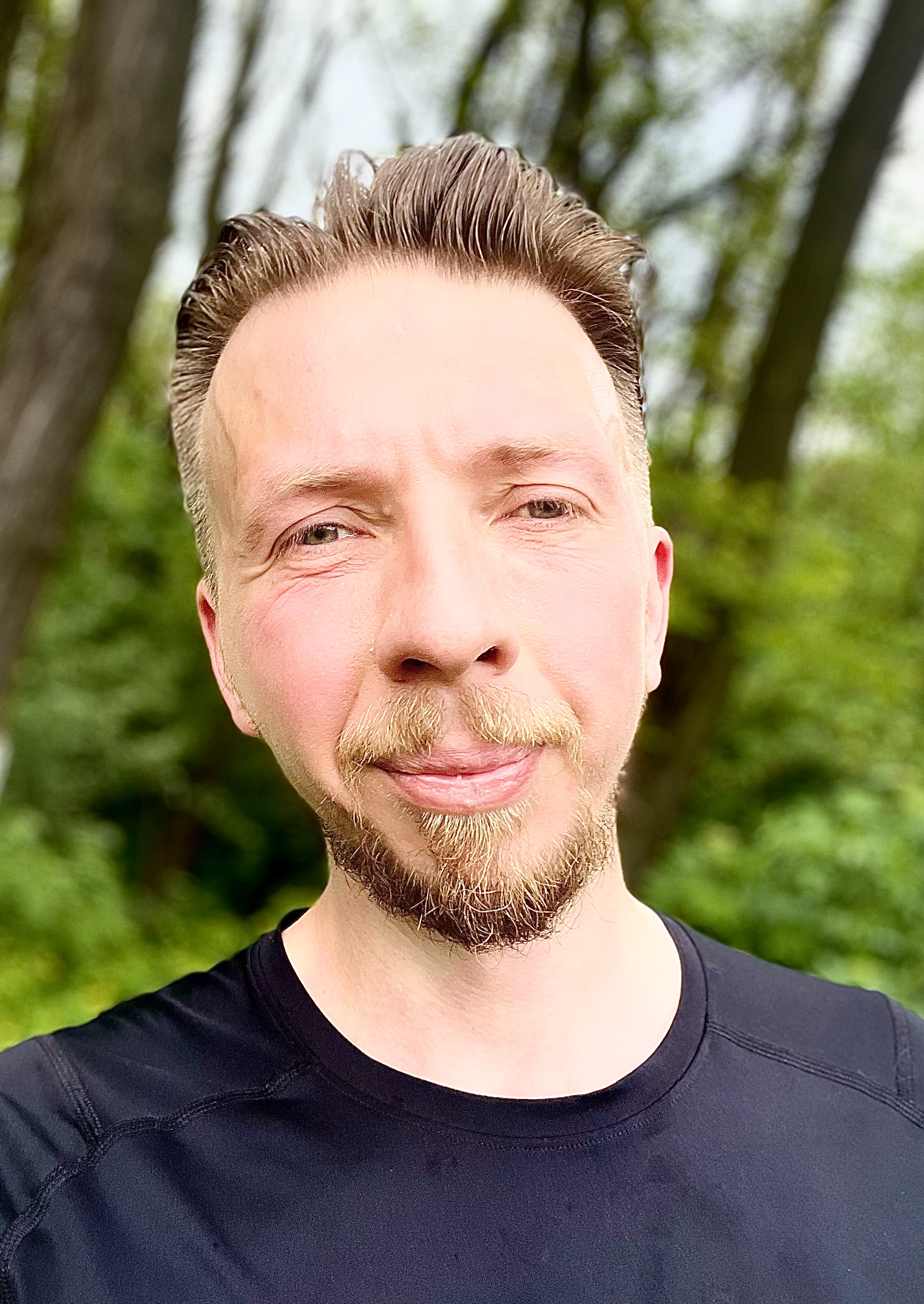
- Born: 19 October 1988 (age 37); Kyiv, Ukrainian SSR, Soviet Union
- Occupation: Novelist
- Writing career
- Language: Ukrainian
- Genre: Ukrainian literature
- Notable works: Stalking the Atomic City: Life among the decadent and the depraved of Chornobyl
- Website: www.polesianzen.com

Markiyan Kamysh (Ukrainian: Маркіян Камиш, born 19 October 1988) is a Ukrainian novelist, best known for his works about the Chernobyl nuclear power plant and its environs.

== Biography ==
Kamysh's father was a Chernobyl liquidator. From 2005-2009, Kamysh studied history at the Taras Shevchenko National University of Kyiv. He is the author of seven novels, the most famous of which are works about and around Chernobyl. From 2010–2021, he was an illegal stalker (he calls himself a "pilgrim") of multiple areas in the Chernobyl Nuclear Power Plant Zone of Alienation, including Pripyat, smaller surrounding villages, and the power plant itself. In 2022, after the Russian invasion began, he joined the Ukrainian military and was retired in September, 2024.

=== Stalking the Atomic City ===
Stalking the Atomic City is an account written by Kamysh about his experiences illegally exploring the exclusion zone.

Western critics have compared Kamysh with Hunter Thompson, Jack Kerouac and Charles Bukowski. la Repubblica included the book on their list of the ten "books of the year" for 2019. The Guardian called it "remarkable book". "Mesmerizing" from The Telegraph, "an amazing book" from Le Nouvel Obs and The Wall Street Journal called it "A punk rock pilgrimage to Chernobyl".
