= Disaster tourism =

Tourism at locations of environmental disaster

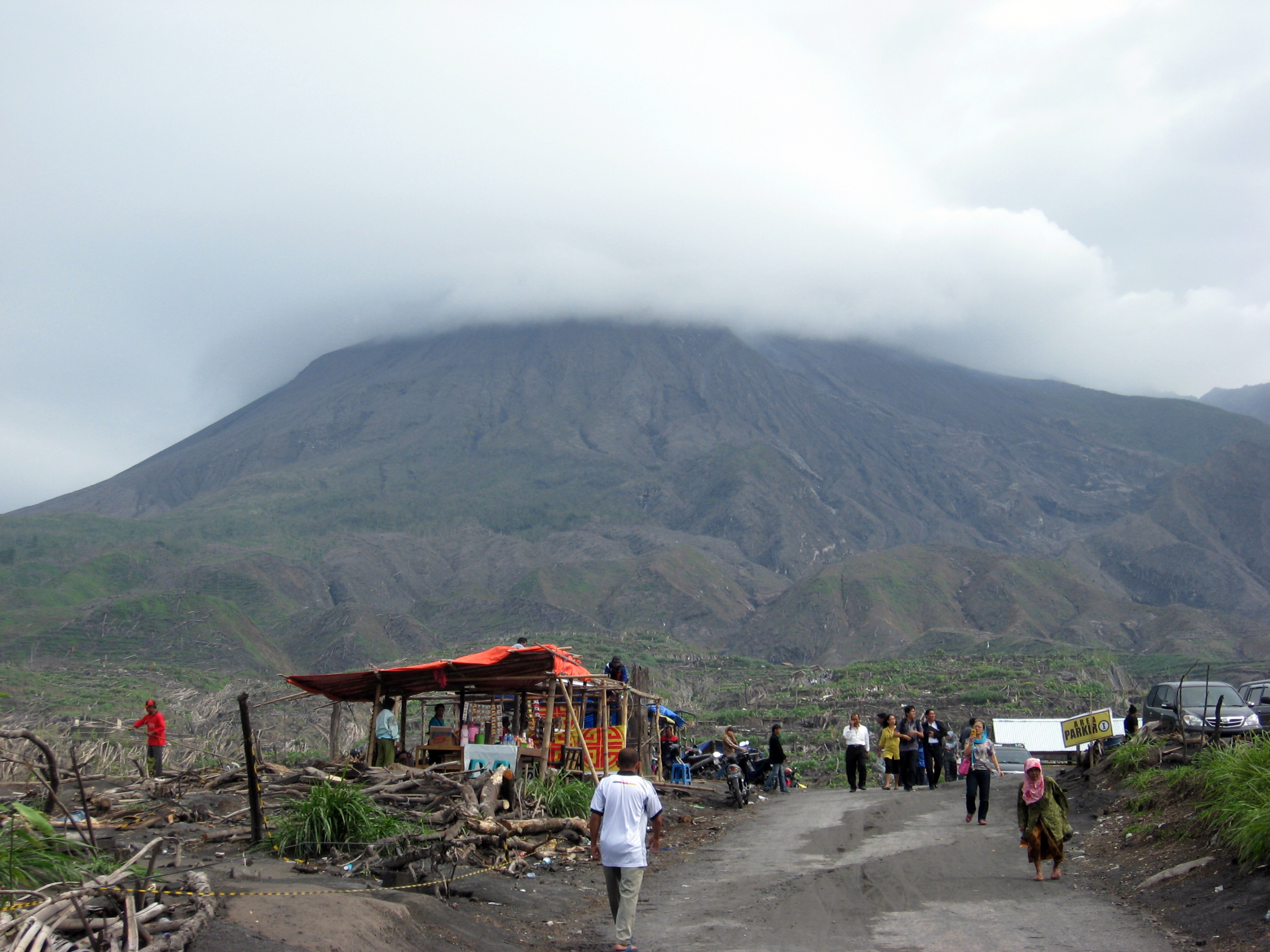
Disaster tourism at Mount Merapi, after the 2010 eruptions

Disaster tourism is the practice of visiting locations at which an environmental disaster, either natural or human-made, has occurred. Although a variety of disasters are the subject of subsequent disaster tourism, the most common disaster tourist sites are areas surrounding volcanic eruptions.

Opinions on the morality and impact of disaster tourism are divided. Advocates of disaster tourism often claim that the practice raises awareness of the event, stimulates the local economy, and educates the public about the local culture, while critics claim that the practice is exploitative, profits on loss, and often mischaracterize the events in question.

== Motivations ==
An article by Smartertravel defines the motivations present in individuals practicing disaster tourism. Attraction is typically derived from personal connection in a social, academic or cultural essence. Another population of visitors hope to aid in providing relief to the affected areas—some directly through volunteer work and some indirectly through donations.

Other visitors have no connection to the site or the event, but happen to be there as tourists and visit those places as part of their sightseeing. A common example of this is tourists who come to Italy to sightsee in Rome and end up visiting Pompeii and its neighboring cities without initially intending to do so.

== Reception ==
Disaster tourism has had a mixed reception. Critics label it as voyeuristic and profiting off of loss, while advocates argue that tourism stimulates the recovering economy and brings awareness to local culture. Although the public perception of tourism depends on a wide variety of factors, such as whether the disaster was human-made or natural and how long it has been since the incident, there are some general trends in the reception of tourism.

Depending on the site or tour, disaster tourism can be seen to be an educational experience or exploitative. Whether or not a tourist site is handled respectfully and tactfully often is determined both by those organizing the events and the tourists themselves. Moreover, advocates of disaster tourism point out that attractions can educationally re-examine disasters despite the operators being motivated by profit. Many of these advocates argue that when distasteful disaster tourism occurs, the blame lies primarily on the tourists for providing an insensitive demand rather than on the operators for fulfilling such a demand. For both tourists and operators, however, parsing the difference between an educational and an exploitative one requires asking what areas are crucial for understanding the disaster and clarifying how behavior that is appropriate in a destroyed area is often different from the behavior that is appropriate in newly built homes or temporary camps.

The effect of tourism on the local economy is often nuanced due to the specifics of how tourism affects local income. It is generally accepted that if the tours comprise public events organized by volunteers, then there are consistent but small increases to charity donations. However, if the tours are organized by private companies, then it is not always clear how what proportion of the profits go back into relief efforts. Furthermore, while governmental regulation typically prevents private tours from slowing down or reversing reconstruction in areas where reconstruction has already begun, critics argue that private touring may de-incentivize the reconstruction of locations and sites, in which reconstruction has yet to occur. Another possible situation is that the tours are not organized by formal entities but instead by less cohesive groups of citizens. These cases are relatively unstudied due to their rarity.

Similarly, visiting disaster sites is thought to affect empathy, but the nature of the effect it has depends on the particulars of the visit. Unorganized visits, for example, can often raise empathy by forcing the visitors to see suffering up close and prompting them to consider how to interact with victims. On the other hand, more organized visits have been accused of lowering empathy because they comprised tourists "acting like tourists and dressing like tourists," which dilutes and sanitizes the experience.

In the immediate aftermath of a disaster, rescue efforts are often hampered by people who come to see and photograph the site, rather than take part in it. An example of this is that of Kavalappara, Kerala, where a landslide occurred in 2019, with emergency vehicles blocked in due to the vehicles of visitors. This led to widespread criticism, and authorities demanded that unnecessary visits to Kavalappara be avoided.

== Virtual reality ==
=== Facebook's virtual tour of Puerto Rico ===
In September 2017, Hurricane Maria devastated the Dominican Republic and Puerto Rico. Hurricane Maria is estimated to caused 3,059 deaths total, and in Puerto Rico, it is estimated to have caused $90 billion in property damage and displaced approximately 60,000 people.

On October 9, 2017, Facebook CEO Mark Zuckerberg and Facebook social VR chief Rachel Franklin used a livestream to showcase Facebook’s new virtual reality app, Facebook Spaces, by taking a virtual tour of the devastated areas of Puerto Rico. During the 10 minute video, Zuckerberg explains how Facebook partnered with Red Cross to build a population map from satellite imagery and better allocate the relief effort.

The public reception to the tour was unanimously negative. Zuckerberg drew criticism for describing VR as "magical" in its ability to transport people to disaster zones, and most viewers considered the cartoon avatars of Zuckerberg and Franklin to be an inappropriately jovial tone. The day following the livestream, Zuckerberg apologized, explaining, "When you're in VR yourself, the surroundings feel quite real. But that sense of empathy doesn't extend well to people watching you as a virtual character on a 2D screen."

== Examples ==
=== 79 AD eruption of Mount Vesuvius ===
When the nearby volcano Mount Vesuvius erupted in 79 AD, the eruption buried the city of Pompeii and the nearby city of Herculaneum and preserved everything from its streets to its frescoes under mounds of pumice and ash. Although Pompeii was initially rediscovered in 1599, tourism was undesirable until Spanish engineer Rocque Joaquin de Alcubierre performed a much larger excavation in 1748, which revealed many noteworthy structures, such as a fully intact Roman theatre.

Today, Pompeii belongs to the much larger Vesuvius National Park and is one of Italy’s most popular tourist sites, attracting approximately 2.5 million visitors annually.

=== Hindenburg incident (1937) ===
In the early evening of May 6, 1937, the German passenger airship Hindenburg burst into flames during a docking attempt at the Lakehurst Naval Air Station, just outside Lakehurst, New Jersey. With the cause of the fire unknown and a death toll of thirty-seven passengers, the Hindenburg disaster became one of the biggest news stories of its time.

Today, a bronze plaque and cement outline the site of the incident. Immediately east of the crash site, volunteers of the Navy Lakehurst Historical Society will conduct public tours of Historic Hangar One, the location where the Hindenburg was kept.

=== 1986 Chernobyl nuclear plant explosion ===
On the morning of April 26, 1986, the number four reactor of the Chernobyl nuclear power plant exploded, producing airborne radioactive materials and a fire that burned for ten days into the surrounding environment and atmosphere. The Chernobyl explosion caused 31-60 direct known deaths with several thousands to potentially tens of thousands in deaths due to long-term radiation exposure. In the aftermath, around 400,000 people were displaced from Chernobyl and the nearby city of Pripyat and all other affected territories in Belarus, Ukraine, and Russia. The other three reactors at Chernobyl power plant continued running at the time but were gradually lessened until the power plant’s shutdown in 2000.

Prior to the 2022 Russian invasion of Ukraine, companies including SoloEast travel ran daylong tours through Chernobyl’s exclusion zone, a 2600 square-kilometer area that includes the plant. The highlights of the tour include visiting the Red Forest, a pine tree woodland destroyed by radioactive contamination, exploring Kopachi, a nearby village that was demolished due to high contamination levels, and finally coming within 305 meters of the remains of the number four reactor. These tours are met with some controversy because although SoloEast Travel claims that publicly accessible areas surrounding the power plant contain low levels of radiation and are deemed safe, a number of third-party scientists disagree.

=== 1989 Exxon Valdez oil spill ===
In 1989, the Exxon Valdez oil tanker struck Alaska's Bligh Reef in Prince William Sound and leaked crude oil into the sound. An estimated 10.8 to 31.7 million US gal (40,900 to 120,000 m^{3}) spilled. Oil from the spill would eventually contaminate more than 11,000 square miles (28,000 km^{2}) of ocean and 1,300 miles (2,100 km) of coastline. The spill killed hundreds of sea otters, harbor seals, and eagles and hundreds of thousands of seabirds in the days following the spill. Despite that it is not the world's largest oil spill, the Exxon Valdez oil spill is typically considered the most notorious in American history.

Having been among the first responders, the family-run Stan Stephens Cruises operates glacier tours out of Prince William Sound that highlight the history surrounding the Exxon Valdez spill and its aftermath.

=== Hurricane Katrina (2005) ===
In late August 2005, Hurricane Katrina devastated the American city of New Orleans. Although 80–90% of the population was evacuated prior, twenty-three breaches in navigational canal levees, drainage canal levees, and floodwalls occurred as a result of Katrina’s storm surge. With these failures, 80% of New Orleans became flooded, which in turn caused over 200,000 homes to be destroyed and 800,000 residents to be displaced. At the time, the disaster had a large impact on the politics, population, and economics for a sizable portion of the United States.

A decade after the incident, the effects of Hurricane Katrina were still visible and catastrophic. Although many companies offered bus tours of the still-damaged regions, critics argued that these tours interfered with the relief effort. Some had suggested that curious tourists should instead go on bike tours in order to restrict the disruption to residents trying to get their lives back on track. Quite frequently, tours would focus on showcasing the culture of specific districts and neighborhoods, treating Hurricane Katrina as the most recent event in a much longer cultural history. On the plus side, some tours donated their profits or a portion of their profits to local relief organizations.

=== 2010 eruption of Eyjafjallajökull ===
Eyjafjallajökull, in Iceland, began erupting on 20 March 2010. At this time, about 500 farmers and their families from the areas of Fljótshlíð, Eyjafjöll, and Landeyjar were evacuated overnight, but allowed to return to their farms and homes after Civil Protection Department risk assessment. On 14 April 2010, Eyjafjallajökull erupted for the second time, requiring 800 people to be evacuated.

In the wake of the first eruption, tour companies offered trips to see the volcano. However, the ash cloud from the second eruption disrupted air traffic over Great Britain and most of northern and western Europe, making it difficult to travel to Iceland even though Iceland's airspace itself remained open throughout.

=== 2010 eruption of Mount Merapi ===
In the November of 2010, the active Indonesian volcano of Mount Merapi had its second eruption in a century, which led to direct deaths of 353 people and the displacement of approximately 400,000 people in nearby villages.

Mount Merapi is unique among disaster tourist sites because Merapi was a popular tourist site prior to the volcano’s eruption, and tourism had already made up a significant portion of the local economy. While many tour companies and travel agencies hold more standard sightseeing tours with jeeps of the affected areas, some programs provide more direct paths to donating to local charities and getting involved in the relief effort. For example, the Go Green Campaign encourages tourists to purchase small trees or seeds and plant them in local villages.

== See also ==
- Dark tourism
- Katia and Maurice Krafft, volcanologists who actively sought out erupting volcanoes
- War tourism
