= Zahlybia =

Zahlybia Заглиб'я
- Former village
- Interactive map of Zahlybia
- Location within Ukraine Location within Kyiv Oblast
- Coordinates: 51°15′48.5″N 30°27′41.1″E
- Country: Ukraine
- Oblast: Kyiv Oblast
- Raion: Chernobyl Raion (1923–1988); Ivankiv Raion (1988–2020); Vyshhorod Raion (2020–present); Chernobyl Exclusion Zone (de facto) (1990s–present)
- Established: before 1900
- Deregistered: 1999

Population (2025)
  - Total: 0
- Time zone: UTC+2 (EET)
  - Summer (DST): UTC+3 (EEST)

Zahlybia (Ukrainian: Заглиб'я) is an abandoned settlement and former village (selo) in Vyshhorod Raion, Kyiv Oblast, northern Ukraine. The village was evacuated following the aftermath of the 1986 Chernobyl disaster. Before the Chernobyl disaster, the village was under the jurisdiction of the Ladyzhychi village council. It was located near the border with Belarus.

== History ==
In 1900, Zahlybia was a German hamlet with 8 houses and 27 residents (16 men and 11 women). The main occupation of the residents was agriculture. The hamlet had 150 desiatinas (approximately 163 hectares) of land, which belonged to Maria Fedorivna Gezen'eger and was leased by the colonists. The farming system was based on a three-field rotation.

On a 1941 map, the settlement of Zahlybia had 41 houses. On April 25, 1943, during World War II, a Nazi squad burned the settlement and killed 4 residents. After the war, the village was rebuilt.

After the Chernobyl disaster in 1986, the residents of the village were evacuated. Zahlybia became a part of the Chernobyl Exclusion Zone, and in 1999, it was officially deregistered.

Until 18 July 2020, Zahlybia belonged to Ivankiv Raion. The raion was abolished that day as part of the administrative reform of Ukraine, which reduced the number of raions of Kyiv Oblast to seven. The area of Ivankiv Raion was merged into Vyshhorod Raion.

From February to April 2022, Zahlybia was occupied by Russian forces as a result of the Russian invasion of Ukraine.
