= Dytiatky =

Rural locality in Kyiv Oblast, Ukraine

Dytiatky Дитятки
- Village
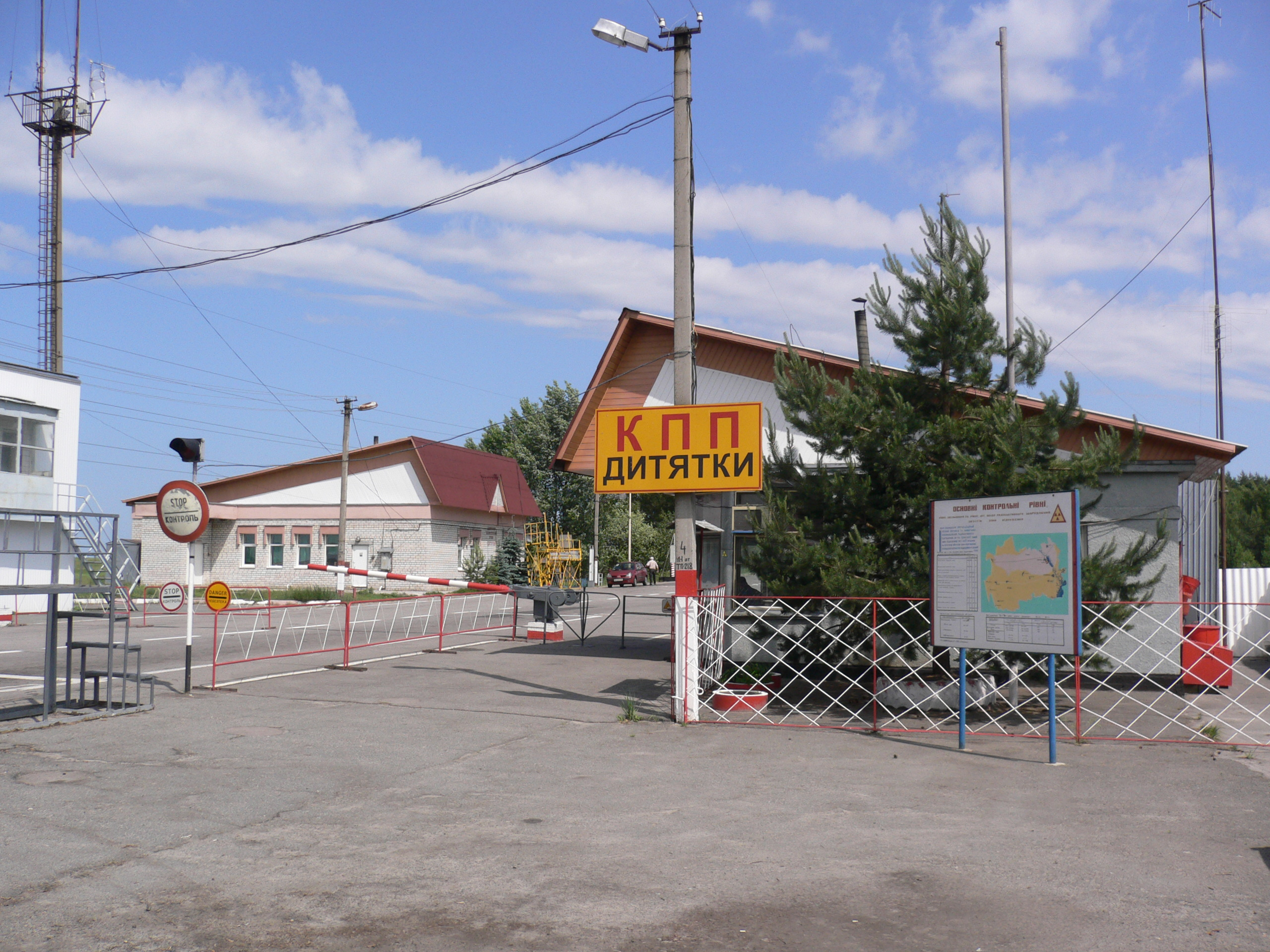
- Dytiatky Checkpoint

- Location of Hornostapil in Ukraine Dytiatky (Ukraine)
- Coordinates: 51°6′45″N 30°8′43″E
- Country: Ukraine
- Oblast: Kyiv Oblast
- Raion: Vyshhorod Raion
- Hromada: Ivankiv settlement hromada
- Founded: 1864

Area
  - Total: 2.1 km^{2} (0.81 sq mi)
- Elevation: 126 m (413 ft)

Population (2001)
  - Total: 571
- Postal code: 07220
- Area code: +380 4591

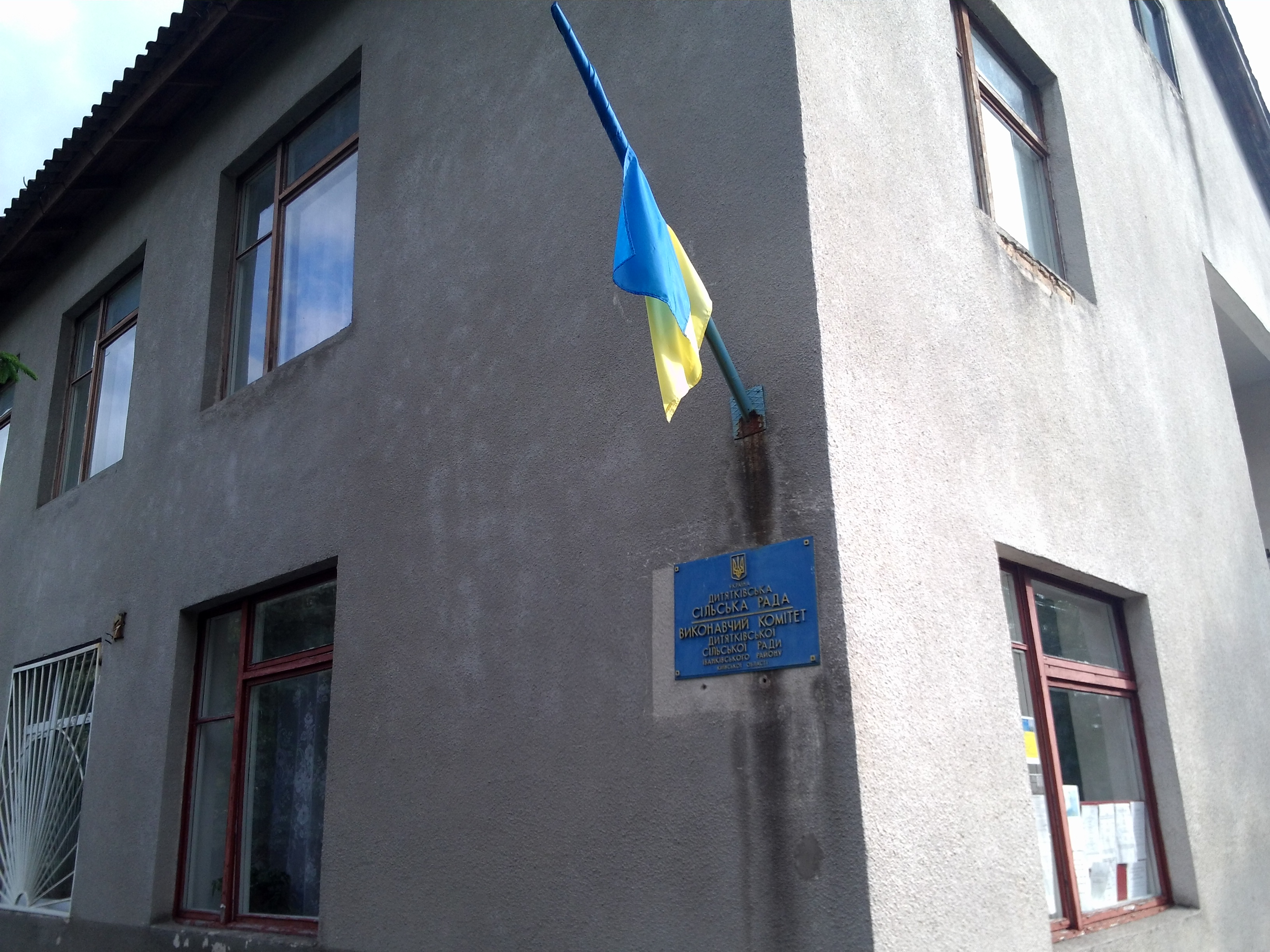
Dytiatky Town Hall

Dytiatky (Ukrainian: Дитятки, also spelled Dytyatky) is a Ukrainian village in Vyshhorod Raion, Kyiv Oblast. It belongs to Ivankiv settlement hromada, one of the hromadas of Ukraine. As of 2001, Dytiatky had a population of 571.

== History ==
The village was first mentioned in 1864. On 25 August 1941, it was occupied by Nazi German troops, and the population that left the occupied area subsequently resisted the German army. 154 villagers received Soviet orders and medals.

The village was part of the former Chernobyl Raion until 1988, when it was disestablished after the 1986 nuclear accident, and was one of the few villages in the raion that remained outside the Chernobyl Exclusion Zone.

Until 18 July 2020, Dytiatky belonged to Ivankiv Raion. The raion was abolished that day as part of the administrative reform of Ukraine, which reduced the number of raions of Kyiv Oblast to seven. The area of Ivankiv Raion was merged into Vyshhorod Raion.

From February to April 2022, Dytiatky was occupied by Russia as a result of the 2022 invasion.

== Geography ==
Dytiatky is located between Ivankiv (32 km [20 mi]) and Chernobyl (23 km [14 mi]), on a branch of the P02 road. It is the seat of one of the busiest checkpoints (Ukrainian: КПП Дитятки - KPP Dytyatky) to the Chernobyl Exclusion Zone, being on the main tourist route to the area and the Chernobyl Nuclear Power Plant (40 km [25 mi]).

The village is 10 km (6.2 mi) from Hornostaipil, 41 km (25 mi) from Pripyat and 115 km (71 mi) from Kyiv. It is the seat of the homonym rural council, that includes the villages of Fruzynivka and Zoryn, has an area of 38 km^{2} (15 sq mi) and a population of 1,011.

== Gallery ==
5
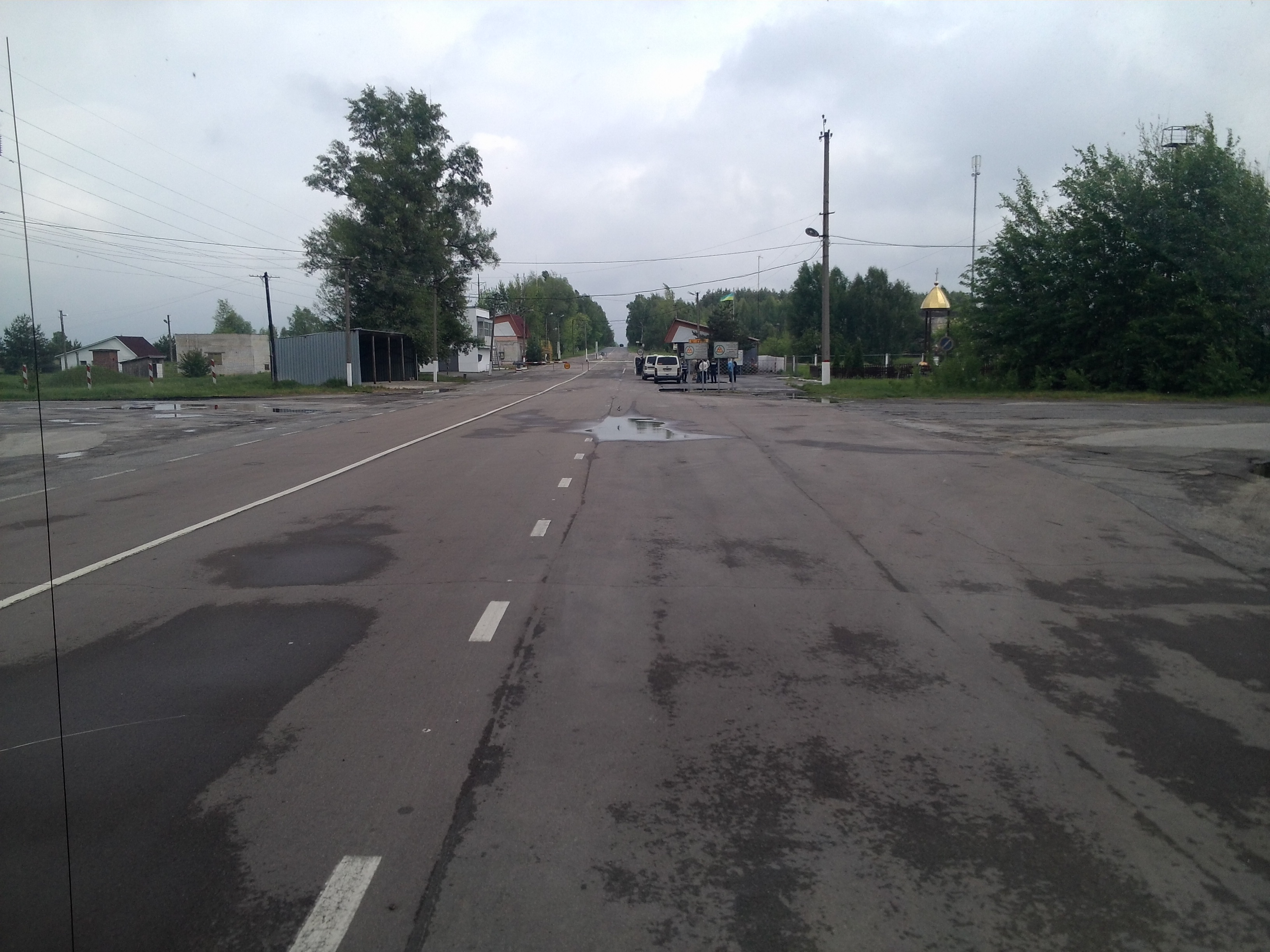
Dytiatky's main road with
the checkpoint in background

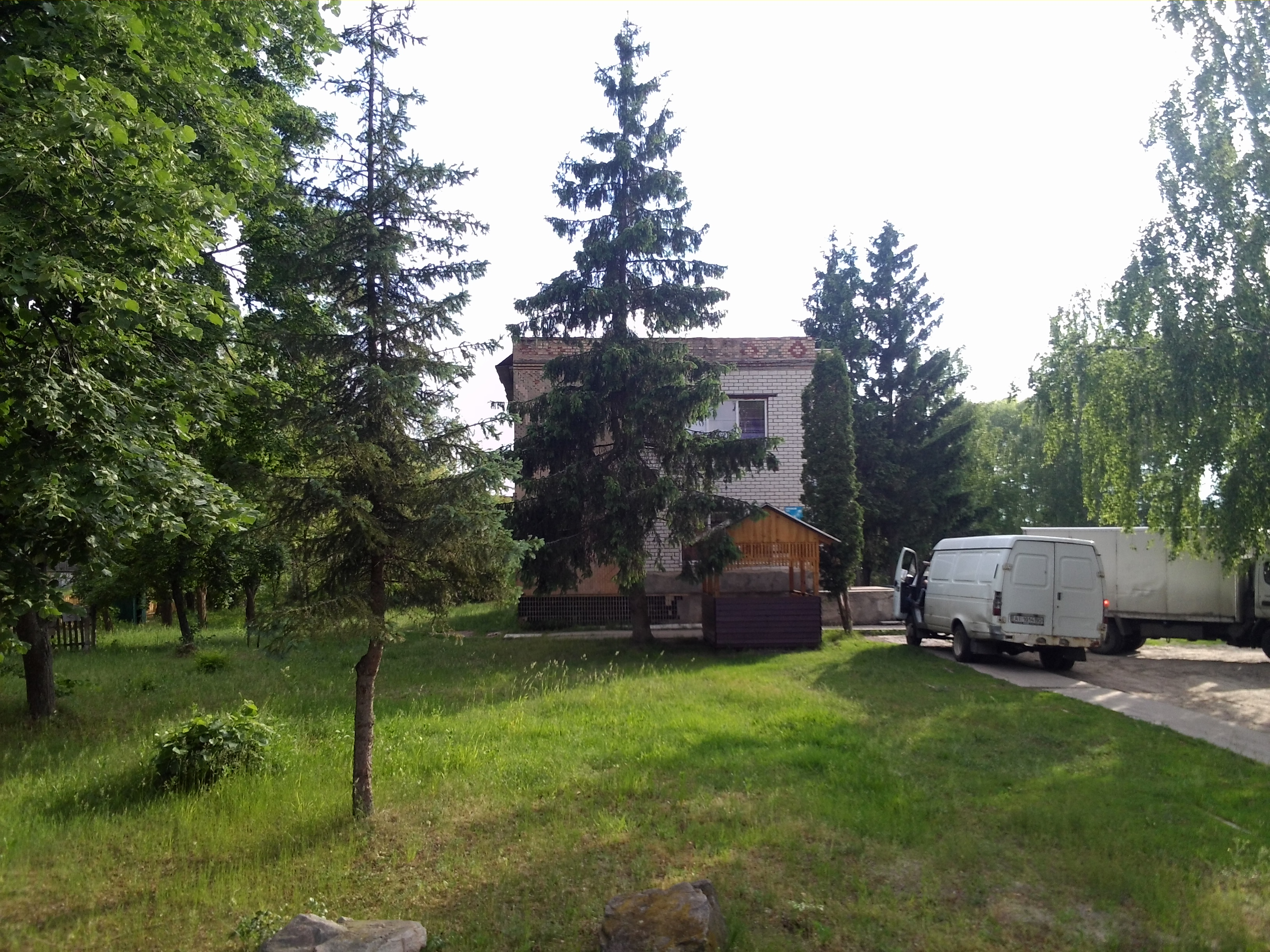
A rural house

== See also ==
- Chernobyl disaster
