= Kosharivka, Chernobyl Raion =

Kosharivka
- Former village
- Кошарівка
- Location within Ukraine Location within Kyiv Oblast
- Coordinates: 51°26′3.26″N 30°0′19.27″E
- Country: Ukraine
- Oblast: Kyiv Oblast
- Raion: Chernobyl Raion (1923–1988); Ivankiv Raion (1988–2020); Vyshhorod Raion (2020–present); Chernobyl Exclusion Zone (de facto) (1986–present)
- Established: before 1887
- Deregistered: 1999

Population (2026)
  - Total: 0
- Time zone: UTC+2 (EET)
  - Summer (DST): UTC+3 (EEST)

Kosharivka (Ukrainian: Кошарівка), also known as Kosharovka (Russian: Кошаровка), is an abandoned settlement and former village (selo) in Vyshhorod Raion, Kyiv Oblast, northern Ukraine. The village was evacuated following the aftermath of the 1986 Chernobyl disaster. It was situated on the right bank of the Pripyat River.

== History ==
The date of the village's establishment is unknown.

In 1887 the village had a population of 170. In 1900, 185 inhabitants lived in 33 households, engaged in agriculture. The village was administratively subordinated to the Shepelychi volost of Radomysl uezd.

At the turn of the 1970s and 1980s the village had a population of some 250. Immediately before the Chernobyl disaster, the population was 152, and there were 93 households in the village. A canning factory operated there. Kosharivka was administratively subordinated to the Novoshepelychi Village Council.

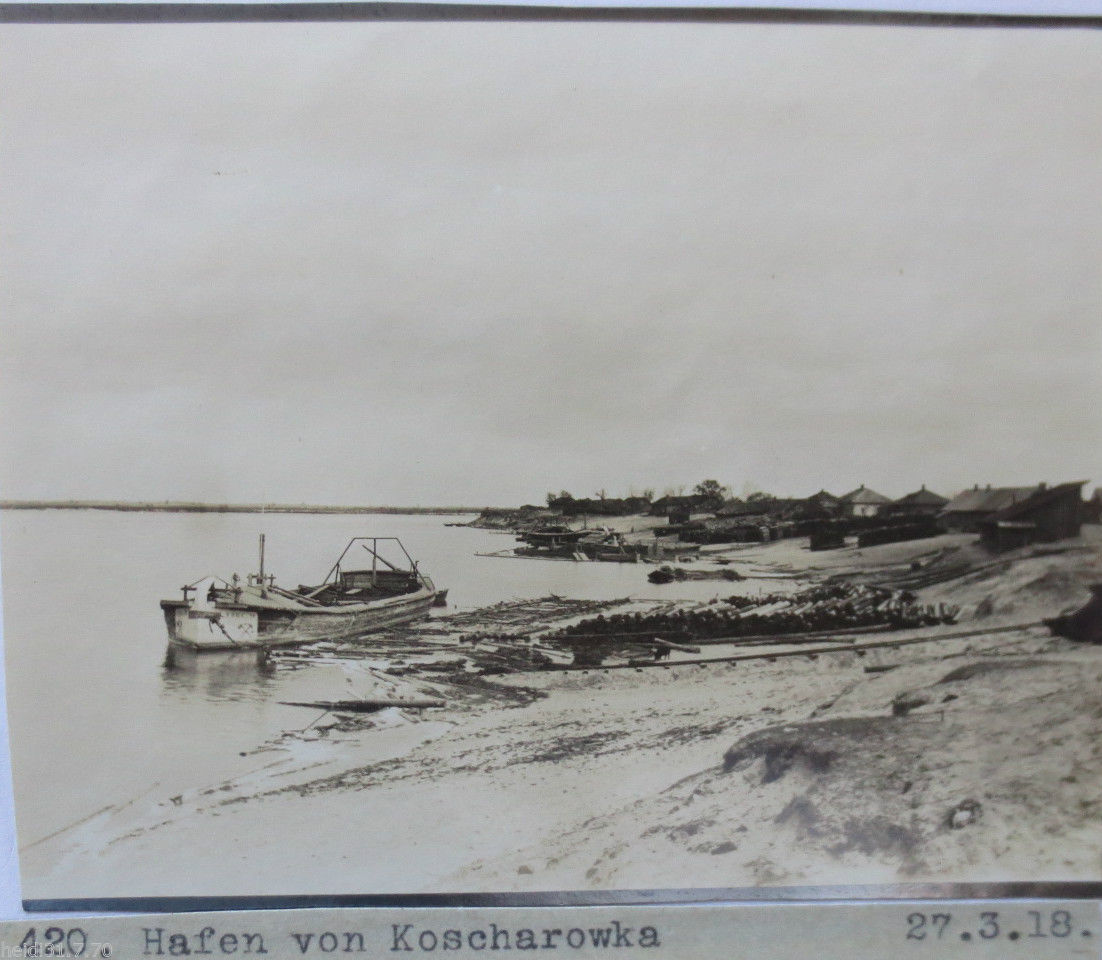
Pripyat river port in Kosharivka as seen in 1918

Following the Chernobyl disaster on 26 April 1986, the village was completely resettled on 2–3 May 1986 due to severe radioactive contamination caused by the disaster. Its residents were relocated to the village of Borivka in Makariv Raion (today Bucha Raion). The village was officially removed from the register on 19 August 1999 due to the absence of a permanent population. Most of the village was almost completely destroyed during decontamination operations. The village became part of the 10-kilometre exclusion zone.

After the abolition of Chernobyl Raion in 1988, the village was incorporated into Ivankiv Raion of Kyiv Oblast, within the Chernobyl Exclusion Zone.

Following the 2020 administrative-territorial reform, the territory of the former village became part of the Ivankiv Settlement Territorial Community in Vyshhorod Raion, Kyiv Oblast, within the Chernobyl Exclusion Zone.

From February until April 2022, the village was occupied by Russian forces during the Russian invasion of Ukraine.

== Bibliography ==
- List of inhabited places of Kyiv Governorate, Kyiv, 1900 (in Russian);
- Lavrentiy Pokhilevich, Local History Works, edited by O. Pshonkivskyi, Bila Tserkva, 2007;
- "Where the Residents of the Chernobyl Raion Evacuated to" – archived 26 June 2012 by WebCite;
- "Information on the Evacuated Population" – archived 26 June 2012 by WebCite.
