= Opachychi =

Opachychi Опачичі
- Village
- Location of Opachychi in Ukraine Opachychi (Kyiv Oblast)
- Coordinates: 51°12′25.3″N 30°18′38.1″E
- Country: Ukraine
- Oblast: Kyiv Oblast
- Raion: Chernobyl Raion (1923–1988); Ivankiv Raion (1988–2020); Vyshhorod Raion (2020–present); Chernobyl Exclusion Zone (de facto) (1986–present)

Population (2019)
  - Total: 15
- Area code: +380 4493

Opachychi (Ukrainian: Опачичі) was a village in Vyshhorod Raion, Kyiv Oblast, Ukraine. It is located south-east of Chernobyl. It belongs to Ivankiv settlement hromada, one of the hromadas of Ukraine.

== History ==
The village is infamous for being an outlying area within the Chernobyl Exclusion Zone. The permanent population was evacuated following the 1986 accident, and officially the village was liquidated (i.e. excluded from the list of settlements of Kyiv Oblast) in 1999. However, despite radioactive contamination a few residents (samosely) have returned to live there, and as of 28 March 2006 the population was 19.

Until 18 July 2020, Opachychi belonged to Ivankiv Raion. The raion was abolished that day as part of the administrative reform of Ukraine, which reduced the number of raions of Kyiv Oblast to seven. The area of Ivankiv Raion was merged into Vyshhorod Raion.

From February to April 2022, Opachychi was occupied by Russian forces as a result of the Russian invasion of Ukraine.
