= Andriivka, Vyshhorod Raion, Kyiv Oblast =

Andriivka Андріївка
- Former village
- Location within Ukraine Location within Kyiv Oblast
- Coordinates: 51.130389°N 30.089611°E
- Country: Ukraine
- Oblast: Kyiv Oblast
- Raion: Chernobyl Raion (1923–1988); Ivankiv Raion (1988–2020); Vyshhorod Raion (2020–present); Chernobyl exclusion zone (de facto) (1986–present)
- Exclusion zone: Zone of Absolute (Mandatory) Resettlement

Population (2015)
  - Total: 0
- Time zone: UTC+2 (EET)
  - Summer (DST): UTC+3 (EEST)

Andriivka (Ukrainian: Андріївка) is a former village (a selo) in Vyshhorod Raion, Kyiv Oblast, northern Ukraine. The village was evacuated in 1990 following the aftermath of the 1986 Chernobyl disaster.

The village is located on the right bank of the river Veresnya, 22 kilometres (14 mi) from the former district centre, on the border of the Chernobyl exclusion zone. The border of the exclusion zone passes through the southern edge of the village.

== History ==
Andriivka was shown on a topographic map for the first time in 1931. Under the Soviet Union, the village was subordinated to the Terehiv village council.

In 1986, its total population was 224. Following the evacuation, these people were resettled in Yakhna, Fastov district. In 1999, the village was officially removed from the district survey.

Until 18 July 2020, Andriivka belonged to Ivankiv Raion. The raion was abolished that day as part of the administrative reform of Ukraine, which reduced the number of raions of Kyiv Oblast to seven. The area of Ivankiv Raion was merged into Vyshhorod Raion.

From February to April 2022, Andriivka was occupied by Russian forces as a result of the Russian invasion of Ukraine.
