= Antonina Dvoryanets =

Ukrainian hydraulic engineer and activist (1952–2014)

Hero of Ukraine Antonina Dvoryanets
- Антоніна Дворянець
- Born: 23 March 1952; Starosillya, Ukrainian SSR, Soviet Union
- Died: 18 February 2014 (aged 61); Kyiv, Ukraine
- Occupations: Hydraulic engineer Political activist
- Years active: 1972–2014
- Spouse: Ivan Grigoryovych Dvoryanets (m. 1973–2014)
- Children: 2
- Awards: Hero of Ukraine

Antonina Grigorivna Dvoryanets (Ukrainian: Антоніна Григорівна Дворянець; née Nechiporenko; 23 March 1952 – 18 February 2014) was a Ukrainian hydraulic engineer and political activist. She began her career as an hydraulic engineer at a collective farm in Hornostaipil from 1972 to 1983 and then worked as a senior project group engineer at the Chernobyl Department of Drainage Systems between 1983 and 1987. Dvoryanets worked as a liquidator, clearing the consequences of the Chernobyl disaster at the Chernobyl Nuclear Power Plant in 1986. She later worked variously at the Land Reclamation and Water Management, Kyiv, then at the Chornobilvodeksploatsiya in Kyiv and the Chernobyl Special Plant until her retirement in 2014.

As an activist, Dvoryanets took part in the Ukraine without Kuchma mass protest, the Orange Revolution and the Euromaidan. She was posthumously conferred the title of Hero of Ukraine with the Order of the Gold Star and a street in Brovary was named for her.

== Early life and career ==
On 23 March 1952, Dvorianets was born in the village of Starosillya, Chernobyl Raion, Kyiv Oblast in the Ukrainian SSR. She was the daughter of Paraska Onikievna Nechiporenko and had one sister. Dvoryanets was educated firstly at Chornobyl boarding school since the village she was raised in had just a primary school. Dvoryanets went on to study hydraulic engineering at the secondary-level Boyar Reclamation Technical School from 1967. She graduated from the Ukrainian Republican Correspondence Agricultural Technical School (now the Boyar College of Ecology and Natural Resources) with a degree in Hydromelioration in 1972. Her graduation enabled her to select her workplace at a local collective farm.

Dvoryanets worked as an hydraulic engineer at a collective farm named after Vladimir Lenin in the village of Hornostaipil from 16 October 1972 to 16 June 1983. She went on to work as a senior project group engineer at the Chernobyl Department of Drainage Systems between 17 June 1983 and 4 May 1987. In 1985, Dvoryanets and her family relocated to the city of Chernobyl. She was a liquidator who helped to clear the consequences of the Chernobyl disaster at the Chernobyl Nuclear Power Plant in 1986 after she was evacuated from the Chernobyl Exclusion Zone to Shibene in Borodianka Raion on 5 May of that year. Dvoryanets worked as an engineer at the mechanisation department and was also an engineer-dispatcher of the Kyiv Department of Land Reclamation and Water Management, Kyiv water protection works department from 5 May 1987 to 31 March 1988. On 2 February 1988, she and her family moved to Brovary. Dvoryanets acquired employment as a senior inspector in the personnel department of the Brovary Department of Irrigation Systems from 1 April 1988 to 30 July 1994. Between 1 August 1994 and 1 May 2011, she worked as a lead hydrotechnical engineer at Chornobilvodeksploatsiya in Kyiv, ensuring that radionuclides did not enter the water streams of the basins of the Pripyat and Uzh rivers. Dvoryanets was a leading hydrotechnical engineer at the Chernobyl Special Plant from 1 May 2012 to 4 May 2012. She retired in 2012.

From the start of the 2000s, Dvoryanets took part in various activist causes in public. She partook in the Ukraine without Kuchma mass protest that lasted from 2000 to 2001. Dvorianets was also an active participant in the Orange Revolution in 2004. From late 2013 to early 2014, she actively participated in the Euromaidan protests at Maidan Nezalezhnosti in Kyiv, becoming acquainted with several women in the House of Trade Unions and provided food and drink to fellow activists. According to a colleague of hers, Dvoryanets took part in the protests to ensure the future of her family for generations.

== Personal life ==
She was married to the plant worker Ivan Grigoryovych Dvoryanets from 1 May 1973 until her death in 2014 and they had two children. Dvoryanets did embroidery in her leisure time.

== Death ==
On 18 February 2014, she peacefully picketed at the Verkhovna Rada before going on to join a barricade on Institutskiy Street near to the upper entrance of Khreshchatyk Metro Station where she was beaten to death by the Berkut Police Force after attempting to protect her fellow protesters. A coroner recorded her cause of death as a heart attack but her family disputed this; her family were required to sign Dvoryanets' death certificate before her ashes could be released to them. She was given a funeral service on the afternoon of 20 February, and she was buried at a cemetery in Brovary.

== Awards ==
She was posthumously made an honorary citizen of the City of Brovary during a session of the Brovary City Council in September 2014. In November 2014, president Petro Poroshenko posthumously conferred Dvoryanets the title of Hero of Ukraine with the Order of the Gold Star "For civic courage, patriotism, heroic defense of the constitutional foundations of democracy, human rights and freedoms, selfless service to the Ukrainian people, demonstrated during the Revolution of Dignity."

A memorial plaque dedicated to her was unveiled on the facade of her residence in Brovary in April 2015. Two months later, the Ukrainian Orthodox Church – Kyiv Patriarchate posthumously awarded Dvoryanets the Medal "For sacrifice and love of Ukraine". The Chubarya Brewery Street in Brovary was renamed after her by Brovary City Council on 25 December 2015. The Supreme Archbishop of Kyiv-Halytsk UGCC posthumously conferred her an honorary diploma in May 2016. Dvoryanets's name and portrait are engraved on the memorial of the Heroes of the Heavenly Hundred in Kyiv on Instytutska Street.
