= Kopachi =

Kopachi Копачі
- Former village
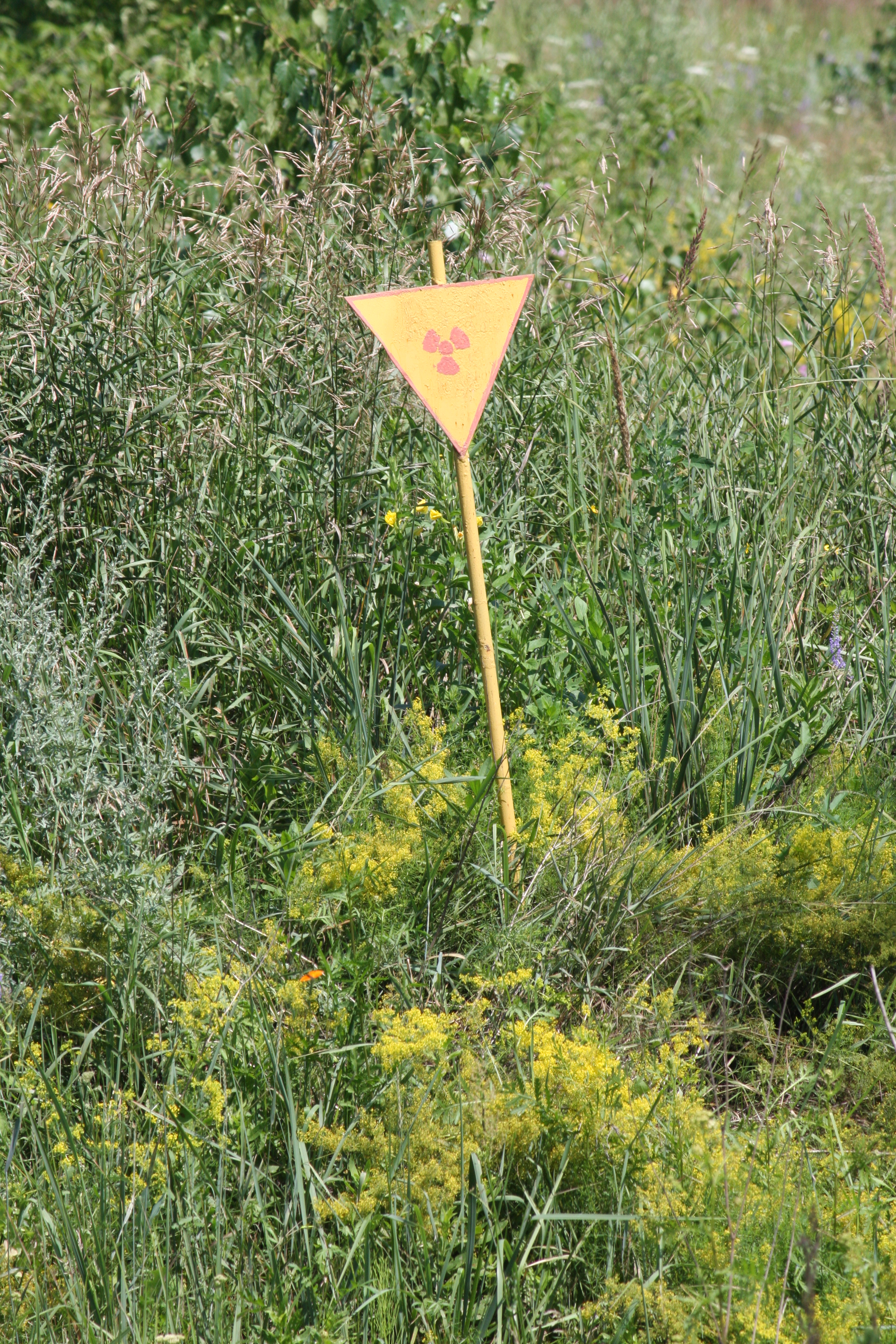
- The site of one of the buried houses of Kopachi

- Location of Kopachi in Ukraine Kopachi (Kyiv Oblast)
- Coordinates: 51°21′26.2″N 30°7′19.1″E
- Country: Ukraine
- Oblast: Kyiv Oblast
- Raion: Chernobyl Raion (1923–1988); Ivankiv Raion (1988–2020); Vyshhorod Raion (2020–present); Chernobyl Exclusion Zone (de facto) (1986–present)
- Elevation: 123 m (404 ft)

Population (1986)
  - Total: 0
- Area code: +380 4493

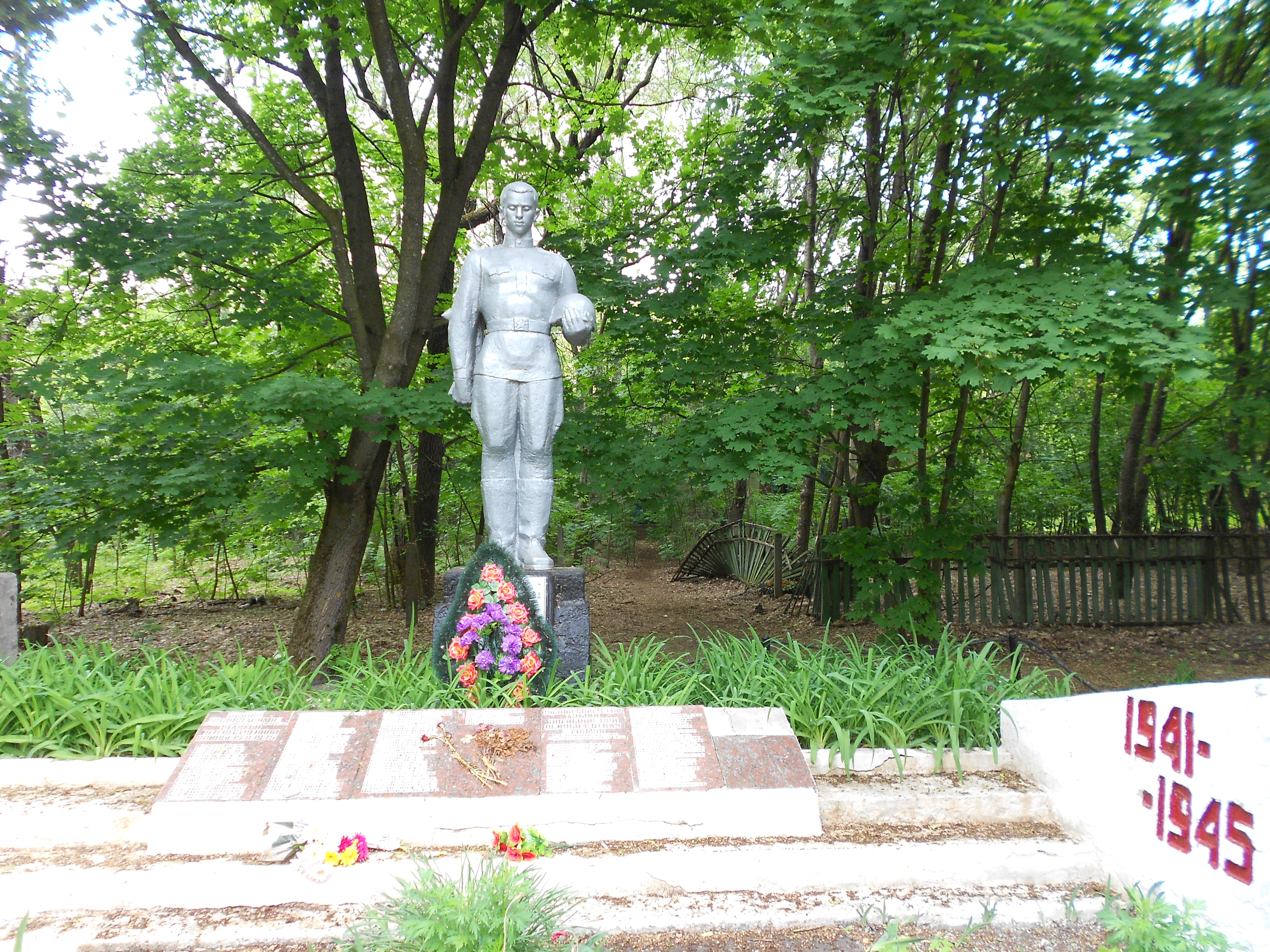
World War II Memorial

Kopachi (Ukrainian: Копачі; Russian: Копачи) is a former village near Chernobyl, Ukraine, just south-west of the Pripyat River Basin. After the Chernobyl disaster in 1986, the village was contaminated by fallout and subsequently evacuated and is now within the Chernobyl Exclusion Zone; thus it has been abandoned since 1986.

== History ==
After Kopachi village was evacuated by the authorities, all the houses were torn down and buried, as an experiment. This village was not the only village suffering this fate as a result of the Chernobyl disaster.

The only traces left of the village today is a series of mounds and a few surviving trees which are not part of the local native flora. Each mound contains the remains of one house and is topped by a sign with the international radiation symbol. The Chernobyl disaster highly contaminated Kopachi with high-level radioactive fallout. A kindergarten and one other brick building are the only architectural structures that remain standing; all other buildings were bulldozed. The government did not recognize the fact that these highly contaminated buildings and houses would seep radioactive isotopes into the water table. Burying the buildings drove radiotoxins deeper into the environment. The soil and water surrounding the former village remain contaminated with radioactive materials including plutonium, strontium-90, and caesium-137. Other villages in the exclusion zone faced a similar fate, thus polluting the aquifer.

Kopachi belonged to Chernobyl Raion from 1923. After the disaster, in 1988, the raion was dissolved and merged into the neighbouring Ivankiv Raion. The raion was abolished on 18 July 2020 as part of the administrative reform of Ukraine, which reduced the number of raions of Kyiv Oblast to seven. The area of Ivankiv Raion was merged into Vyshhorod Raion.

From February to April 2022, Kopachi was occupied by Russian forces as a result of the Russian invasion of Ukraine.

== Geography ==
The village, located a few kilometers south of the Chernobyl Plant and close to its cooling pond, lies on the road between Pripyat and Chernobyl. Other near settlements are the villages of Leliv and Yaniv.

== Gallery ==
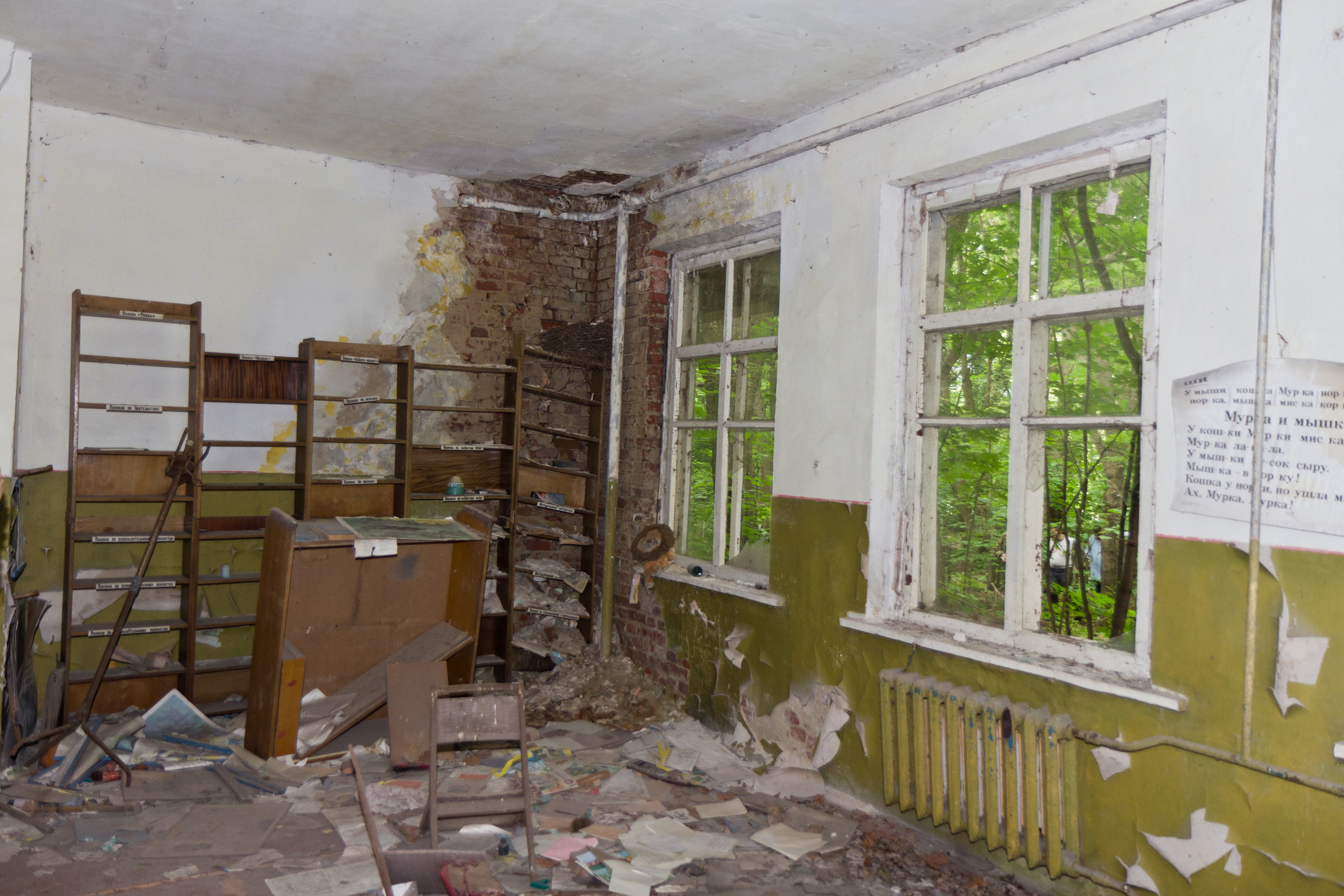
The abandoned kindergarten of Kopachi

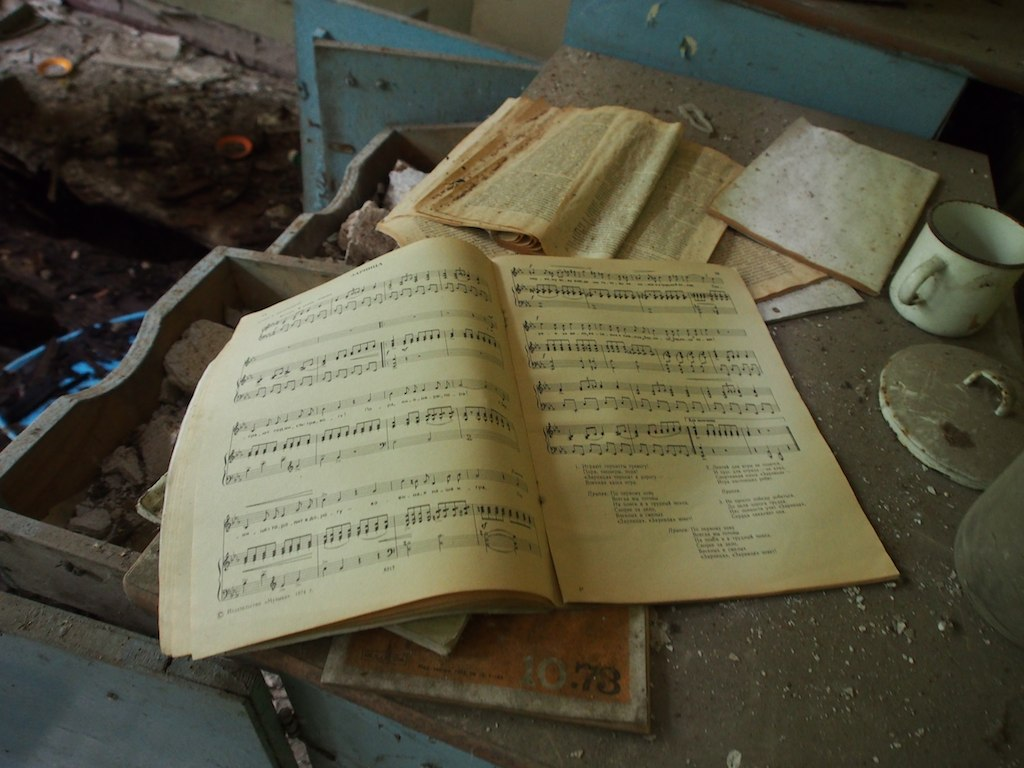
Books in the abandoned kindergarten

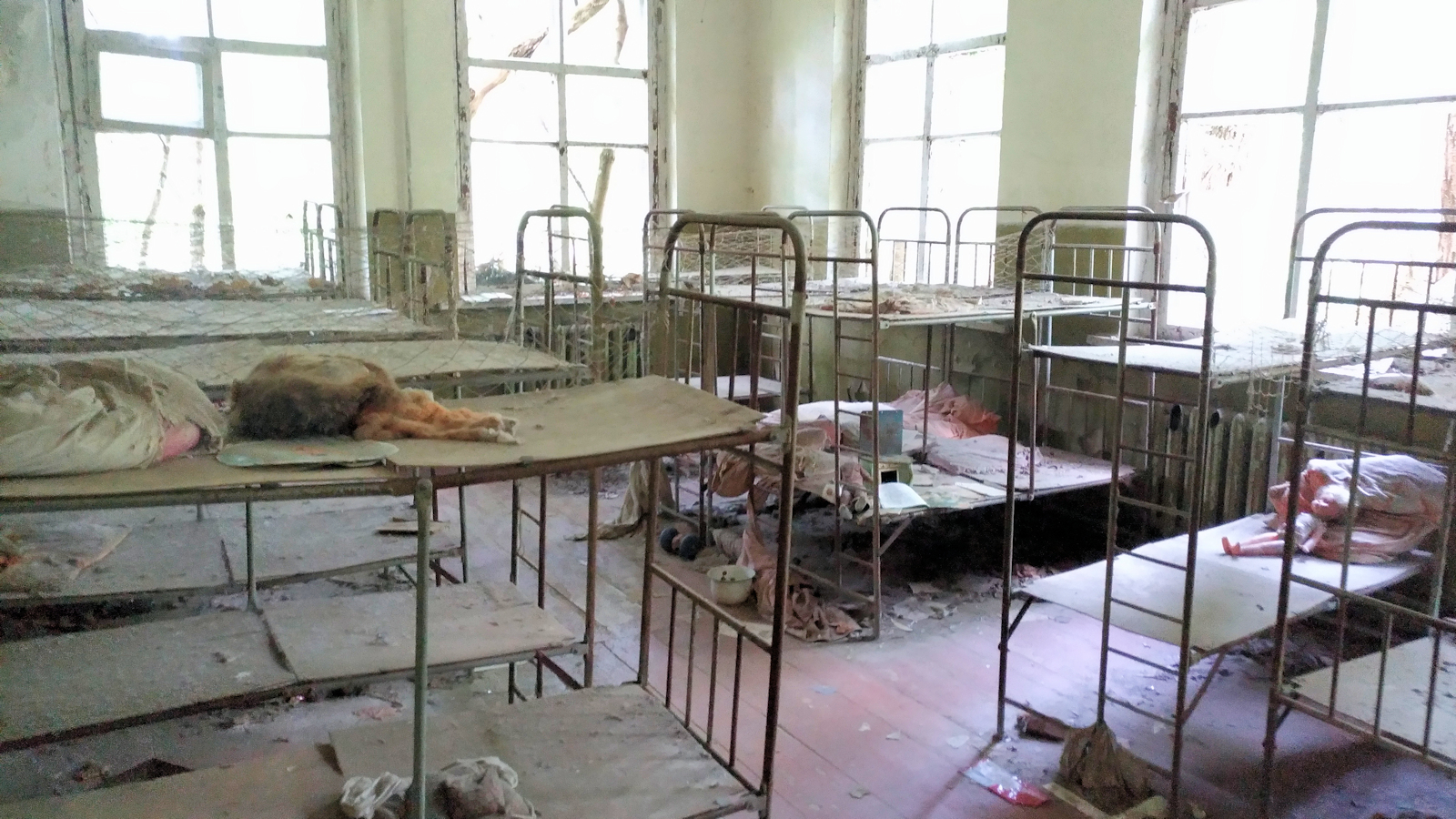
Beds in the abandoned kindergarten

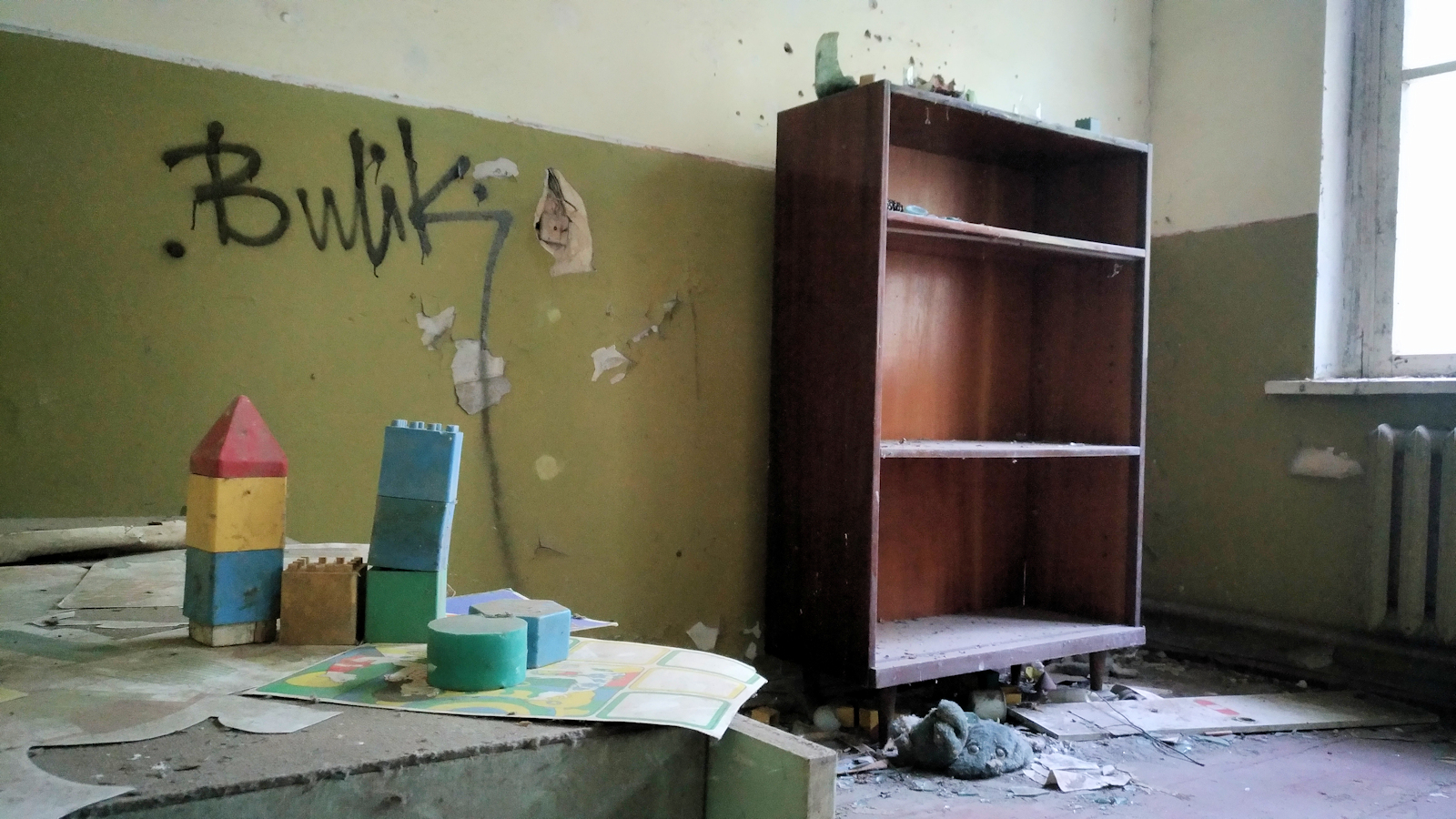
Toys in the abandoned kindergarten

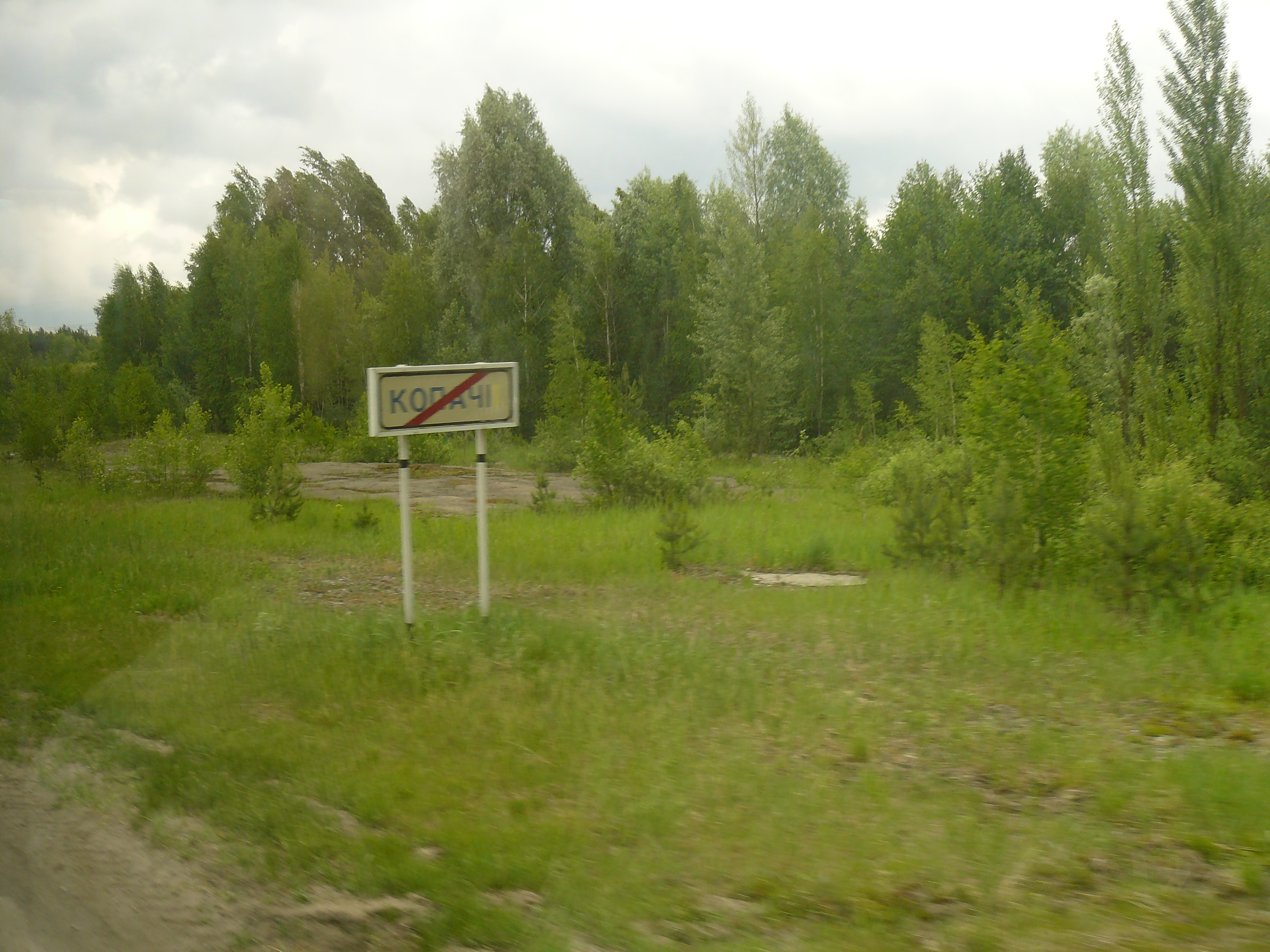
Town exit sign in Kopachi
