= Ivankiv =

Rural locality in Kyiv Oblast, Ukraine

Ivankiv Іванків
- Rural settlement
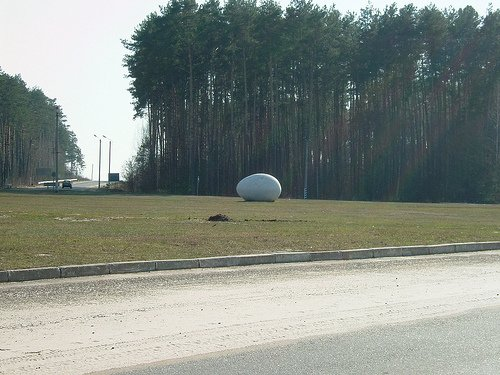
- "Big Egg" monument near Ivankiv's bus station

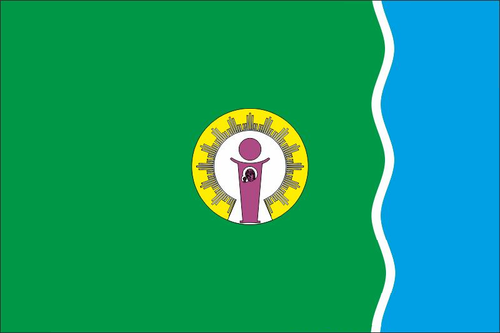
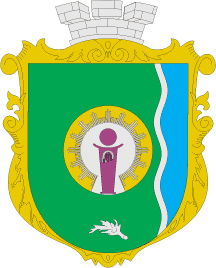
- Flag Coat of arms

- Location of Ivankiv Ivankiv (Ukraine)
- Coordinates: 50°55′58″N 29°54′17″E
- Country: Ukraine
- Oblast: Kyiv Oblast
- Raion: Vyshhorod Raion
- Hromada: Ivankiv settlement hromada
- Founded: 1589
- Control: Ukraine

Area
  - Total: 8 km^{2} (3.1 sq mi)

Population (2001)
  - Total: 10,563
- Postal code: 07200
- Area code: +380 4491
- Website: Official website

Ivankiv (Ukrainian: Іванків [iˈwɑnkiu̯]) is a rural settlement in Vyshhorod Raion, Kyiv Oblast (province) of Ukraine. It is situated on the left bank of the Teteriv River. Ivankiv hosts the administration of Ivankiv settlement hromada, one of the hromadas of Ukraine. Its population was 9,993 (2022 estimate). In 2001, the population had been 10,563.

== History ==
In the middle of the 15th century, the territory around modern Ivankiv was called "Zemlya Trudinivska" (Trudinivska Land). It was a property of Kyiv boyar Olehnja Juhnovich. In 1524 King of Poland Sigismund I the Old gave this land to Kyiv Burgess Tishko Proskura. In 1589 Ivan Proskura became the owner of this land. The town was founded in 1589 and named after Ivan Proskura. At first it was called "Ivaniv" and "Ivanivka" but later changed to "Ivankiv". At the beginning of the 17th century, Crimean Tatars made four military campaigns on Polesia, and as a result, many people in Ivankiv were killed, taken prisoner and sold into slavery.

On 30 May 1645, the forces of Grand Crown Hetman Stanisław Koniecpolski attacked Ivankiv, which at that time belonged to Olizar Wołczkiewicz.

Before the Soviet Revolution, Ivankiv had 400 houses, 60 market stalls, two leather factories, a mill, a hospital, four synagogues, and a savings and loan society. Around 2,000 Jewish residents lived in the town, making up half its population.

The revolution and the events that followed brought upheaval to Ivankiv. Between 1918 and 1921, armed gangs led by Struk and Loznyuk operated in the surrounding area. These groups, sometimes numbering as many as 1,000 people, raided the town, threatening Jewish residents and demanding large sums of money. During those years, repeated pogroms left Jews dead and homes looted and burned. By the end of this violence, only four Jewish families remained in the town.

During WWII Ivankiv was occupied by Nazi German forces in August 1941. At the end of September 1941, the Jewish residents of Ivankiv were loaded into trucks and driven to execution sites outside the town. German forces, assisted by local auxiliary police, executed between 302 and 366 Jewish people.

In the autumn 1941, 72 Jews were shot near the local hospital. In January 1942, the children from mixed families with at least one Jewish parent were shot.

The town was liberated in November, 1943.

In 1986, an explosion at the Chernobyl nuclear power plant devastated the surrounding region. Ivankiv, just 50 kilometers away, was deeply affected. Radioactive contamination spread across the entire municipality, leaving its residents to live with the consequences of the disaster.

Until 18 July 2020, Ivankiv served as an administrative center of Ivankiv Raion. The raion was abolished that day as part of the administrative reform of Ukraine, which reduced the number of raions of Kyiv Oblast to seven. The area of Ivankiv Raion was merged into Vyshhorod Raion.

The Ivankiv Historical and Local History Museum was reportedly destroyed during the 2022 Russian invasion of Ukraine, leading to the loss of over twenty works by the artist Maria Prymachenko. The settlement was used by the Russian military as a ground base for reinforcement in their push towards Kyiv. BBC quoted local residents saying that the occupying Russian forces did not allow evacuation and opened fire at anyone who tried to leave the settlement. On 1 April 2022, Ukrainian forces belonging to the 109th Battalion of the 10th Mountain Assault Brigade regained control of Ivankiv.

Until 26 January 2024, Ivankiv was designated urban-type settlement. On this day, a new law entered into force which abolished this status, and Ivankiv became a rural settlement.

== Geography ==
Located in the middle of Vyshhorod Raion, Ivankiv lies between Kyiv and Pripyat. It is located 42 miles (68 km) south from the Chernobyl power plant, with the entrance to the exclusion zone being located 20 miles (32 km) north, at Dytiatky. Ivankiv was not as affected by the Chernobyl disaster compared to other populated places.

== People from Ivankiv ==
- Petro Prymachenko, Ukrainian artist, soldier

== See also ==
- Chernobyl (city)
- Chernobyl Exclusion Zone
