= Bolotnia =

Rural locality in Kyiv Oblast, Ukraine

Bolotnia Болотня
- Location in Kyiv Oblast
- Coordinates: 50°57′49″N 29°52′39″E
- Country: Ukraine
- Oblast: Kyiv Oblast
- Raion: Ivankiv Raion
- Hromada: Ivankiv settlement hromada
- Time zone: UTC+2 (EET)
  - Summer (DST): UTC+3 (EEST)
- Postal code: 07201

Bolotnia (Ukrainian: Болотня) is a village in the Ivankiv settlement hromada of the Vyshhorod Raion of Kyiv Oblast in Ukraine.

== History ==
On 19 July 2020, as a result of the administrative-territorial reform and liquidation of the Ivankiv Raion, the village became part of the Vyshhorod Raion.

From late February to 1 April 2022, the village was occupied by Russian army.

== Notable residents ==
- Maria Prymachenko (1909 [O.S. 1908]–1997), Ukrainian folk art painter, who worked in the naïve art style
- Fedir Prymachenko (1941–2008), Ukrainian master of decorative painting, son of the artist Maria Prymachenko
