= Novoshepelychi =

Abandoned village in Ukraine

Novoshepelychi Новошепеличі
- Village
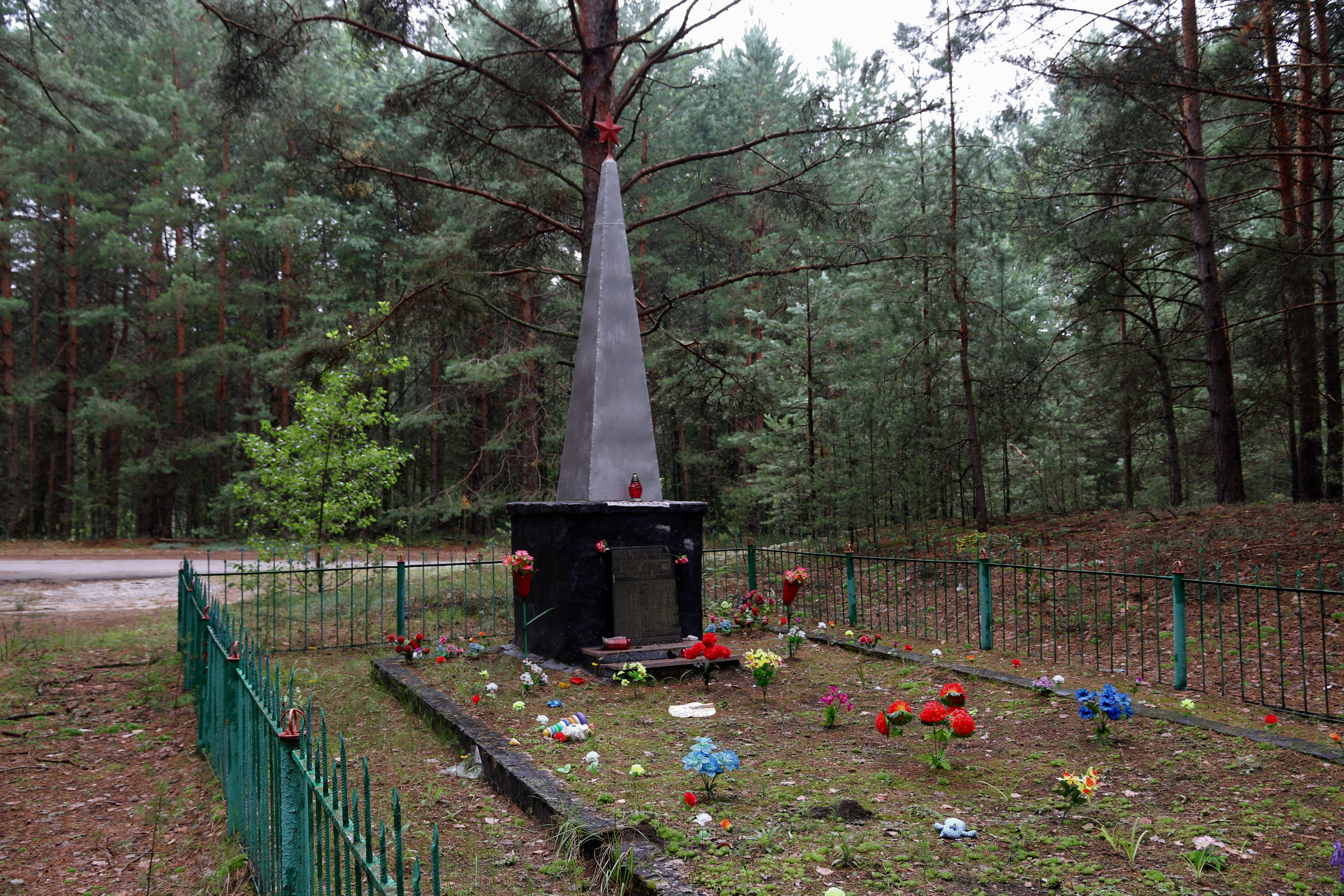
- World War II Memorial in Novoshepelychi

- Location of Kopachi in Ukraine Novoshepelychi (Kyiv Oblast)
- Coordinates: 51°21′47″N 30°0′48″E
- Country: Ukraine
- Oblast: Kyiv Oblast
- Raion: Novoshepelychi Raion (1923–1953); Chernobyl Raion (1953–1988); Ivankiv Raion (1988–2020); Vyshhorod Raion (2020–present); Chernobyl Exclusion Zone (de facto) (1986–present)
- Founded: 1507
- Elevation: 113 m (371 ft)

Population (1986)
  - Total: 0

Novoshepelychi (Ukrainian: Новошепеличі; Russian: Новошепеличи) was a village near Pripyat, Ukraine, south-west of the Pripyat River basin. After the Chernobyl disaster in 1986 the village was contaminated by fallout and subsequently evacuated, and now lies within the Chernobyl Exclusion Zone. The village has been abandoned since 2013.

== History ==
In the 11th century a settlement existed in the area, surrounded by a rampart and a moat. L. Pokhylevych suggested that this was the settlement of Shepel (or Shopol), mentioned in the chronicle of 1098.

Before the Chernobyl disaster, 1683 people lived in the village.

The village belonged to the Novoshepelychi Raion administrative division from 1923. Novoshepelychi Raion was dissolved in 1953 and the village joined the Chernobyl Raion. After the Chernobyl disaster in 1986, the raion was dissolved and merged into the neighbouring Ivankiv Raion. The raion was abolished on 18 July 2020 as part of the administrative reform of Ukraine, which reduced the number of raions of Kyiv Oblast to seven. The area of Ivankiv Raion was merged into Vyshhorod Raion.

== Geography ==
The village was located north of Pripyat, and lies on the road between Pripyat and Mazyr. Other near settlements are the villages of Stari Shepelychi, Kosharivka, and Benivka.

== Notable people ==
- Svitlana Sircova, Ukrainian historician
- Serhiy Tkachenko, Ukrainian philologist, literary critic, poet, member of the National Union of Ukrainian Writers.
