= Tashky =

Rural locality in Khmelnytskyi Oblast, Ukraine

Tashky Ташки
- Location in Khmelnytskyi Oblast Tashky (Ukraine)
- Coordinates: 50°15′04″N 26°53′49″E
- Country: Ukraine
- Oblast: Khmelnytskyi Oblast
- Raion: Shepetivka Raion
- Hromada: Ulashanivka rural hromada
- Time zone: UTC+2 (EET)
  - Summer (DST): UTC+3 (EEST)
- Postal code: 30014

Tashky (Ukrainian: Ташки) is a village in the Ulashanivka rural hromada of the Shepetivka Raion of Khmelnytskyi Oblast in Ukraine.

== History ==
From 1882, a paper mill has been operating in the village.

On 19 July 2020, as a result of the administrative-territorial reform and liquidation of the Slavuta Raion, the village became part of the Shepetivka Raion.

== Notable residents ==
- Mariia Halushko (1937–2024), Ukrainian master of artistic ceramics
