= Mariia Halushko =

Ukrainian master of artistic ceramics (1937–2024)

- Марія Семенівна Галушко
- Born: 5 October 1937; Tashky, now Khmelnytskyi Oblast, Ukraine
- Died: 5 November 2024 (aged 87)
- Occupation: Master of artistic ceramics

Mariia Halushko (Ukrainian: Марія Семенівна Галушко; 5 October 1937 – 21 November 2024) was a Ukrainian master of artistic ceramics. Member of the National Union of Artists of Ukraine (1983). Laureate of the Kateryna Bilokur Prize.

== Biography ==
Mariia Halushko was born on 5 October 1937 in the village of Tashky, now the Ulashanivska Hromada of Shepetivka Raion of Khmelnytskyi Oblast of Ukraine.

She received her elementary education in Khmelnytskyi Oblast.

She died on 21 November 2024.

== Creativity ==
From 1969 – participant of exhibitions. Her personal exhibitions are held in Kyiv. In November 2024, the exhibition "Dvi Marii" was opened in the National Reserve "Sophia of Kyiv", which was dedicated to the work of two artists of naïve art – Maria Prymachenko and Mariia Halushko.

Halushko's works feature images and symbols of folk art that captivate with their uniqueness and vivid originality in the interpretation of folk motifs. The artist uses the traditions of Ukrainian folk figurative tableware in her animalistic plastics. In 1984, Mariia Halushko's name was included in the World Encyclopedia of Artistic Naïve.

The works are kept in the collections of the National Museum of Folk Architecture and Folkways of Ukraine, Kaniv Museum of Folk Art, Chernihiv and Sumy Regional Art Museums, and Karaganda Museum of Fine Arts (Kazakhstan).

Main works: "Troisti muzyky" (1968), "Kazkovyi zvir", "Narechena i narechenyi", "Pan chort na vesilli", "Baran", "Rys", "Maty z khlibom" (all 1970), "Korovainytsi" (1971), "Otara" (1972), "Vedmid-lasun" (1980), "Vivtselev" (1982), "Zhinka z porosiam" (1985), "Zamriianyi olen" (1988), "Nichnyi zvir", "Vesillia z prydanym", "Khlopchyk iz dudkoiu" (all 1989), "De nasha trava?" (1990), "Vesnianky" (1991–94), "Muzyky" (1993), "Na zelenyi luh" (1995), "Kozlyk Danylko" (1996), "Olen" (2000); decorative sculptures – "Zvir u kvitakh" (1978), "Zakokhani" (1979); seriia "Sviato" (2000).
