= Petro Prymachenko =

Ukrainian artist, soldier

- Петро Примаченко

Personal details
- Born: Petro Fedorovych Prymachenko

Military service
- Allegiance: Ukraine
- Branch/service: Armed Forces of Ukraine
- Rank: Sergeant
- Battles/wars: Russo-Ukrainian War
- Awards: Order for Courage

Petro Fedorovych Prymachenko (Ukrainian: Петро Федорович Примаченко; born in Ivankiv, Kyiv Oblast) is a Ukrainian artist, soldier, sergeant of the Territorial Defense of the Armed Forces of Ukraine, a participant of the Russian-Ukrainian war.

== Biography ==
His grandmother is Ukrainian artist Mariia Prymachenko, who taught him to draw, read, and write as a child. He was most influenced by the work of his father, Fedir Prymachenko.

He participated in the Revolution of Dignity.

With the beginning of a large-scale Russian invasion at the front. Participated in the defense of Kyiv Oblast.

He is engaged in charity work.

In his works he combines abstraction and folk art.

== Awards ==
- Order for Courage, III class (20 March 2023)
- Medal “For Military Service to Ukraine” (March 20, 2024)
