= Yuriy Khymych =

Ukrainian architect and artist (1928–2003)

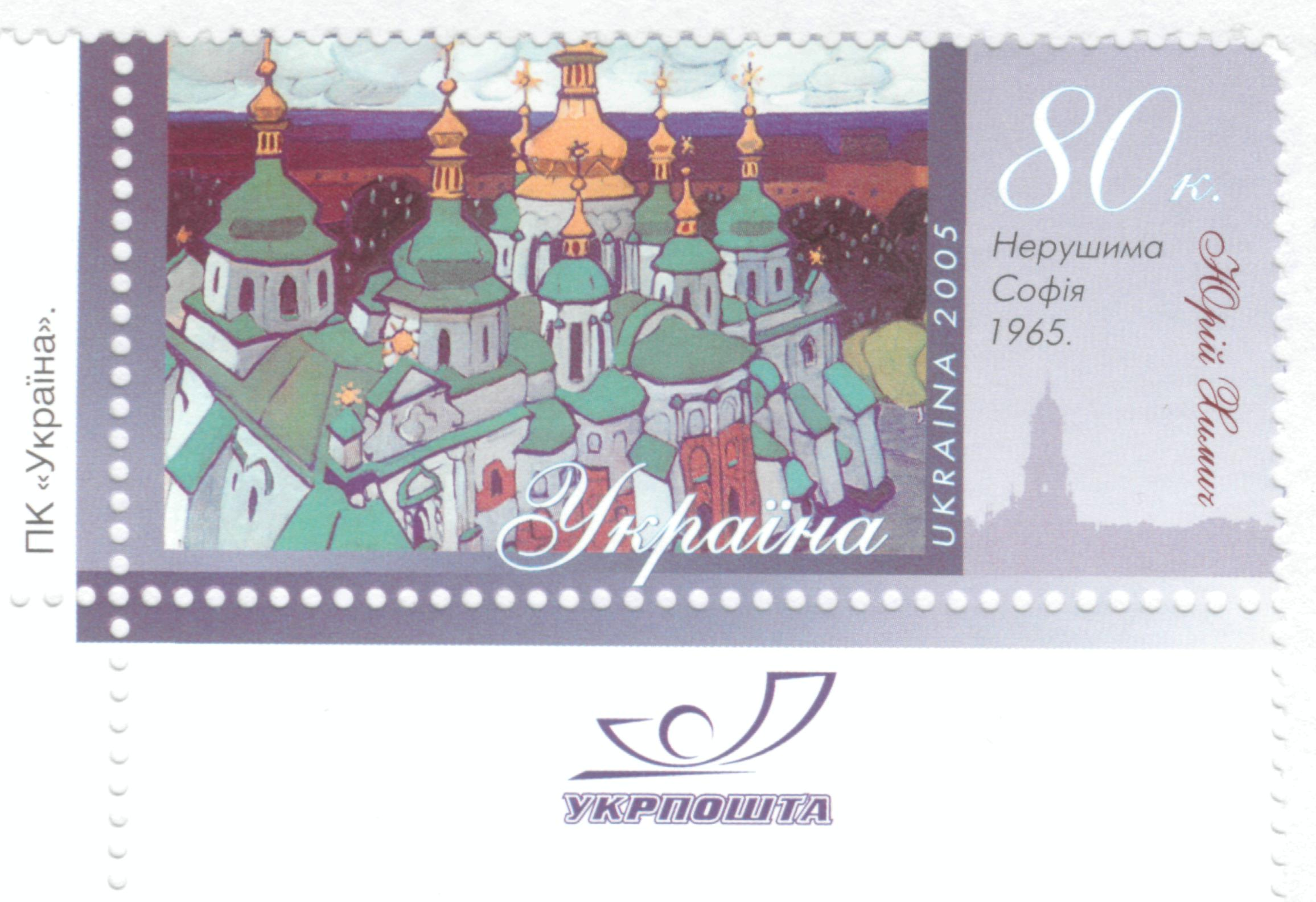
The Indestructible Sophia (of Kyiv). Painting by Yuri Khymych, 1965. Ukrainian stamp, 2005, 80 kop.

Yuri Ivanovych Khymych (Ukrainian: Химич Юрій Іванович: April 12, 1928 in Kamianets-Podilskyi – July 23, 2003 in Kyiv) was a Soviet, Ukrainian architect and artist (graphic artist), an outstanding master of the architectural landscape, a classic of the Ukrainian fine arts of the 20th century, a teacher. Honored Artist and Architect of Ukraine, member of the National Union of Architects of Ukraine (1955), member of the National Union of Artists of Ukraine (1962), Honored Artist of the Ukrainian SSR (1990), honorary member of the Academy of Architecture of Ukraine. In the late 50s of the twentieth century, among art historians, he gained fame as one of the best watercolorists of the USSR of that time.. He worked primarily in water colours and oil.

Trained as an architect, he painted traditional and historic buildings, such as churches and monasteries, also cityscapes and landscapes. His works of art are located in various museums today. He was honoured with a Ukrainian stamp in 2005 with his depiction of Saint Sophia Cathedral, Kyiv.

== See also ==
- Maria Prymachenko (1908–1997)
