= Hornostaipil =

Rural locality in Kyiv Oblast, Ukraine

Hornostaipil Горностайпіль
- Village
- Location of Hornostapil in Ukraine Hornostaipil (Ukraine)
- Coordinates: 51°4′15″N 30°15′8″E
- Country: Ukraine
- Oblast: Kyiv Oblast
- Raion: Chernobyl Raion (1923–1988); Ivankiv Raion (1988-2020); Vyshhorod Raion (since 2020)
- Founded: 1294

Population
  - Total: 1,033
- Area code: +380 4591

Hornostaipil (Ukrainian: Горностайпіль, Russian: Горностайполь, Yiddish: הארנאסטייפל Horensteipl, Hornosteipel) is a Ukrainian village in northern Ukraine, which is part of Vyshhorod Raion within Kyiv Oblast. It belongs to Ivankiv settlement hromada, one of the hromadas of Ukraine.

== Geography ==
The village is located on the Teteriv River and the Kyiv Reservoir. Part of the former Chernobyl Raion until 1988, it is one of the few villages of this former district that was outside of the Chernobyl Exclusion Zone.

== History ==
Until 18 July 2020, Hornostaipil belonged to Ivankiv Raion. The raion was abolished that day as part of the administrative reform of Ukraine, which reduced the number of raions of Kyiv Oblast to seven. The area of Ivankiv Raion was merged into Vyshhorod Raion.

From February to April 2022, Hornstaipil was occupied by Russia as a result of the 2022 invasion.

== Notable people ==
- Rabbi Yaakov Yisrael Kanievsky was from Hornostaipil.
- Rabbi Mordechai Dov Ber Twersky (Auerbach) served as Rabbi in Hornosteipel from 1863 until his passing in 1903.
- Rabbi Abraham J. Twerski is the uncle of the Grand Rabbi (Rebbe) of the Hornosteipel Hasidic dynasty.
- Otaman Struk was a warlord and pogromist from near Hornostaipil, active in the Civil War of 1918–1919.

== See also ==
- Hornsteipl (Hasidic dynasty)
- Chernobyl disaster
