= Maria Prymachenko =

Ukrainian artist (1908–1997)

- Марія Примаченко
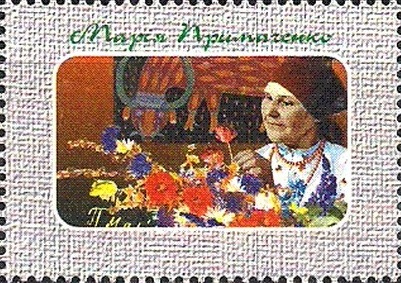
- Born: Mariya Oksentiyivna Prymachenko; 12 January 1909 [O.S. 30 December 1908] Bolotnia, Radomyslsky Uyezd, Kiev Governorate, Russian Empire
- Died: 18 August 1997 (age 88)
- Resting place: Bolotnia, Ivankiv Raion, Ukraine
- Education: Self-taught
- Known for: Painting, drawing, embroidery
- Movement: Naïve art
- Children: Fedir Prymachenko
- Awards: Shevchenko National Prize, 1966

Maria Oksentiyivna Prymachenko (Ukrainian: Марія Оксентіївна Примаченко; 12 January 1909 [O.S. 30 December 1908] – 18 August 1997) was a Ukrainian folk art painter, who worked in the naïve art style. A self-taught artist, she worked in painting, embroidery and ceramics.

In 1966, Prymachenko was awarded the Taras Shevchenko National Prize of Ukraine. The United Nations Educational, Scientific and Cultural Organization (UNESCO) declared that 2009 was the year of Prymachenko. A street in Kyiv and a minor planet are both named after her. Pablo Picasso once said, after visiting a Prymachenko exhibition in Paris at the 1937 World's Fair, "I bow down before the artistic miracle of this brilliant Ukrainian."

== Personal life ==
Prymachenko was born to a peasant family and spent the majority of her life in the village of Bolotnia, currently in Vyshhorod Raion, Kyiv Oblast, situated only 30 km (19 mi) from Chornobyl. She attended school for four years, before contracting polio, leaving her with a physical impairment, which impacted her life and art. She described her first artistic experiments in later life: "Once, as a young girl, I was tending a gaggle of geese. When I got with them to a sandy beach, on the bank of the river, after crossing a field dotted with wild flowers, I began to draw real and imaginary flowers with a stick on the sand… Later, I decided to paint the walls of my house using natural pigments. After that I've never stopped drawing and painting."

During childhood, Prymachenko's mother taught her embroidery, and by the late 1920s or early 1930s she was a member of the Ivankiv Co-operative Embroidery Association. Her talent was recognised by the artist Tetiana Floru, who invited Prymachenko to work at the Central Experimental Workshop of the Kyiv Museum of Ukrainian Art in 1935.

In Kyiv, Prymachenko underwent two operations, which enabled her to stand unaided. Also, she met her partner, Vasyl Marynchuk, there. In March 1941, their son Fedir Prymachenko was born in Kyiv. She and Marynchuk did not have time to get married before he went to war; he did not return, dying in Finland. Prymachenko's brother was killed by the Nazis. She returned to Ivankiv and worked on a collective farm. Fedir also became a folk artist and a master of naiveté; he died in 2008. Prymachenko's grandsons Petro and Ivan also became artists.

== Career ==
"Wild chaplun" 1977, on Ukrainian postage stamp (1999)

"Pea beast" 1971, on Ukrainian postage stamp (1999)

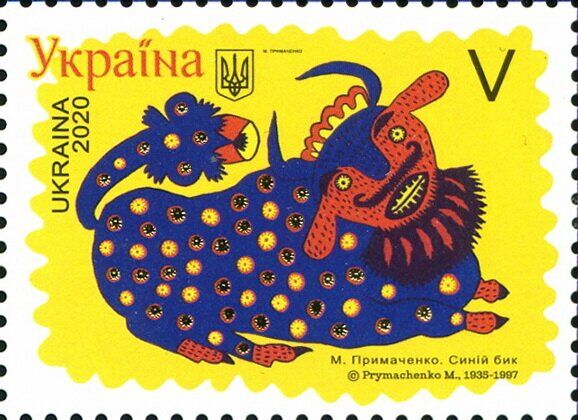
Maria Prymachenko "Blue bull" 1947, on Ukrainian postage stamp (2020)

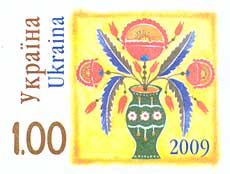
Ukrainian postage stamp (2009)

The 1936 First Republican Exhibition of Folk Art featured Prymachenko's paintings. This exhibition was shown in Moscow, Leningrad, and Warsaw. Prymachenko was awarded a first-degree diploma for participating in this exhibition of folk art. In 1937, the artist's works were exhibited in Paris.

Prymachenko's works were inspired by Ukrainian, and in particular Polesian, folk traditions. They include references to the natural world and to fairy-tales. During the 1930s, she made a transition from embroidery to painting, and her works from this period are painted onto white backgrounds. Her bold and expressive linework was developing and she was combining traditional Ukrainian motifs in new ways.

During the 1960s to 1980s, her style continued to develop, with paintings having an increasingly vibrant colour palette and a new choice of bright backgrounds for her works. At this time she moved from working in watercolour to working in gouache. In the 1970s, Prymachenko also began to include short phrases or proverbs on the reverse of her canvases, which related to the topic of the work.

== Awards and recognition ==
In 1966, Prymachenko was awarded the Taras Shevchenko National Prize of Ukraine. The United Nations Educational, Scientific and Cultural Organization (UNESCO) declared that 2009 was the year of Prymachenko. The same year, the Likhachev boulevard in Kyiv was renamed in her honour.

Pablo Picasso once said, after visiting a Prymachenko exhibition in Paris, "I bow down before the artistic miracle of this brilliant Ukrainian."

== Legacy ==
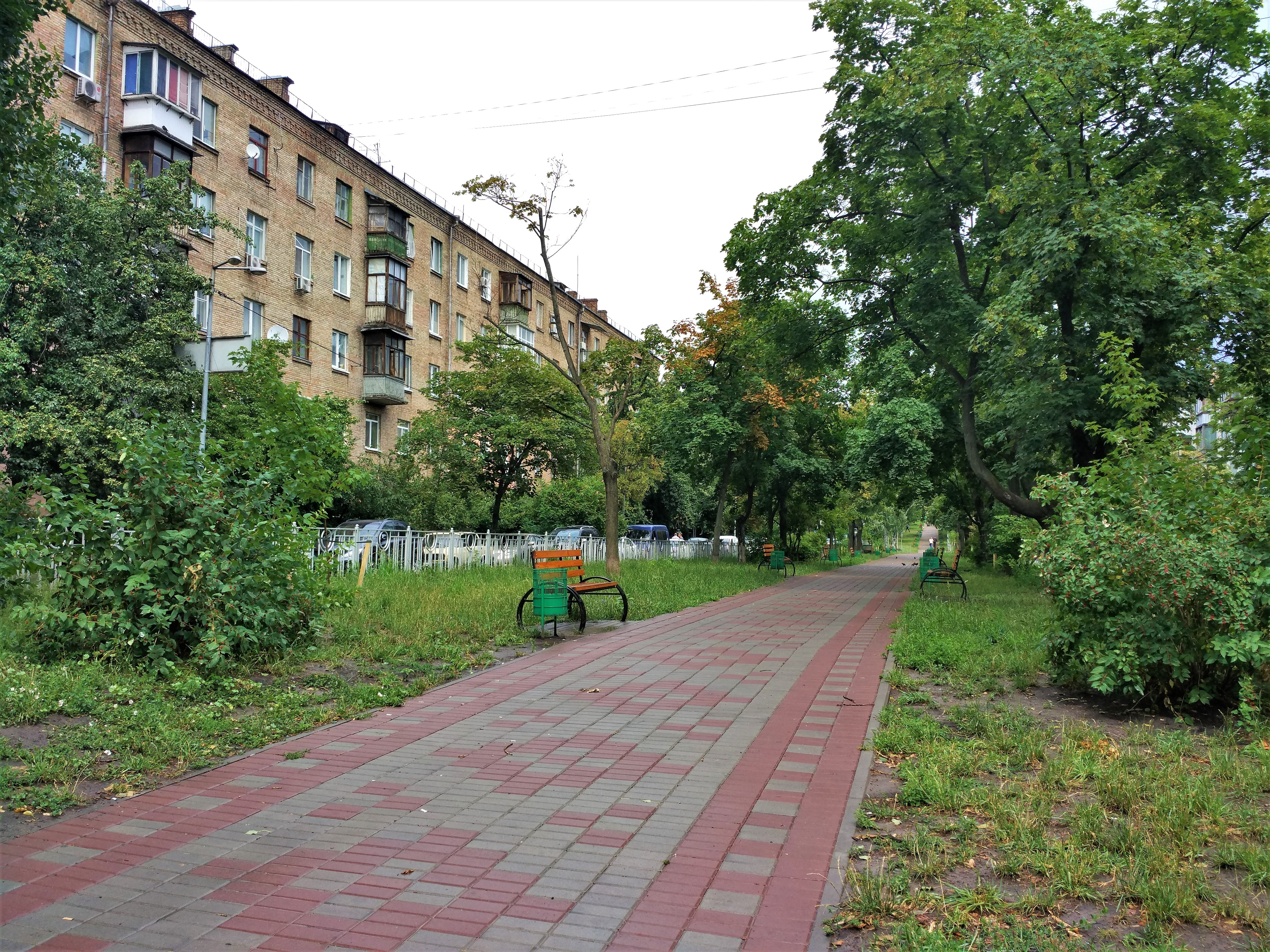
Maria Pryimachenko boulevard in Kyiv

Prymachenko's compositions were exhibited all over the former Soviet Union, Ukraine and other countries, including Poland, Bulgaria, France and Canada. Over 650 of Prymachenko's works are held in the collection of the National Folk Decorative Art Museum. Her painting Rat on a Journey was copied by the famous Finnish designer Kristina Isola to a fabric design Folks in the Woods, which was also used by Finnair for aircraft décor. Her work is featured on stamps and coins from Ukraine. In 2019, the Odesa artist Stepan Ryabchenko dedicated his work to the work of Maria Prymachenko, combining her and his heroes in a large-scale panorama Dzherelo, which is located in Kyiv, at 5 Georgii Kirpa Street.

In 2022 the Ukrainian House in Kyiv held a unique art exhibition called “Maria Paints”. It consisted of 100 previously Unknown Works by Maria Prymachenko from the private collection of the famous Kyiv art critic, Eduard Dymshyts. Following Russia's full-scale invasion of Ukraine in 2022, the Prymachenko painting Flowers grew near the fourth power unit was sold at a charity auction organized by the Serhiy Prytula Charitable Foundation for $500,000. The painting is from Prymachenko's Chernobyl series.

In October 2023 - April 2024, Maria Prymachenko's works are exhibited at The Ukrainian Museum in New York. It features over 100 paintings, unique ceramic works, bespoke embroidered blouses, wooden plates, and several children’s illustration books. It is the first exhibition of Prymachenko’s art outside of Europe. In November 2024, the exhibition Dvi Marii was opened in the National Reserve "Sophia of Kyiv", which was dedicated to the work of two artists of naïve art – Maria Prymachenko and Mariia Halushko.

In 1998, the minor planet (142624) Prymachenko was named by Klim Churyumov in her honour.

== Loss of works ==
The Ivankiv Historical and Local History Museum, where several works by Prymachenko were held, was burned after a deliberate attack on a museum during the 2022 Russian invasion of Ukraine, with the reported loss of 25 of her works. However, according to a social media post by journalist Tanya Goncharova, local people were able to save some of Prymachenko's works from the fire. According to an interview with Prymachenko's great-granddaughter, Anastasiia Prymachenko, in The Times, ten of her works were saved by a local man who entered the museum whilst it was on fire.

Vlada Litovchenko, director of the Vyshhorod Historical and Cultural Reserve, noted that the museum was home to not only Prymachenko's works, but to other Ukrainian artists, such as Hanna Veres, as well; she stated: "Another one of the irreparable losses of the historical-cultural authority of Ukraine is the destruction of the Ivankiv Historical-Cultural Museum by the aggressor in these hellish days for our country."

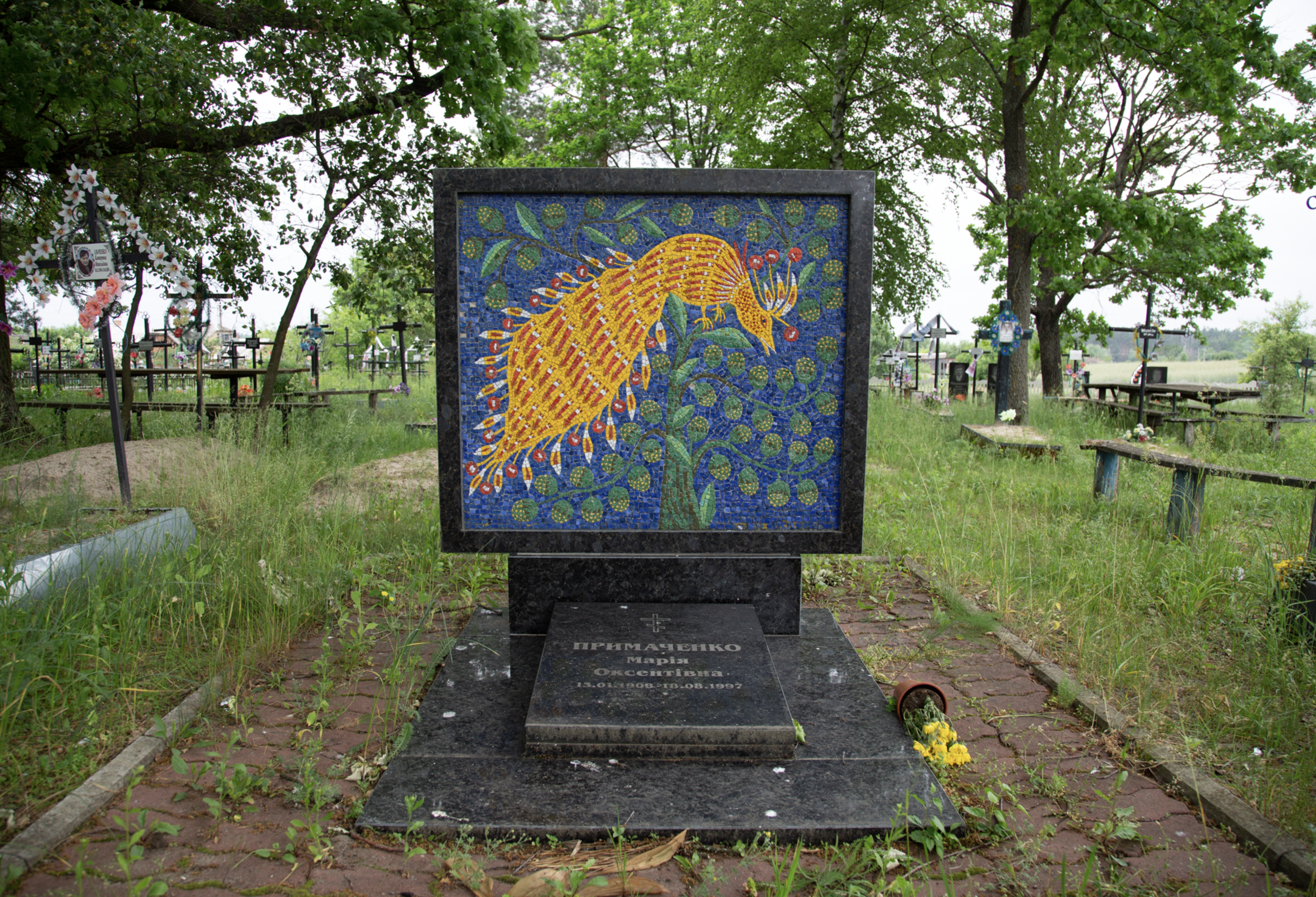
Grave of Maria Prymachenko in the village of Bolotnia, Kyiv region.

== See also ==
- Yuriy Khimich (1928–2003)
