= Chernobyl Raion =

Subdivision of the USSR

Chernobyl Raion Чорнобильський район Chornobyl Raion
- Raion of Kyiv Oblast
- 1923–1988
- Chernobyl Raion on the map of Kyiv Oblast. The exclusion zone is marked as grey.
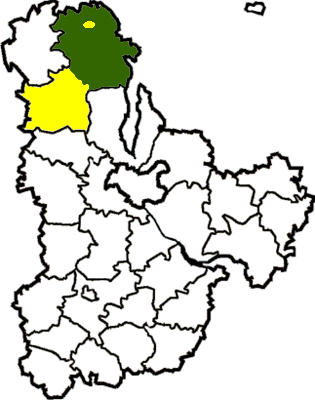
- The former Chernobyl Raion (green) was placed under the Ivankiv Raion (yellow). The yellow dot represents the city of Pripyat, autonomous since 1980
- Capital: Chernobyl
- Area
  - Coordinates: 51°16′N 30°13′E
  - 1984: 2,000 km^{2} (770 sq mi)
- Population
  - 1984: 44,000
- History
  - Established: 1923
  - Merged into Ivankiv Raion: 16 November 1988
- Political subdivisions: 1 municipality 23 rural councils
Preceded by	Succeeded by
Chernobyl uezd; Radomysl uezd	Ivankiv Raion
- Today part of: Vyshhorod Raion

Chernobyl Raion (Russian: Чернобыльский район, romanized: Chernobyl'skiy rayon) or Chornobyl Raion (Ukrainian: Чорнобильський район, romanized: Chornobylskyi raion) was a raion in the Soviet Union located in the Ukrainian Soviet Socialist Republic. It was one of 26 administrative raions (districts) of Kyiv Oblast in northern Ukraine. After the Chernobyl disaster, the majority of the raion was contaminated, and many of its populated places were included into the Chernobyl Exclusion Zone, which is an officially designated exclusion area around the site of the disaster.

== Geography ==
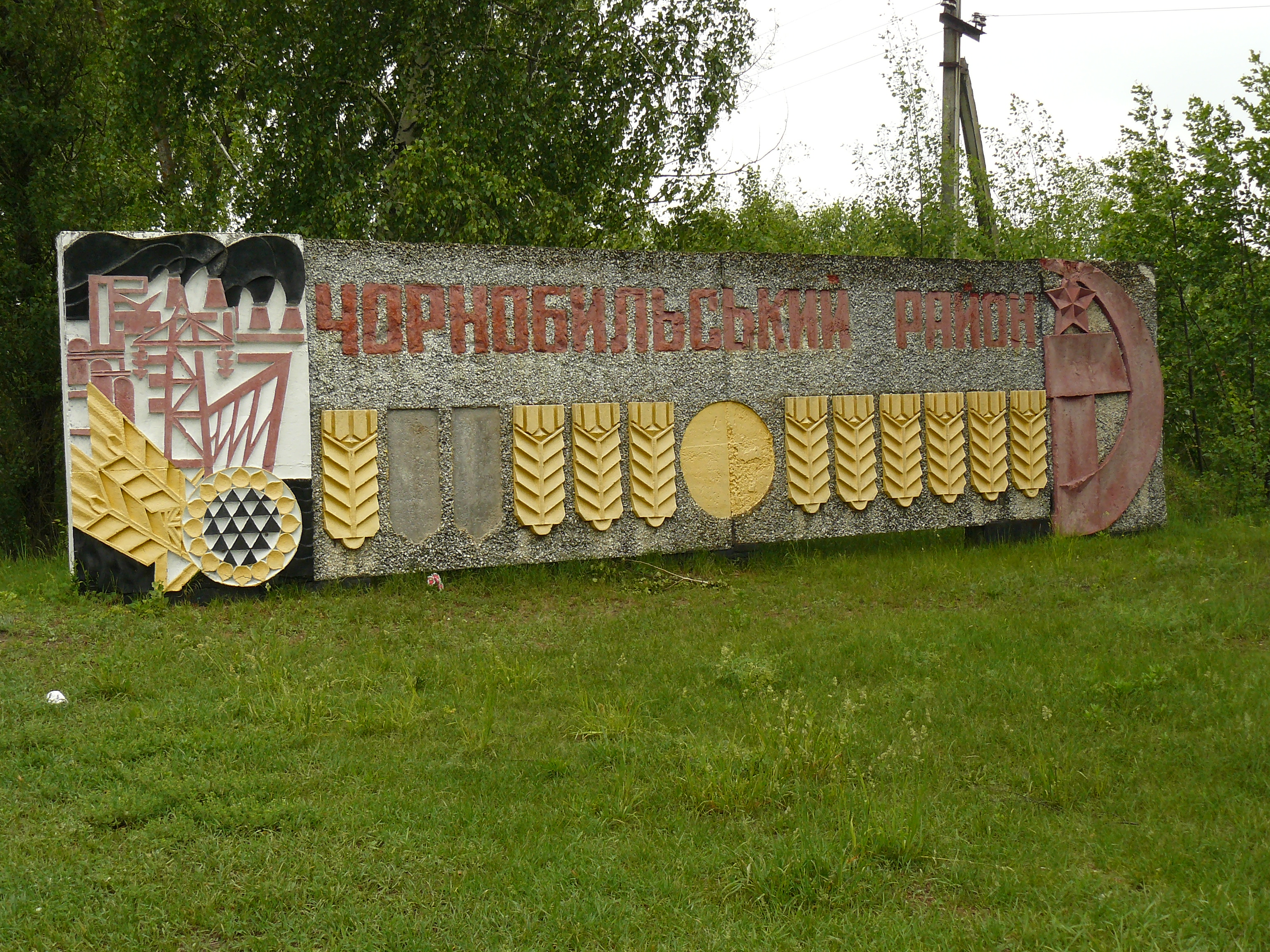
The original entrance sign to the raion features Soviet designs.

The Chernobyl Raion was located in the northern portion of Kyiv Oblast, at the time an administrative portion of the Ukrainian Soviet Socialist Republic. To the raion's east, it bordered upon the Kyiv Reservoir; to its south, the Vyshhorod Raion; to its southwest, the Ivankiv Raion; and to its west, the Poliske Raion, significant portions of which also suffered due to the Chernobyl disaster.

Today, the territory of the former raion is administratively part of the Vyshhorod Raion (Note: De facto the area of the former raion is located within and is governed by the specially designated Chernobyl Exclusion Zone.) (prior to the 2020 reform, it was part of the Ivankiv Raion). Prior to its liquidation, the Chernobyl Raion had an area of 2,000 km^{2} (770 mi^{2}) and a population of 44,000. The Pripyat River flows through the territory of the former raion before emptying into the Kyiv Reservoir.

== History ==
The Chernobyl Raion was established in 1923 out of transformation of Radomyslsky County and Chernobyl County (uyezds) which was created in 1919 within the Kyiv Governorate following an administrative reorganization of the Ukrainian Soviet Socialist Republic. From its creation in 1923 until 1941, its administrative center was the urban-type settlement of Chernobyl; after 1941, the settlement's status was upgraded to that of a city of district significance.

On 16 November 1988, the Chernobyl Raion was liquidated and merged with the Ivankiv Raion based on a decree of the Presidium of the Supreme Soviet of the Ukrainian SSR. In 1996, the remaining populated settlements of the Chernobyl Raion that weren't evacuated after the disaster were transferred to the Ivankiv Raion's administration.

Today, most of the district former territory is located in the exclusion zone, where the ChNPP (Chernobyl Nuclear-Power Plant) service personnel live on a shift basis, and 135 (as of October 2017) samosely or "self-settlers" permanently reside. Most of the radionuclides are contained in the upper soil layer. Notwithstanding the foregoing, most places are harmless to humans – there are only about 3–4 MK3V of gamma radiation. On July 17, 2020, the areas of the Poliske Raion and the Ivankiv Raion (thus, the territory of the former Chernobyl Raion), as well as the city of Slavutych, were merged into Vyshhorod Raion as part of the Decentralisation in Ukraine.

== Administrative divisions ==
=== Overview ===
Before it was liquidated, the Chernobyl Raion had one city council (miskrada) under its administration (the administrative center Chernobyl), and 23 rural councils (silrada), to which 69 villages were subordinated. There was a total of 70 populated places in the raion.

The city of Pripyat, which was established in 1970 for workers and families of the Chernobyl Nuclear Power Plant, was formerly administratively subordinate to the Chernobyl Raion. In 1980, it was given the status of a city of regional significance, administratively subordinate to the Kyiv Oblast authorities rather than the Chernobyl Raion.

=== Settlements ===
- Inside the Exclusion Zone: Chernobyl (city), Andriivka, Benivka, Buda, Bychky, Buriakivka, Chapaievka, Cherevach, Chistohalivka, Hlynka, Horodchan, Horodyshche, Illintsi, Ilovnytsia, Ivanivka, Kamianka, Kopachi, Kosharivka, Koshivka, Kotsiubynske, Krasne/Masheve, Krasne/Tovstyi Lis, Kryva Hora, Kupuvate, Ladyzhychi, Leliv, Masheve, Nova Krasnytsia, Novoshepelychi, Novosilky, Opachychi, Otashiv, Paryshiv, Pliutovyshche, Rozizhdzhe, Rozsokha, Rudky, Rudnia-Illinetska, Rudnia-Veresnia, Stara Krasnytsia, Stari Shepelychi, Starosillia, Stechanka, Terekhy, Teremtsi, Tovstyi Lis, Usiv, Yampil, Yaniv (until 1980, administered by the city of Pripyat), Zalissia, Zamoshnia, Zapillia, Zymovyshche.
- Outside the Exclusion Zone: Dytiatky, Fruzynivka, Hubyn, Hornostaipil, Laputky, Medvyn, Strakholissya, Zoryn.

== See also ==
- Samosely
- Administrative divisions of the Ukrainian SSR
