= Ivankiv settlement hromada =

Ivankiv settlement hromada Іванківська селищна громада
- Hromada
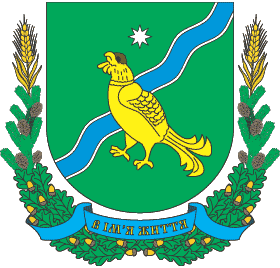
- Seal
- Interactive map of Ivankiv settlement hromada
- Country: Ukraine
- Oblast: Kyiv Oblast
- Raion: Vyshhorod Raion

Area
  - Total: 1,779.6 km^{2} (687.1 sq mi)

Population (2020)
  - Total: 28,798
  - Density: 16.182/km^{2} (41.912/sq mi)
- Settlements: 81
- Villages: 80
- Towns: 1

Ivankiv settlement hromada (Ukrainian: Іванківська селищна громада) is a hromada of Ukraine, located in Vyshhorod Raion, Kyiv Oblast. Its administrative center is the town of Ivankiv.

It has an area of 1,779.6 square kilometres (687.1 mi^{2}) and a population of 28,798, as of 2020.

The hromada includes 81 settlements: 1 town (Ivankiv), and 80 villages:

- Bilyi Bereh
- Blidcha
- Bolotnia
- Buda-Polidarivska
- Varivsk
- Verholissia
- Voropaivka
- Hornostaipil
- Hubyn
- Dymarka
- Dityatky
- Domanivka
- Zhereva
- Zherevpillia
- Zhmiivka
- Zaprudka
- Zaruddia
- Zakharivka
- Zymovyshche
- Zoryn
- Kalynove
- Karpylivka
- Kovalivka
- Kolentsi
- Kolentsivske
- Krasylivka
- Kropyvnia
- Kukhari
- Laputky
- Leonivka
- Liudvynivka
- Makarivka
- Mala Makarivka
- Medvyn
- Mokra Korma
- Musiiky
- Novi Makalevichi
- Novi Sokoly
- Obukhovychi
- Olyva
- Olizarivka
- Orane
- Osovets
- Pyrohovychi
- Pidhaine
- Pisky
- Polidarivka
- Potaliivka
- Potoky
- Prybirsk
- Rakhvalivka
- Rozvazhiv
- Rokytna Sloboda
- Rudnia-Levkivska
- Rudnia-Sydorivska
- Rudnia-Talska
- Rudnia-Shpylivska
- Rusaky
- Sydorovychi
- Sloboda-Kukharska
- Sosnivka
- Stavrivka
- Stanishivka
- Staryi Mist
- Stari Sokoly
- Starovychi
- Stepanivka
- Strakholissia
- Sukachi
- Termakhivka
- Teterivske
- Fedorivka
- Fenevichi
- Fruzynivka
- Khocheva
- Chkalovka
- Shevchenkove
- Shevchenkove
- Shpyli
- Yakhnivka

== See also ==
- List of hromadas of Ukraine
