= Ivankiv Raion =

Former subdivision of Kyiv Oblast, Ukraine

Ivankiv Raion Іванківський район
- 1923–2020
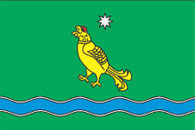
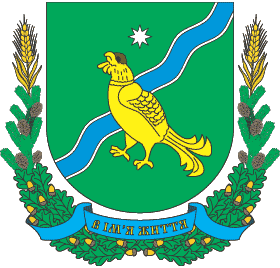
- Flag Coat of arms

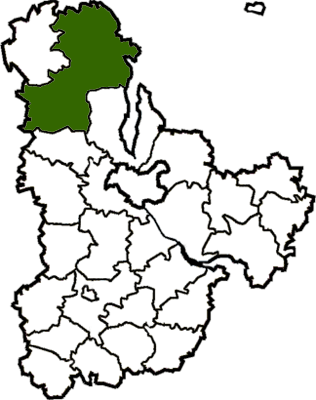
- Capital: Ivankiv
- Area
  - Coordinates: 51°7′22″N 30°0′14″E
- History
  - Established: 1923
  - Disestablished: 2020
Succeeded by
Vyshhorod Raion

Ivankiv Raion (Ukrainian: Іванківський район) was a raion (district) of Kyiv Oblast in Ukraine. Its administrative center was the urban-type settlement of Ivankiv. The raion was abolished on 18 July 2020 as part of the administrative reform of Ukraine, which reduced the number of raions of Kyiv Oblast to seven. With that change, the area of Ivankiv Raion was merged into Vyshhorod Raion. The last estimate of the raion population was 29,174 (2020 est.).

== Overview ==
The raion expanded in 1986 after the disestablishment of the Chernobyl Raion due to the Chernobyl disaster. Henceforth Ivankiv Raion administered the former territory of the depopulated region that is majorly part of the zone of alienation and supervised by the State Emergency Service of Ukraine.

== Subdivisions ==
At the time of disestablishment, the raion consisted of one hromada, Ivankiv settlement hromada with the administration in Ivankiv.

== Gallery ==
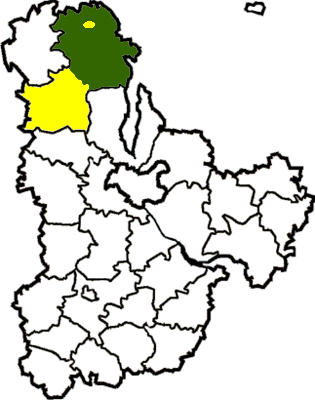
Locator map showing Ivankiv Raion (yellow) before 1988. The former Chernobyl Raion is shown in green, and the yellow dot represents the city of Pripyat, autonomous since 1980

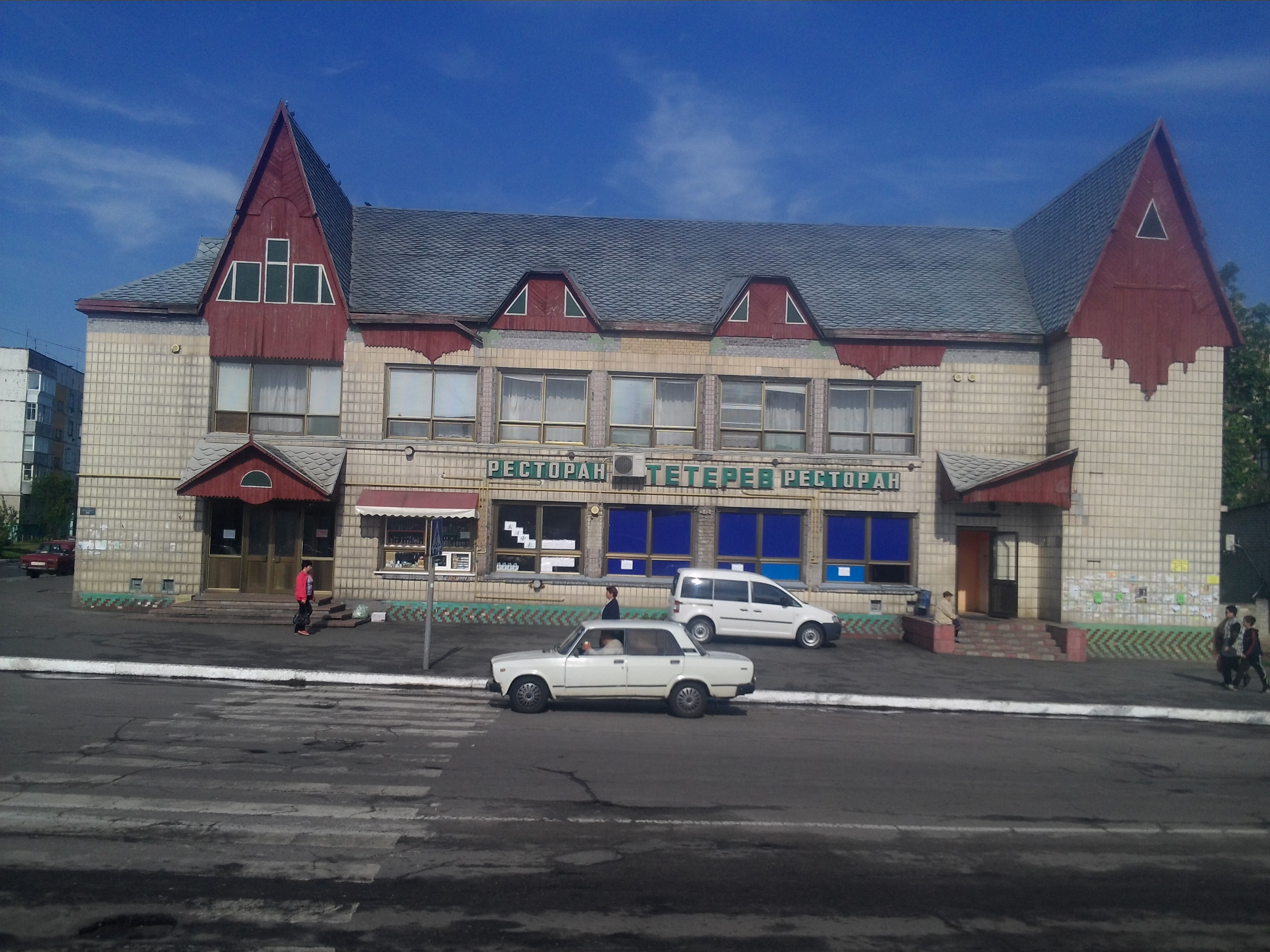
A restaurant in Ivankiv

== See also ==
- Pripyat
- Chernobyl
- Hornostaipil
- Dytiatky
