= Capture of Chernobyl =

Part of the 2022 Russian invasion of Ukraine

- Part of the Kyiv offensive of the Russian invasion of Ukraine
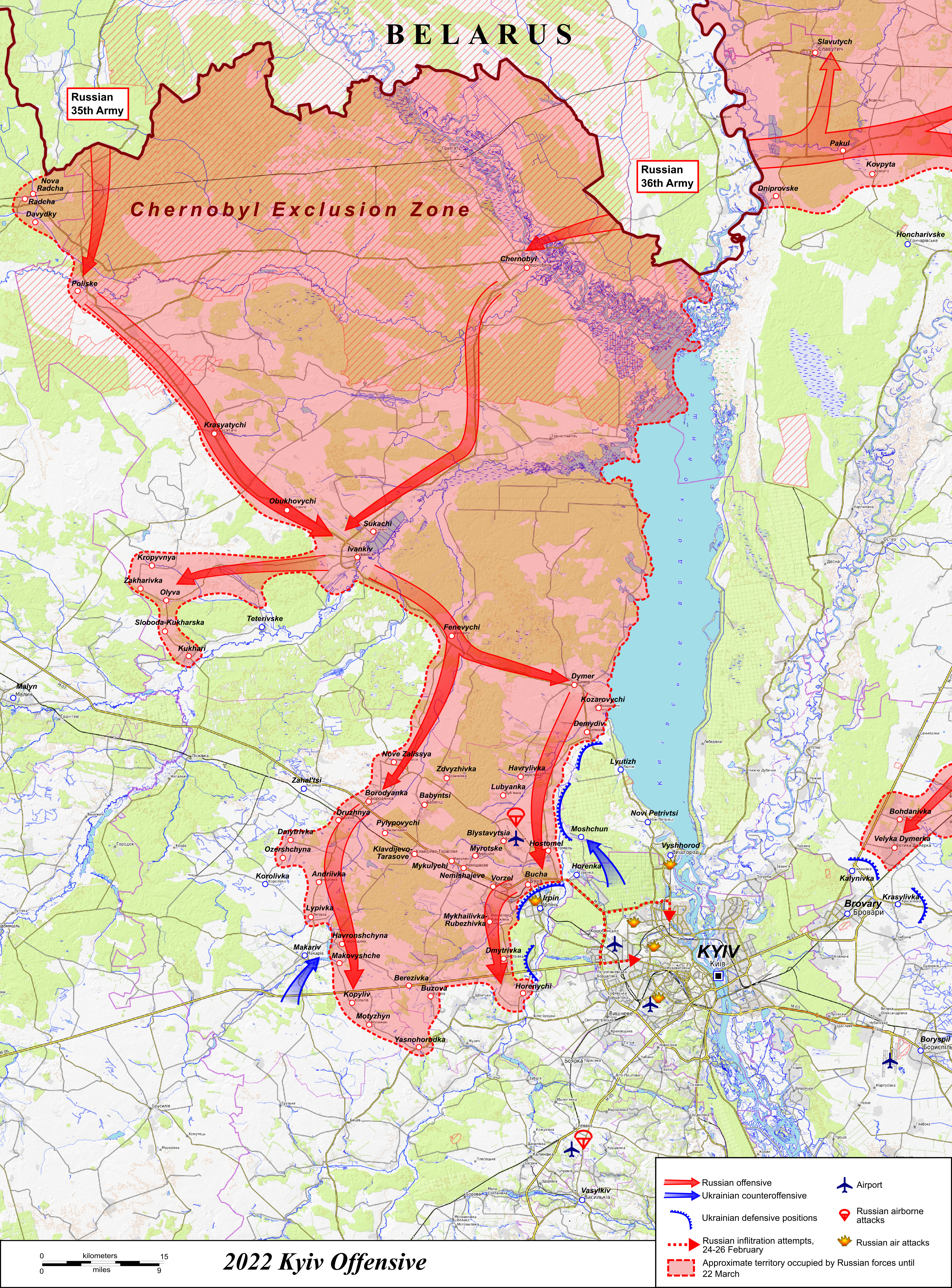
- A map of Russian-occupied territory in northern Ukraine during the Kyiv offensive
Date	24 February 2022
Location	Chernobyl Exclusion Zone (Chernobyl and Pripyat), Ukraine 51°16′N 30°13′E
Result	Russian victory
Territorial changes	Russia captures the Chernobyl Exclusion Zone and Chernobyl Nuclear Power Plant; withdraws in April 2022

Belligerents
Russia	Ukraine

Casualties and losses
Several injured and 1 dead due to acute radiation syndrome	169 captured
- 300 civilians captured

During the 2022 Russian invasion of Ukraine, the Chernobyl Exclusion Zone was captured on 24 February, the first day of the invasion, by the Russian Armed Forces, who entered Ukrainian territory from neighbouring Belarus and seized the entire area of the Chernobyl Nuclear Power Plant by the end of that day. On 7 March, it was reported that around 300 people (100 workers and 200 security guards for the plant) were trapped and had been unable to leave the power plant since its capture. On 31 March, it was reported that most of the Russian troops occupying the area had withdrawn, as the Russian military abandoned the Kyiv offensive to focus on operations in Eastern Ukraine.

== Background ==
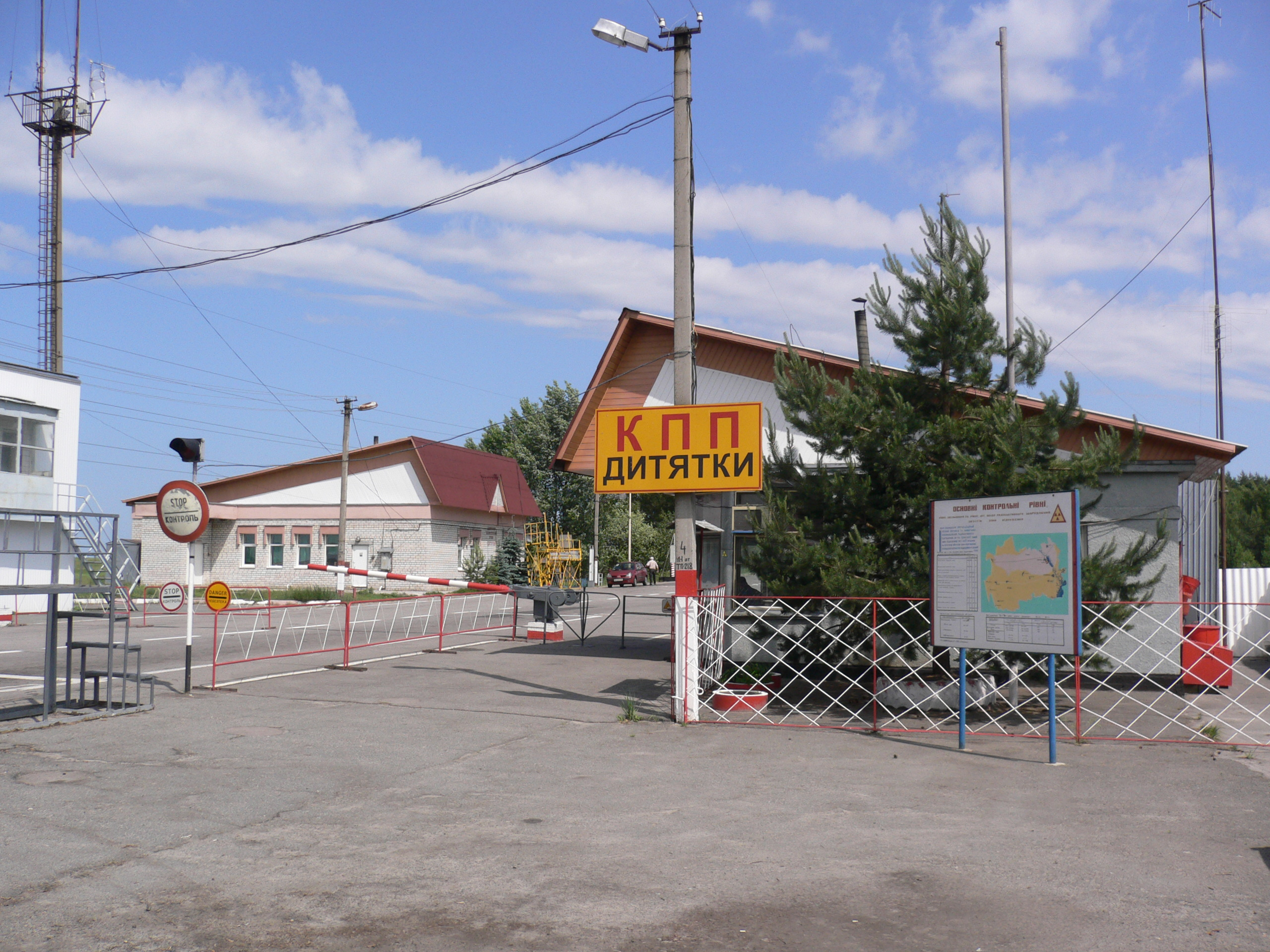
A security checkpoint in the Chernobyl Exclusion Zone, 2010

The Chernobyl disaster in 1986 released large quantities of radioactive material from the Chernobyl Nuclear Power Plant into the surrounding environment. The area in a 30 kilometres (19 mi) radius surrounding the exploded reactor was evacuated and sealed off by Soviet authorities. This area was formalised as the Chernobyl Exclusion Zone; its boundaries have changed over time. Following the dissolution of the Soviet Union, this area became part of newly independent Ukraine and was managed by the State Emergency Service of Ukraine.

Chernobyl is 130 kilometres (81 mi) north of Kyiv and the regional road PO2 connecting Chernobyl and Kyiv is in relatively good condition, thus creating a direct strategic corridor to Kyiv, which Russian forces could exploit to capture the capital. The exclusion zone is located right on the border with Belarus, a Russian ally which allowed a military buildup in their territory. On 16 February 2022, satellite imagery showed Russian troops building pontoon bridges over rivers on the Belarusian side of the exclusion zone, the Polesie State Radioecological Reserve.

== Attack and capture ==
At 7 a.m. on 24 February 2022, a scheduled shift change for the workers in the power plant was cancelled, the workers being informed that Russia had launched a full-out invasion of Ukraine, and that the plant was to be put on high alert. That morning, there were around 300 people within the exclusion zone, including nuclear staff, medical staff, firefighters, 169 soldiers of the 1st Nuclear Power Plant Protection Battalion and four tourists.

A few hours later, Russian forces that had been stationed in Belarus broke into the exclusion zone through the village of Vilcha. By 2 p.m., they had reached the power plant's main administration office. In the following hours, the National Guard commanders and the staff administration negotiated a surrender with the Russian forces, and the Ukrainian government publicly announced that Russian forces had launched an attack on the Chernobyl Exclusion Zone. The Russian troops had conducted military exercises one year before at the Kursk Nuclear Power Plant in Russia, which was almost identical to the Chernobyl plant and knew its layout very well.

The Ukrainian garrison in Chernobyl were not armed with heavy weapons or equipment, and thus could not fight Russian armored vehicles. The Ukrainian soldiers were encircled and two Tigr armored vehicles of the Russian Special Operations Forces entered the territory of the Nuclear Power Plant and gave an ultimatum, forcing the National Guard soldiers to surrender immediately.

By the end of the day, the Ukrainian government announced that Russian forces had captured Chernobyl and Pripyat. Following the Russian capture of the exclusion zone, the American government announced "credible reports that Russian soldiers are currently holding the staff of the Chernobyl facilities hostage".

The International Atomic Energy Agency (IAEA) said "there had been no casualties nor destruction at the industrial site". Russia later reported that it was "working with Ukrainians to secure" the site.

== Russian occupation ==
Staff who had been working when the power plant was captured were unable to leave during the Russian occupation, and continued to maintain the plant's operation. The staff refused several requests by the Russian forces to be interviewed on Zvezda, a TV channel owned by the Russian Ministry of Defence. Russian forces set up a number of security checkpoints throughout the station and kept the staff under close surveillance.

On 9 March 2022, Ukrainian Minister of Foreign Affairs Dmytro Kuleba said that the power supply of the Chernobyl NPP was damaged, it had lost power, and the diesel generator backup systems only had enough fuel to support cooling operations for 48 hours, so there was a danger of radiation leaks. The risk was uncertain, but Russian military operations had already caused nuclear risks when they caused a fire in the takeover of the Zaporizhzhia Nuclear Power Plant. Russian Ministry of Foreign Affairs spokeswoman Maria Zakharova claimed that the National Guard of Russia was running a "joint operation" with local workers and surrendered Ukrainian soldiers to maintain the containment operations of the Chernobyl NPP.

The IAEA released a statement expressing concern about the situation, but considered that the disconnection did not pose an immediate critical risk to operations, considering that the large volumes of water allowed sufficient cooling without electricity. Nevertheless, the agency recognised that lack of electricity was likely to deteriorate radiation safety, specifically through the increased workload and stress on the 210 personnel working without shift changes at the site. The IAEA has also expressed concern about the interruption of communications and the capacity of personnel to make decisions without undue pressure. On 10 March 2022, it was reported that all contact was lost.

On 20 March, Russian forces allowed some of the power plant's staff to leave and return home, in a swap with volunteers of staff that had been outside of the plant when it was captured to replace them. Six days later, Slavutych, the town constructed to house workers at the Chernobyl Nuclear Power Plant following the disaster, was attacked by Russian forces.

=== Potential radiation exposure ===
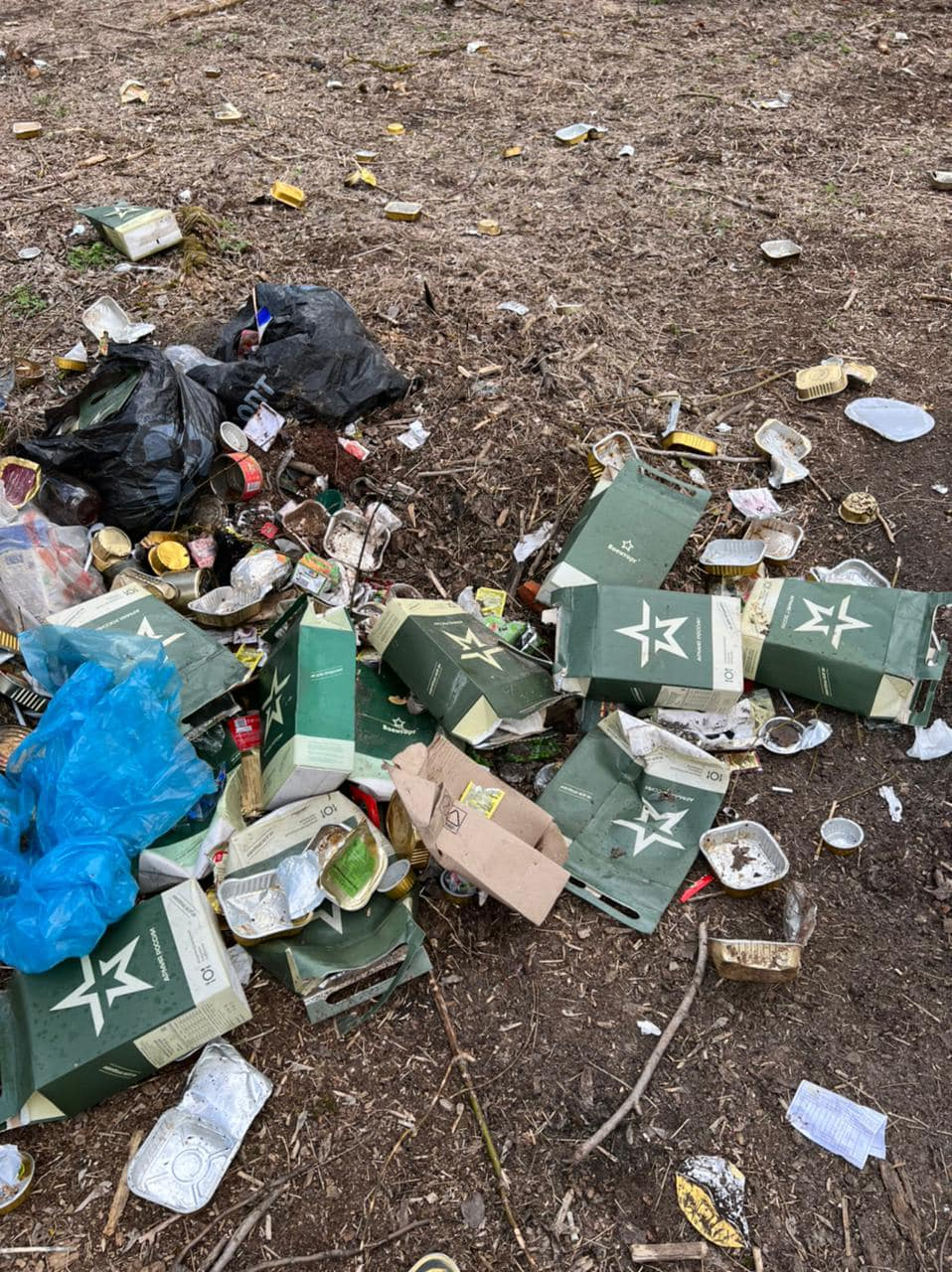
Packages of Russian field rations left at the Red Forest

Reuters reported that the Russian forces used the Red Forest as a route for their convoys, kicking up clouds of radioactive dust. Local workers said the Russian soldiers moving in those convoys were not using protective suits and could have potentially endangered themselves. On 31 March 2022, a Ukrainian council member of the State Agency of Ukraine for Exclusion Zone Management claimed on his Facebook page that Russian troops were regularly removed from the exclusion zone surrounding Chernobyl and taken to the Republican Scientific and Practical Center for Radiation Medicine and Human Ecology in Gomel, Belarus. This rumor led to further speculation in the press that the soldiers were suffering from acute radiation syndrome. One Russian trooper was reported to have died due to radiation. On 6 April, images and videos of trenches, foxholes and other defensive structures at the Red Forest surfaced on the internet and news outlets.

Local workers and scientists said Russian troops looted radioactive material from the laboratories.

== Russian withdrawal ==
On 29 March, Russian Deputy Minister of Defense Alexander Fomin announced a withdrawal of Russian forces from the Kyiv area, and on 1 April the State Agency on Exclusion Zone Management announced that Russian troops had completely withdrawn from the Chernobyl NPP.

Following the Russian withdrawal, staff at the power plant raised the Ukrainian flag back over the plant. IAEA Director General Rafael Grossi announced that the IAEA would be sending a support mission to the plant "as soon as possible." On 3 April, Ukrainian forces re-entered the exclusion zone.

Following the return of Ukrainian control, significant damage to parts of the plant's offices was noted, including graffiti and smashed windows. The Washington Post further estimated that around 135 million US dollars' worth of equipment had been destroyed, namely computers, vehicles, and radiation dosimeters.

== Reactions ==
Ukrainian President Volodymyr Zelenskyy called the Russian capture of the zone a "declaration of war against the whole of Europe".

Mykhailo Podolyak, adviser to the head of the Office of the President of Ukraine, was quoted as saying that it was a "totally pointless attack", and "the condition of the former Chernobyl nuclear power plant, confinement, and nuclear waste storage facilities is unknown". The International Atomic Energy Agency stated that there were "no casualties nor destruction at the industrial site" but that it was "of vital importance that the safe and secure operations of the nuclear facilities in that zone should not be affected or disrupted in any way".

== Analysis ==
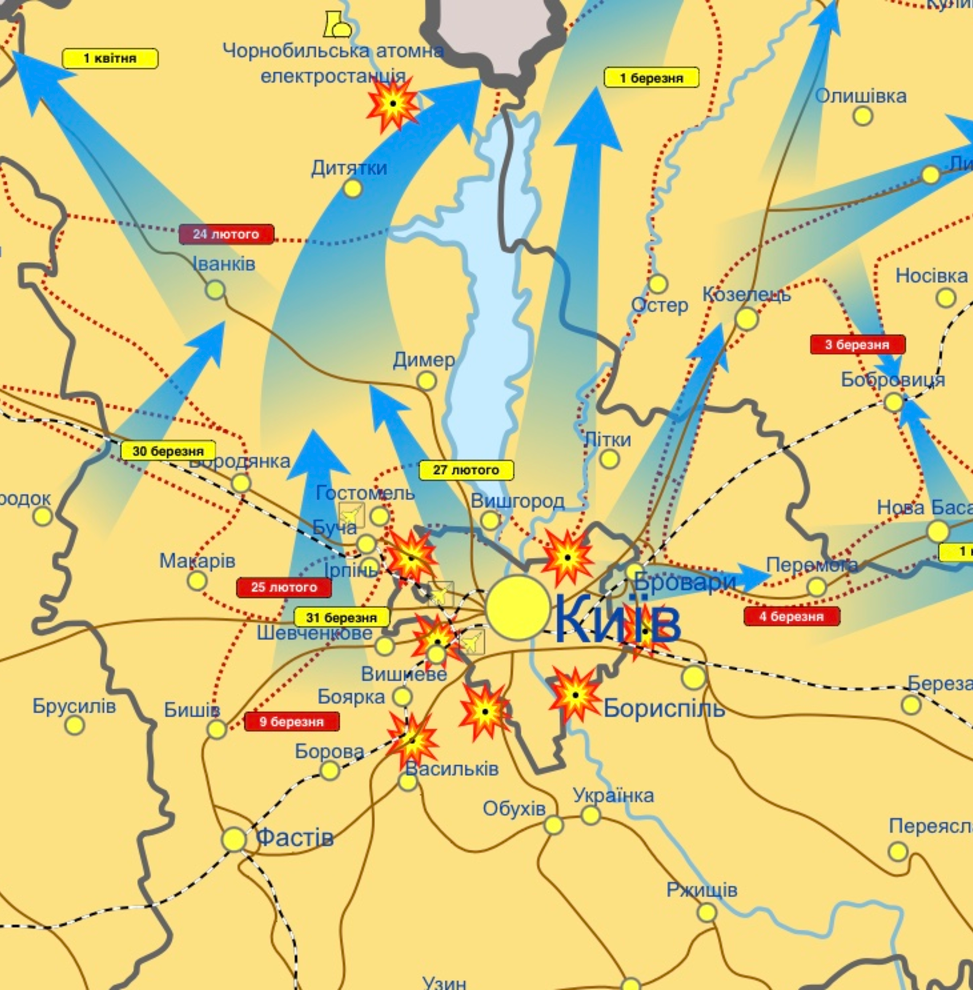
Retreat of Russian troops from Kyiv in late March - early April 2022

In the greater picture of the Kyiv offensive, the capture of Chernobyl could be considered a waypoint for Russian troops advancing towards Kyiv. Ben Hodges, former commanding general of the United States Army Europe, stated that the exclusion zone was "important because of where it sits... If Russian forces were attacking Kyiv from the north, Chernobyl is right there on the way." Former American Deputy Assistant Secretary of Defense for Russia, Ukraine, Eurasia Evelyn Farkas said that the Russian forces "want to surround the capital" and that they "certainly don't want loose nuclear material floating around" in case of a Ukrainian insurgency.

The exclusion zone is important for containing fallout from the Chernobyl nuclear disaster of 1986; as such, Ukrainian Ministry of Internal Affairs adviser Anton Herashchenko said that "if the occupiers' artillery strikes hit the nuclear waste storage facility, radioactive dust may cover the territories of Ukraine, Belarus and the EU countries". According to BBC News, monitoring stations in the area reported a 20-fold increase in radiation levels, up to 65 μSv/h. For comparison, the average person is exposed to 0.41 μSv/h from background radiation. At 65 μSv/h it would require more than a month of continuous exposure to meet the conservative yearly exposure limit for US radiation workers. This does not account for inhaled or ingested radioactive particles, which increase exposure rates. Claire Corkhill of the University of Sheffield stated that the increase was localised and was due in part to "increased movement of people and vehicles in and around the Chernobyl zone [that] will have kicked up radioactive dust that's on the ground".

== See also ==
- Chernobyl Nuclear Power Plant drone strike
- Battle of Enerhodar
- Environmental impact of the Russian invasion of Ukraine
- Impact of the Russian invasion of Ukraine on nuclear power plants
- Russian occupation of Kyiv Oblast
