= Tarasy =

Tarasy Тараси
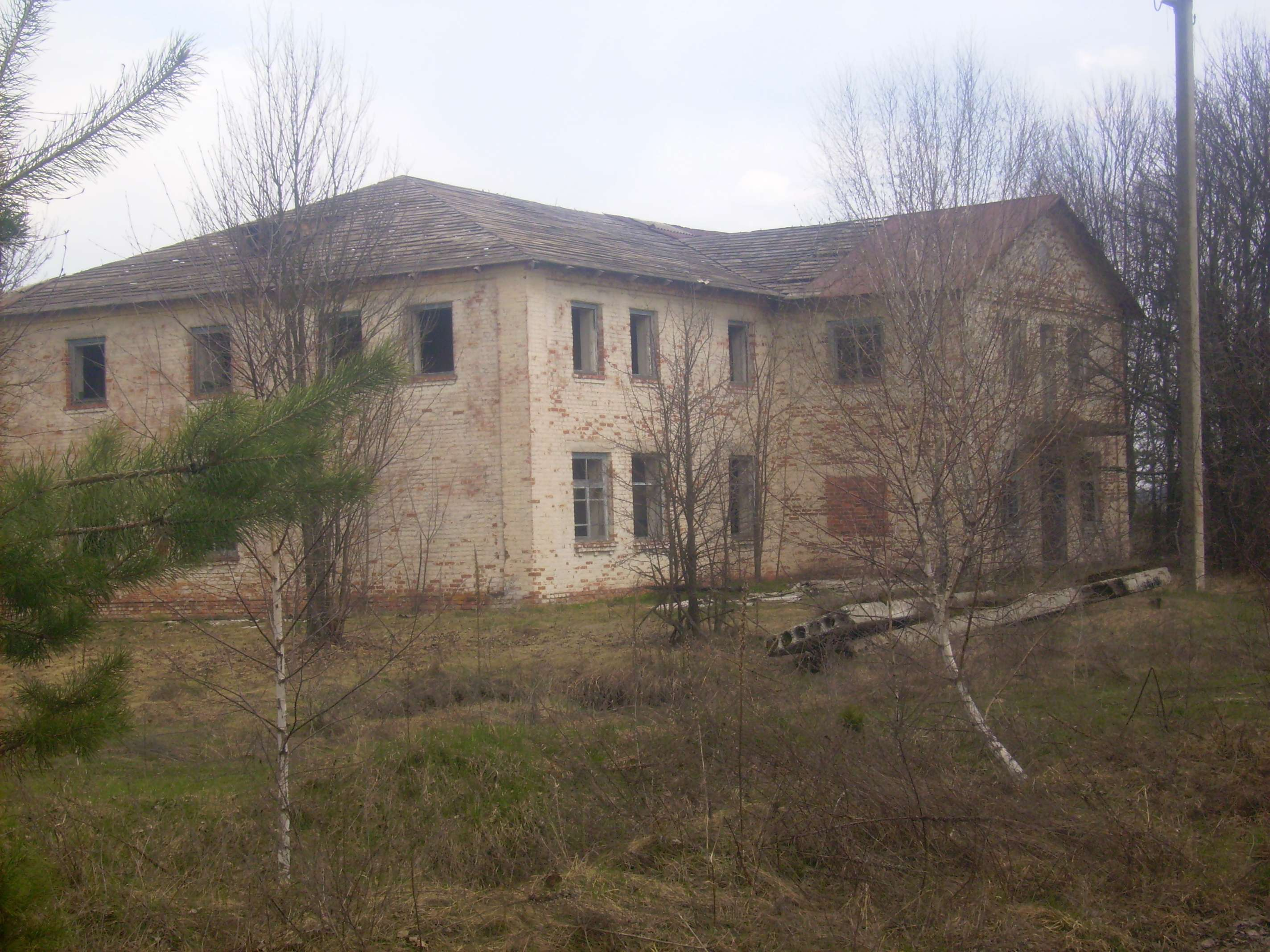
- Abandoned administrative building, 2007

- Location of Tarasy in Ukraine
- Coordinates: 51°15′50″N 29°17′16″E
- Country: Ukraine
- Oblast: Kyiv Oblast
- Raion: Poliske Raion (until 2020); Vyshhorod Raion (2020–present); Chernobyl Exclusion Zone (de facto) (1986–present)
- Founded: unknown, about 18th Century

Population
  - Total: 0
- (ca 630 in 1986)
- Area code: +380 4592

Tarasy (Ukrainian: Тараси) is an abandoned settlement and former village in the Chernobyl Exclusion Zone, in Vyshhorod Raion, Kyiv Oblast, Ukraine.

== History ==
The village was founded in the 18th century. After the nuclear disaster of 26 April 1986, it was abandoned. However, in 1999, it was taken out of a registry as it was completely depopulated being located in the Zone of Alienation. Currently nobody lives there.

Tarasy previously belonged to Poliske Raion until was abolished on 18 July 2020 as part of the administrative reform of Ukraine, which reduced the number of raions of Kyiv Oblast to seven. The area of Poliske Raion was merged into Vyshhorod Raion.

== Geography ==
The village is located along the right bank of Uzh River, 7 km from Poliske (Habne), the former district center, and 22 km from the nearest railway station, at Vilcha. Across the river Tarasy borders with the village of Stupyscha (now part of Motiyky village), Korosten Raion, Zhytomyr Oblast.

== Gallery ==
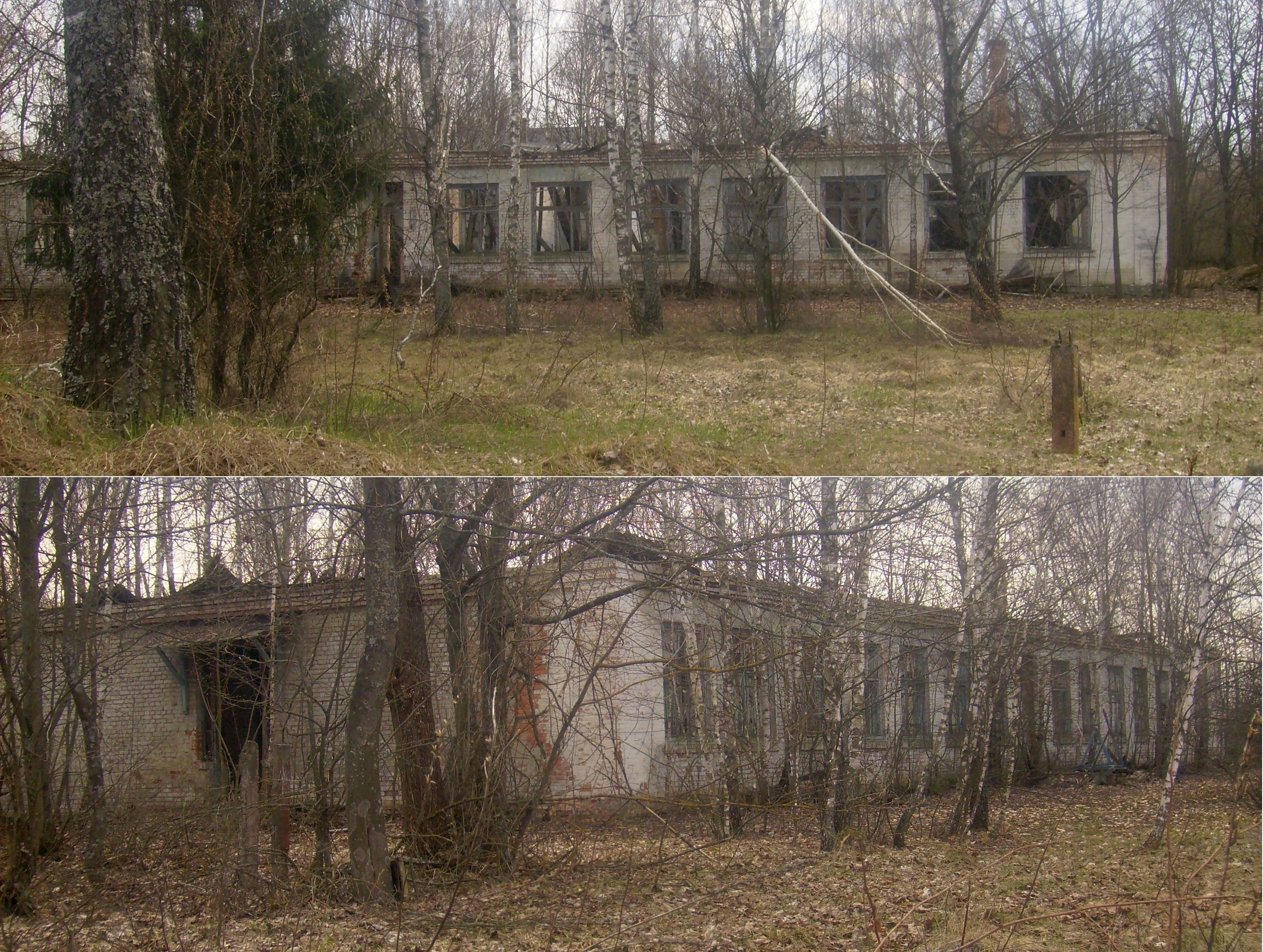
The building of the old school in the village. Photo of 2007. (51.262327°N 29.301840°E)

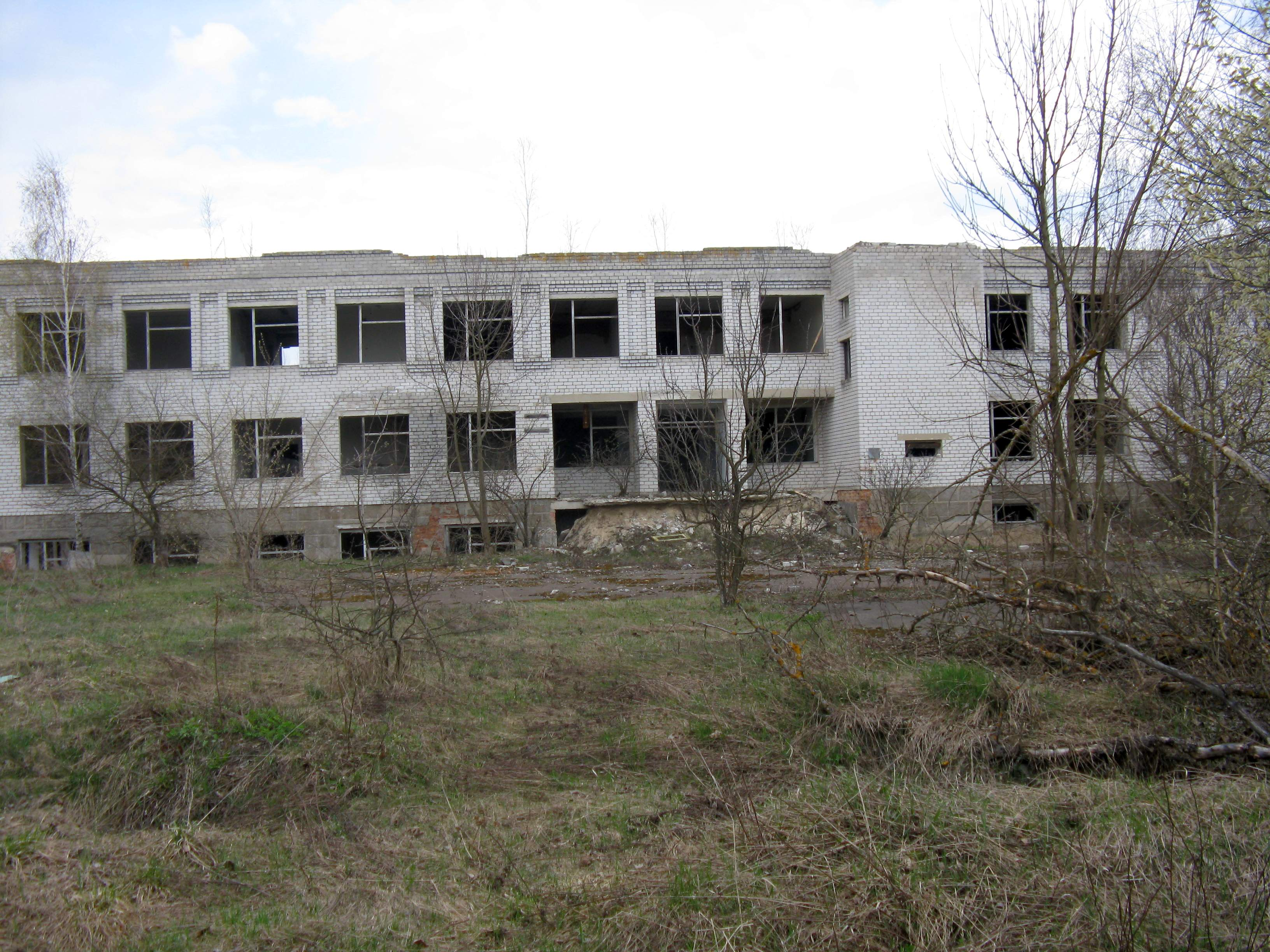
The building of the new school in the village. Photo of 2007. (51.260824°N 29.294760°E)
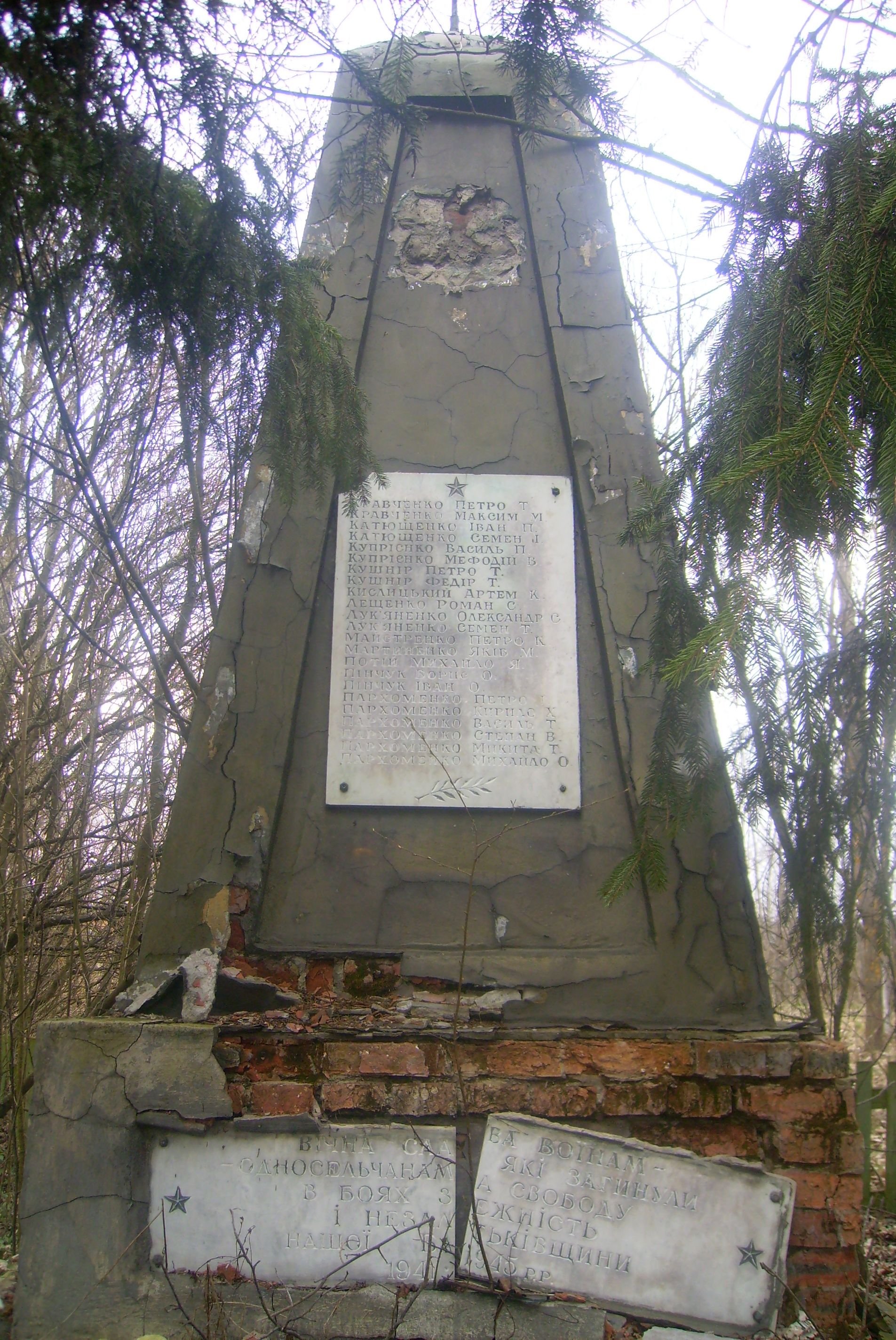
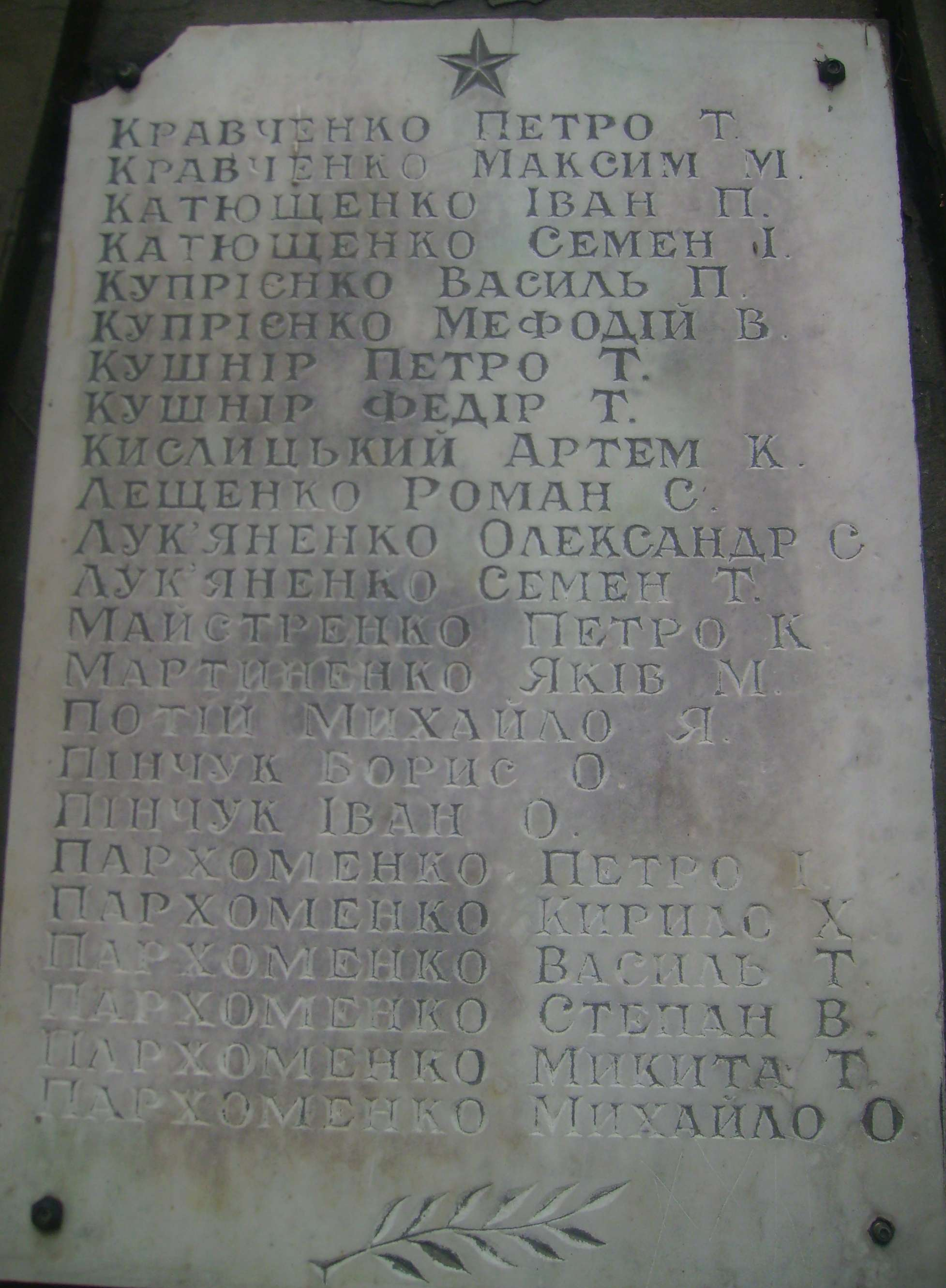
Monument to the village residents who fought and died in World War II.

== See also ==
- Chernobyl Nuclear Power Plant
