= List of cities in Kyiv Oblast =

Location of cities in Kyiv Oblast (including Slavutych), with the city of Kyiv shown in the oblast's center in a darker shade. The Chernobyl exclusion zone, located in the northern part of the oblast, is not shown.

There are 26 populated places in Kyiv Oblast, Ukraine, that have been officially granted city status (Ukrainian: місто, romanized: misto) by the Verkhovna Rada, the country's parliament. Settlements with more than 10,000 people are eligible for city status, although the status is typically also granted to settlements of historical or regional importance. As of 5 December 2001, the date of the first and only official census in the country since independence, (Note: As of 11 July 2023) the most populous city in the oblast was Bila Tserkva, with a population of 200,131 people, while the least populous city outside the Chernobyl exclusion zone was Rzhyshchiv, with 8,447 people. Although it is completely surrounded by and serves as the administrative capital of the oblast, the city of Kyiv – marked with an asterisk (*) and in bold italics in the table – is legally excluded from Kyiv Oblast and is instead given special status by the constitution of Ukraine, with the Kyiv City State Administration maintaining independence from the Kyiv Oblast State Administration. In the 2001 census, Kyiv city, which also serves as the national capital of Ukraine, had a population of 2,611,327. For their contributions to the country's defense during the Russian invasion, two cities in the oblast (Bucha and Irpin), as well as the rural settlement of Hostomel, were awarded with the honorary title Hero City of Ukraine in 2022.

From independence in 1991 to 2020, 13 cities in the oblast (including the abandoned city of Pripyat) were designated as cities of regional significance (municipalities), which had self-government under city councils, while the oblast's remaining 13 cities (including the partially abandoned city of Chernobyl) were located amongst 25 raions (districts) as cities of district significance, which are subordinated to the governments of the raions. On 18 July 2020, an administrative reform abolished and merged the oblast's raions and cities of regional significance into seven new, expanded raions. The seven raions that make up the oblast are Bila Tserkva, Boryspil, Brovary, Bucha, Fastiv, Obukhiv, and Vyshhorod. Although the Chernobyl exclusion zone is de jure part of Kyiv Oblast, it is de facto managed separately by the State Agency of Ukraine for Exclusion Zone Management subordinated to the Ministry of Energy.

== List of cities ==
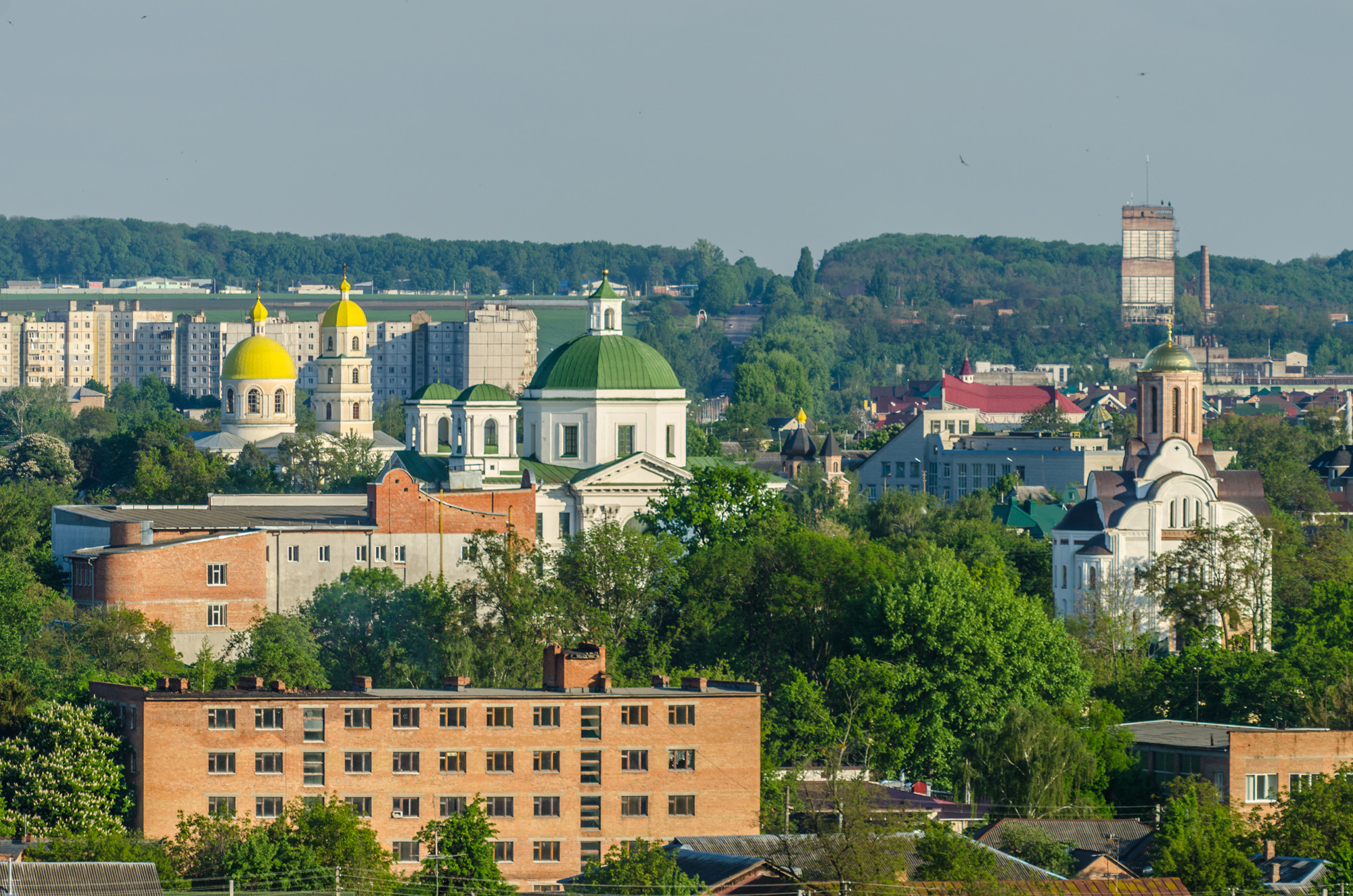
Bila Tserkva, the most populous city in Kyiv Oblast

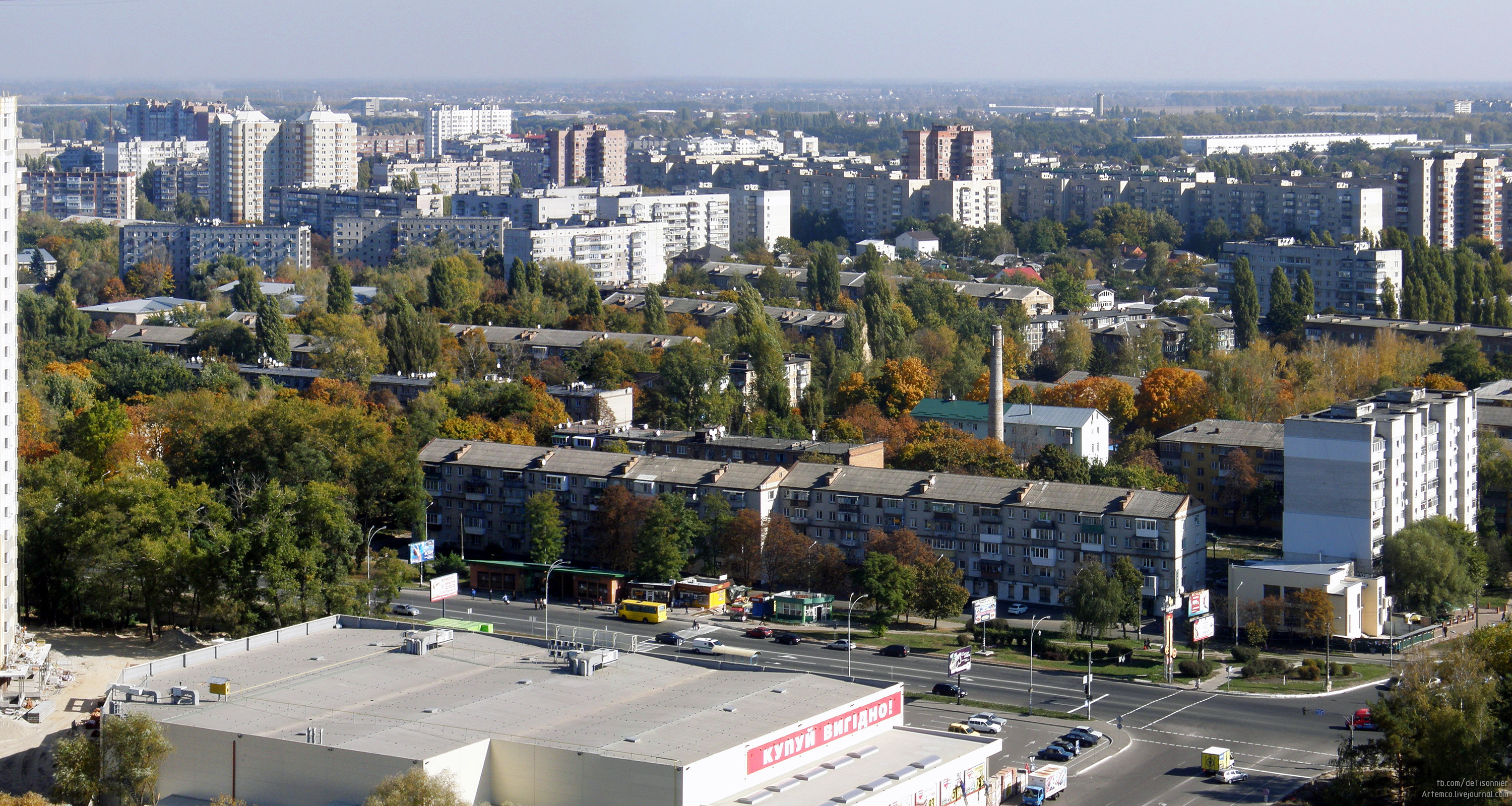
Brovary, second largest city in the oblast and the largest satellite city of Kyiv

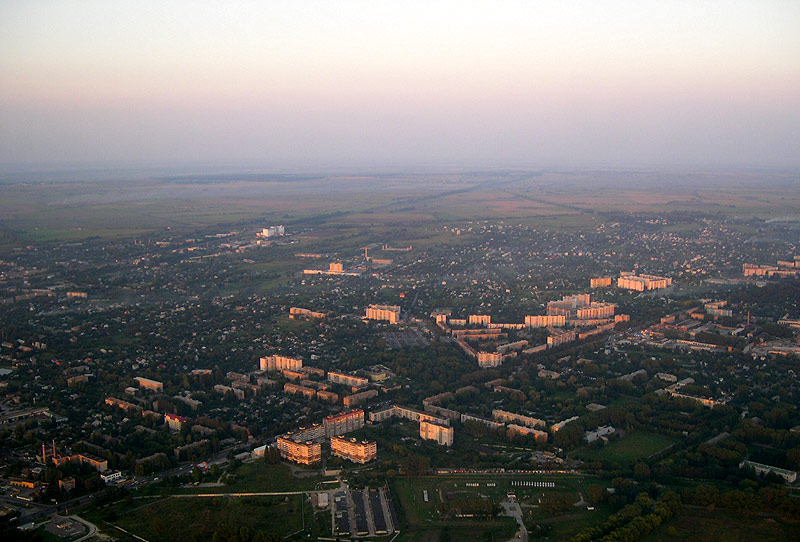
Boryspil, the oblast's fourth largest city and the site of the largest airport in Ukraine

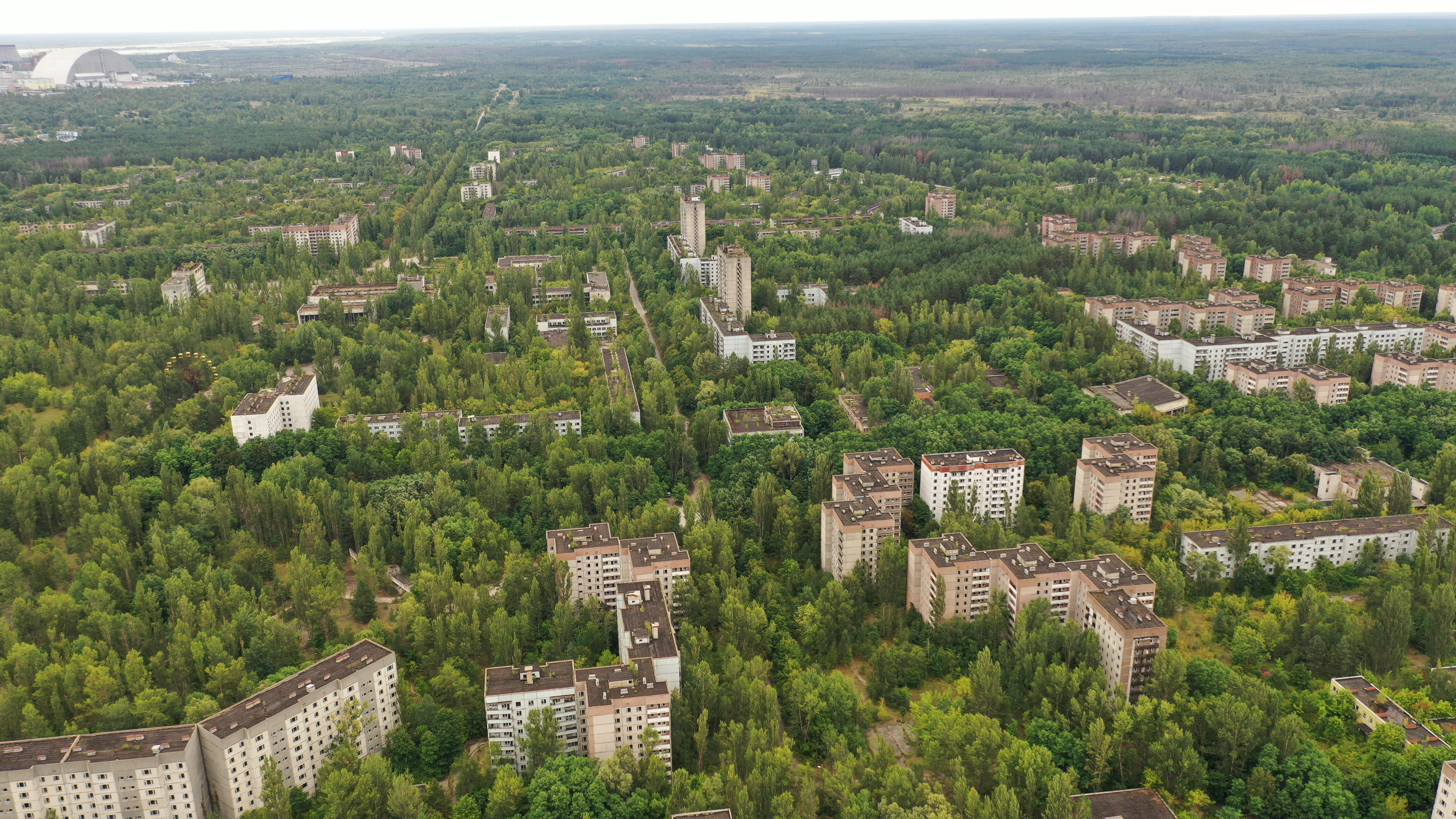
Pripyat, the country's least populous city and a ghost town as the result of its abandonment after the Chernobyl disaster

Cities in Kyiv Oblast
Name	Name (in Ukrainian) (Note: Links to the Ukrainian Wikipedia articles for each city)	Raion (district)	Population (2022 estimates)	Population (2001 census)	Population change
Berezan	Березань	Brovary	16,047	17,367	−7.60%
Bila Tserkva	Біла Церква	Bila Tserkva	207,273	200,131	+3.57%
Bohuslav	Богуслав	Obukhiv	15,789	17,135	−7.86%
Boryspil	Бориспіль	Boryspil	64,117	53,975	+18.79%
Boiarka	Боярка	Fastiv	34,394	35,968	−4.38%
Brovary	Бровари	Brovary	109,806	86,839	+26.45%
Bucha	Буча	Bucha	37,321	28,533	+30.80%
Chernobyl	Чорнобиль	Vyshhorod (Note: Administered by the Chernobyl Exclusion Zone)	1,054	0 (Note: The 2001 census was not held in the Chernobyl exclusion zone, and all populated places there, including the cities of Chernobyl and Pripyat, were marked as uninhabited. However, in reality, these areas are inhabited by samosely (a small number of residents who returned after the Chernobyl disaster), plant workers, researchers, and border guards.)	NA
Fastiv	Фастів	Fastiv	44,014	51,976	−15.32%
Irpin	Ірпінь	Bucha	65,167	40,593	+60.54%
Kaharlyk	Кагарлик	Obukhiv	13,133	13,757	−4.54%
**Kyiv***	**Київ**	**N/A (city with special status)**	**2,952,301**	**2,611,327**	**+13.06%**
Myronivka	Миронівка	Obukhiv	11,103	13,368	−16.94%
Obukhiv	Обухів	Obukhiv	33,287	32,776	+1.56%
Pereiaslav	Переяслав	Boryspil	26,273	31,634	−16.95%
Pripyat	Прип'ять	Vyshhorod	0	0	NA
Rzhyshchiv	Ржищів	Obukhiv	7,175	8,447	−15.06%
Skvyra	Сквира	Bila Tserkva	15,165	18,126	−16.34%
Slavutych	Славутич	Vyshhorod	24,464	24,402	+0.25%
Tarashcha	Тараща	Bila Tserkva	9,689	13,452	−27.97%
Tetiiv	Тетіїв	Bila Tserkva	12,640	14,944	−15.42%
Ukrainka	Українка	Obukhiv	16,081	14,163	+13.54%
Uzyn	Узин	Bila Tserkva	11,921	13,217	−9.81%
Vasylkiv	Васильків	Obukhiv	37,068	39,722	−6.68%
Vyshhorod	Вишгород	Vyshhorod	33,109	22,933	+44.37%
Vyshneve	Вишневе	Bucha	42,983	34,465	+24.71%
Yahotyn	Яготин	Boryspil	18,995	23,659	−19.71%

== See also ==
- List of cities in Ukraine
