= Bober (village) =

Bober Бобер
- Former village
- Location within Ukraine Location within Kyiv Oblast
- Coordinates: 51°09′13.3″N 29°32′01.6″E
- Country: Ukraine
- Oblast: Kyiv Oblast
- Raion: Poliske Raion (1923–2020); Vyshhorod Raion (2020–present); Chernobyl Exclusion Zone (de facto) (1990s–present)
- Established: before 1795
- Deregistered: 1999

Population (2025)
  - Total: 0
- Time zone: UTC+2 (EET)
  - Summer (DST): UTC+3 (EEST)

Bober (Ukrainian: Бобер) is an abandoned settlement and former village (selo) in Vyshhorod Raion, Kyiv Oblast, northern Ukraine. The village was evacuated in the 1990s following the aftermath of the 1986 Chernobyl disaster.

== History ==
According to 1798 parish records, Bober had 11 houses with families bearing the surnames Bobrienko, Chornoshtan, Honchar, Komar, Slobodnyak, Khmara, and Florko - a total of 91 residents.

By 1887, the population had grown to 290 people. In 1900, 433 people lived in 64 houses. The village had a synagogue and a literacy school. There was also a blacksmith shop and a factory producing soft drinks.

Before the Chernobyl disaster, the village had a butter factory, an eight-year school, two clubs, and a library. The population before the accident was approximately 1,000 people (935 in 1971). Bober was the administrative center of the Bober village council.

Due to severe radioactive contamination, the village was evacuated and its residents were relocated to the village of Seredivka in Brovary Raion. The village was officially removed from records in 1999.

Until 18 July 2020, Bober belonged to Poliske Raion. The raion was abolished that day as part of the administrative reform of Ukraine, which reduced the number of raions of Kyiv Oblast to seven. The area of Poliske Raion was merged into Vyshhorod Raion.

From February to April 2022, Bober was occupied by Russian forces as a result of the Russian invasion of Ukraine.

== Bibliography ==
- Decision on the official deregistration of the village of Bober (Рішення про офіційне зняття з обліку села Бобер)
- Information about Poliske Raion (Інформація про Поліський район)
