= Poliske =

Poliske Поліське
- Former urban-type settlement
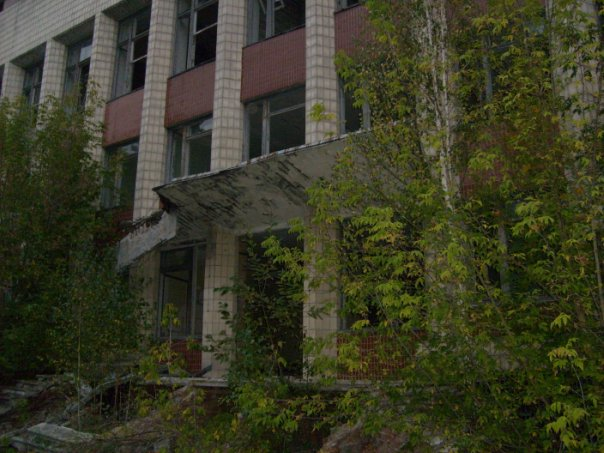
- Abandoned administrative building, 2009

- Location of Poliske in Ukraine Poliske (Ukraine)
- Coordinates: 51°14′27.27″N 29°23′13.11″E
- Country: Ukraine
- Oblast: Kyiv Oblast
- Raion: Poliske Raion (until 2020); Vyshhorod Raion (2020–present); Chernobyl Exclusion Zone (de facto) (1986–present)
- Founded: 1415
- Status elevated (urban-type settlement): 1938
- Removed from registries: 1999

Population (2013)
  - Total: 20
- (ca 12,000 in 1986)
- Area code: +380 4592

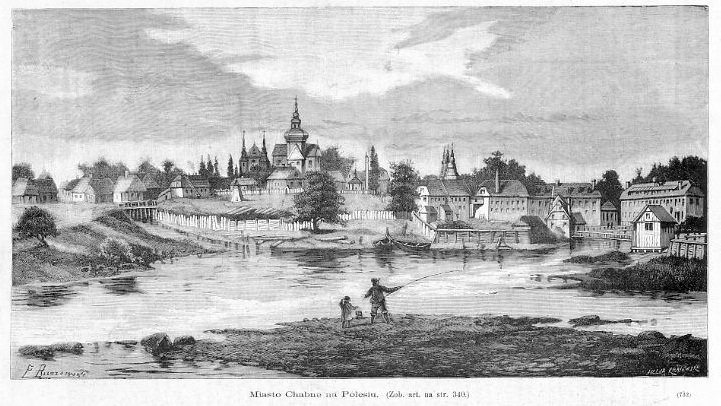
Poliske in 1885

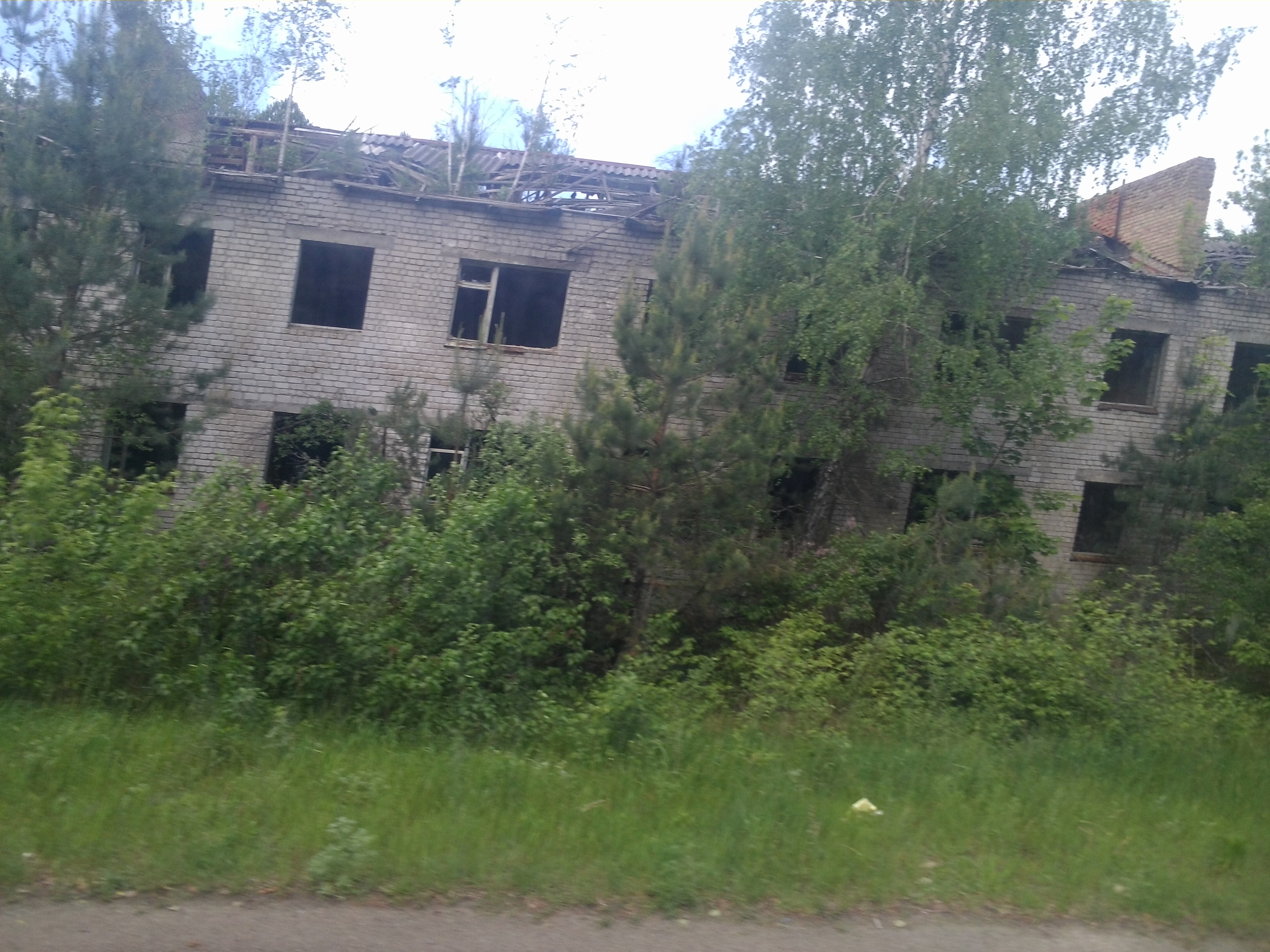
Abandoned buildings (1)

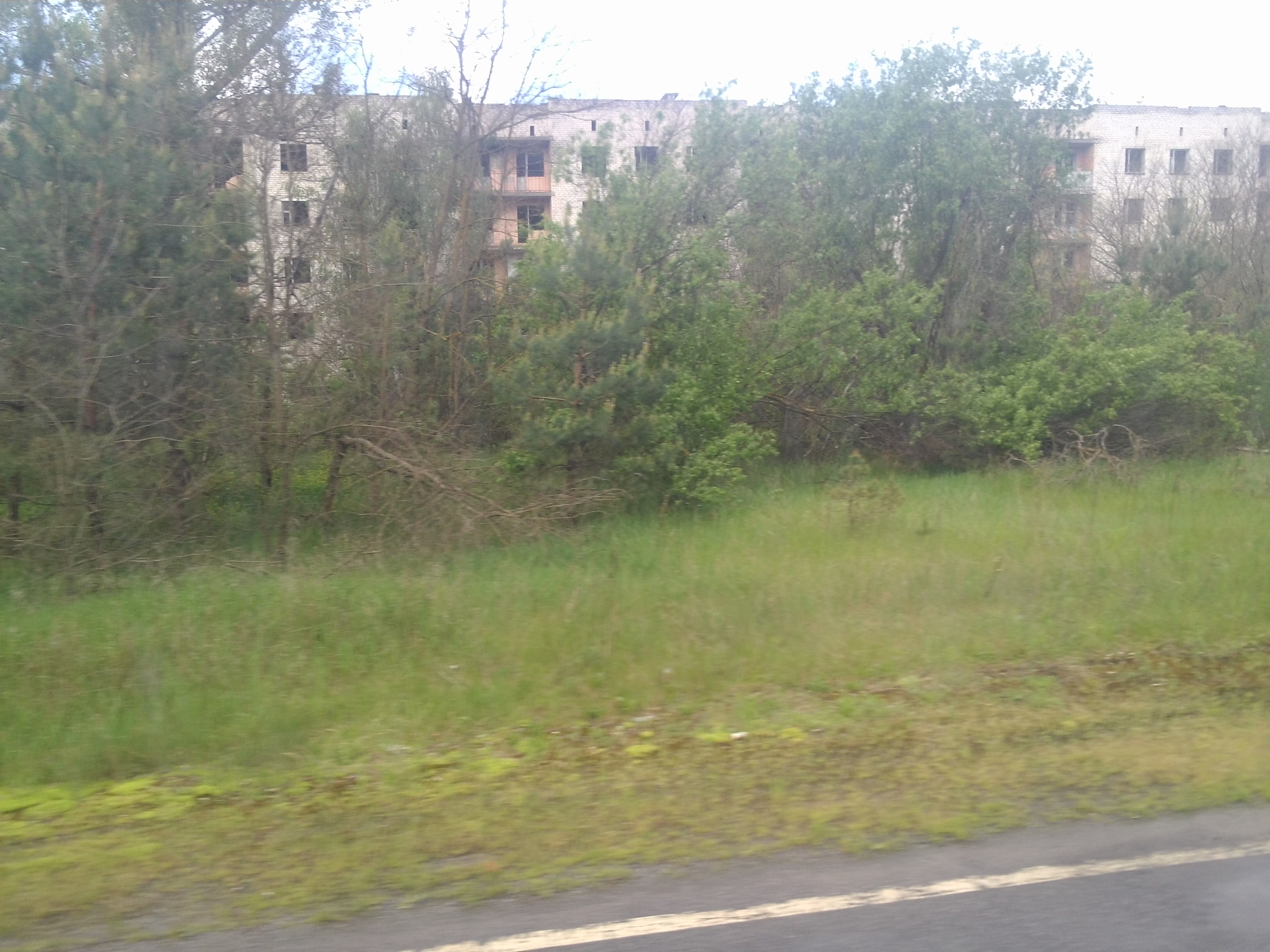
Abandoned buildings (2)

Poliske (Ukrainian: Поліське) or Polesskoye (Russian: Полесское) is an abandoned settlement and former urban-type settlement in the Chernobyl Exclusion Zone, part of Kyiv Oblast, Ukraine. It is located on the Uzh River and was the administrative center of Poliske Raion (district). However, later the town was taken out of a registry as it was completely depopulated being located in the Zone of alienation. As of 2015, around 20 people live there, so called samosely ("self-settlers").

== History ==
=== Overview ===
Originally called Khabnoye or Khabne (Russian: Хабное, Ukrainian: Хабне), it was renamed Kaganovichi Pervye or Kahanovychi Pershi (Russian: Кагановичи Первые, Ukrainian: Кагановичі Перші) in 1934, and Poliske in 1957.

Founded in the 15th century, it was the home of the Polish family Horwatt from 1850 to 1918. In the 19th century, this small city was known for its weavers and its textile industry. In 1890, 80% of the population was Jewish. In the later half of the 19th century, and in the beginning of the 20th century, there was known a klezmer band of the Makonowiecki family. Khabne lost all its major architecture during the Soviet Union – the castle of Radziwiłł, Orthodox churches, and the Catholic Church. In 1938, Khabne received official city status. After the Chernobyl disaster, Khabne's population started to fall off. In 1999, the remaining population was evacuated. In 2005, there were about 1,000 people still living there, mostly senior citizens.

From February to April 2022, Poliske was occupied by Russia as a result of the 2022 invasion.

=== Abandonment ===
Following the Chernobyl Nuclear Power Plant accident, a Zone of Alienation (Ukrainian: Зона відчуження Чорнобильської АЕС, zona vidchuzhennya Chornobyl's'koyi AES), also known as the Chernobyl Exclusion Zone, the 30 Kilometre Zone, or simply The Zone (Ukrainian: Чорнобильська зона, Chornobyl's'ka zona) was designated by the USSR military after the 1986 disaster. Initially, 30 km radius area was evacuated and placed under military control, however, over time the borders of the Zone of Alienation have increased to cover a larger area of contamination. The zone is now approximately 2,600 km^{2} (1,000 sq miles), where radioactive fallout contamination is highest. Public access and inhabitation is restricted due to radiological hazards and allow for ecological monitoring by environmental scientists.

== Geography ==
Located in the north-western corner of Kyiv Oblast, at the borders with Zhytomyr Oblast, Poliske is part of the natural region of Polesia, and is 27 km from the Belarusian border. Crossed by the regional highway P02 Ovruch-Kyiv (135 km south), the town lies between Vilcha (17 km north) and Krasiatychi (27 km south). It is 41 km far from Narodychi, 53 from Ovruch and Ivankiv, 58 from Pripyat and 65 from Chernobyl.

== Notable people ==
- Lazar Kaganovich, one of leaders of the Soviet Union, was born in the suburb of Kabany (Ukrainian: Кабани, Кабанів, Russian: Кабаны), (near Khabne) in 1893.
- Avraham-Yehoshua Makonovetsky, klezmer violinist, was born here in 1872 and was the leader of the town klezmer band from the 1890s into the Soviet era.

== In popular culture ==
- In the game S.T.A.L.K.E.R.: Shadow of Chernobyl, there is a cut location called Dead City which appears to draw inspiration from Poliske.

== See also ==
- Krasiatychi
- Chernobyl Exclusion Zone
