= Krasiatychi =

Rural locality in Kyiv Oblast, Ukraine

Krasiatychi Красятичі
- Rural settlement
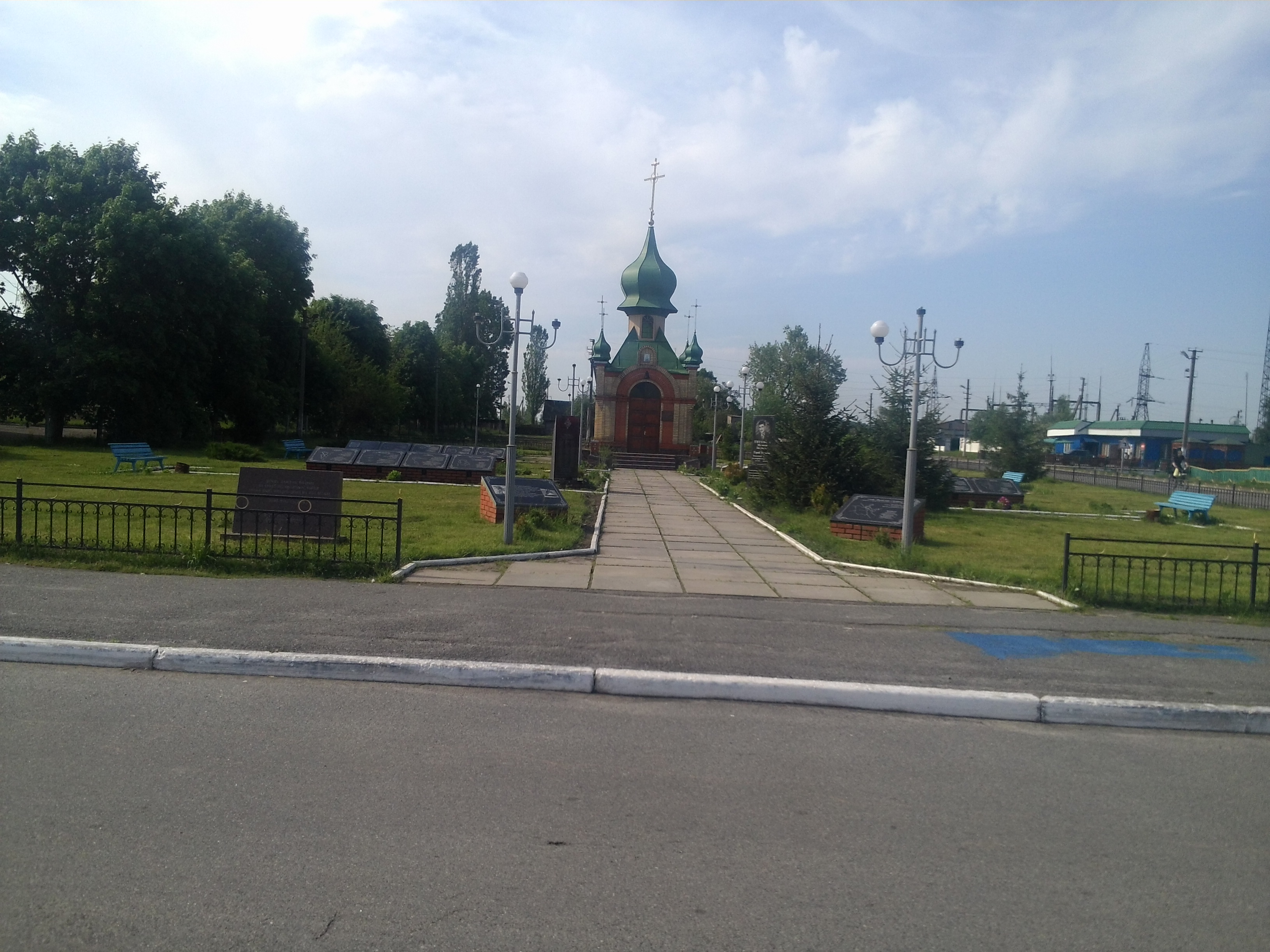
- Krasiatychi Memorial Museum

- Location of Krasiatychi in Ukraine Krasiatychi (Kyiv Oblast)
- Coordinates: 51°4′35″N 29°38′15″E
- Country: Ukraine
- Oblast: Kyiv Oblast
- Raion: Vyshhorod

Government
  - Mayor: Tetjana Iwanivna Nedaschkivska

Area
  - Total: 7 km^{2} (2.7 sq mi)
- Elevation: 151 m (495 ft)

Population (2022)
  - Total: 648
  - Density: 92/km^{2} (240/sq mi)
- Postal code: 07053
- Area code: +380 4592

Krasiatychi (Ukrainian: Красятичі, Russian: Красятичи), also spelled Krasyatychi, is a rural settlement in Vyshhorod Raion, Kyiv Oblast (province) of Ukraine. It hosts the administration of Poliske settlement hromada, one of the hromadas of Ukraine. Its population is 648 (2022 estimate).

== History ==
Until 18 July 2020, Krasiatychi served as an administrative center of Poliske Raion. The raion was abolished that day as part of the administrative reform of Ukraine, which reduced the number of raions of Kyiv Oblast to seven. The area of Poliske Raion was merged into Vyshhorod Raion.

On 25 February 2022, Russia invaded the settlement as part of the 2022 invasion of Ukraine. On 1 April 2022, Ukrainian forces regained control of Krasiatychi.

Until 26 January 2024, Krasiatychi was designated urban-type settlement. On this day, a new law entered into force which abolished this status, and Krasiatychi became a rural settlement.

== See also ==
- Poliske
- Vilcha
- Chernobyl disaster
- Chernobyl Exclusion Zone
