= Pirnove rural hromada =

Pirnove rural hromada Пірнівська селищна громада
- Hromada
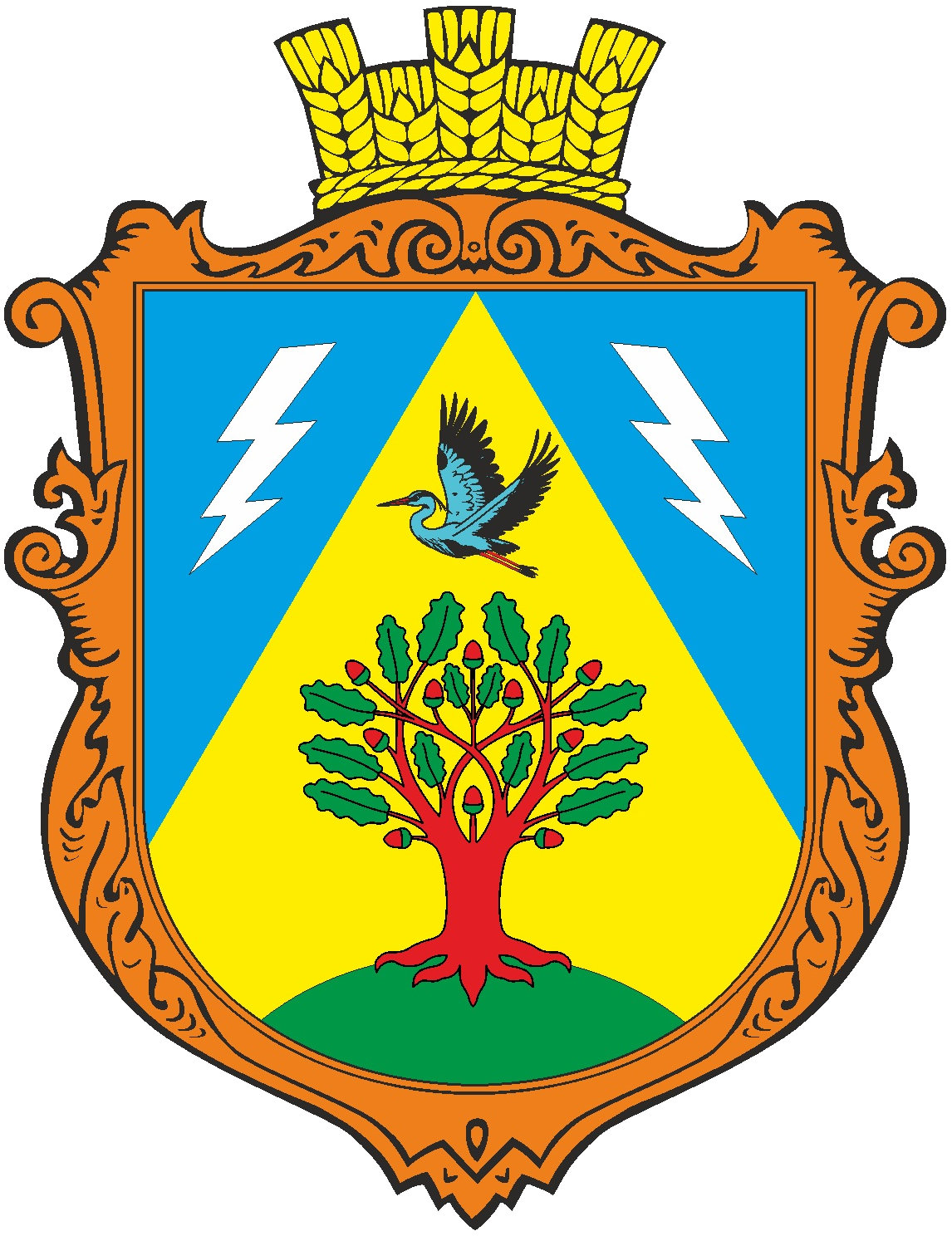
- Seal
- Interactive map of Pirnove rural hromada
- Country: Ukraine
- Oblast: Kyiv
- Raion: Vyshhorod

Area
  - Total: 727.1 km^{2} (280.7 sq mi)

Population (2020)
  - Total: 6,764
  - Density: 9.303/km^{2} (24.09/sq mi)
- Settlements: 10
- Villages: 10

Pirnove rural hromada (Ukrainian: Пірнівська селищна громада) is a hromada of Ukraine, located in Vyshhorod Raion, Kyiv Oblast. Its administrative center is the village of Pirnove.

It has an area of 727.1 square kilometres (280.7 mi^{2}) and a population of 6,764, as of 2020.

The hromada contains 10 settlements, which are all villages:

- Pirnove
- Bodenky
- Vyshcha Dubechnia
- Voropaiv
- Zhukyn
- Lebedivka
- Nyzhcha Dubechnia
- Novosilky
- Rovzhi
- Suvyd

== See also ==
- List of hromadas of Ukraine
