= Dymer settlement hromada =

Dymer settlement hromada Димерська селищна громада
- Hromada
- Interactive map of Dymer settlement hromada
- Country: Ukraine
- Oblast: Kyiv Oblast
- Raion: Vyshhorod Raion

Area
  - Total: 956.0 km^{2} (369.1 sq mi)

Population (2020)
  - Total: 21,042
  - Density: 22.01/km^{2} (57.01/sq mi)
- Settlements: 34
- Villages: 33
- Towns: 1

Dymer settlement hromada (Ukrainian: Димерська селищна громада) is a hromada of Ukraine, located in Vyshhorod Raion, Kyiv Oblast. Its administrative center is the town of Dymer.

It has an area of 956.0 square kilometres (369.1 mi^{2}) and a population of 21,042, as of 2020.

The hromada includes 34 populated places: 1 settlement (Dymer), and 33 villages:

- Abramivka
- Andriivka
- Bohdany
- Vakhivka
- Volodymyrivka
- Hlibivka
- Huta-Katiuzhanska
- Demydiv
- Dmytrivka
- Dudky
- Kamenka
- Katiuzhanka
- Kozarovychi
- Kruhy
- Lytvynivka
- Lisovychi
- Liubydva
- Liubymivka
- Mykolaivka
- Ovdiieva Nyva
- Pyliava
- Rykun
- Rytni
- Rykhta
- Rovy
- Roztisne
- Rudnia-Dymerska
- Savenky
- Sychivka
- Sukholuchchia
- Tolokun
- Fedorivka
- Yasnohorodka

== See also ==
- List of hromadas of Ukraine
