= Dymer, Kyiv Oblast =

Rural locality in Kyiv Oblast, Ukraine

Dymer Димер
- Rural settlement
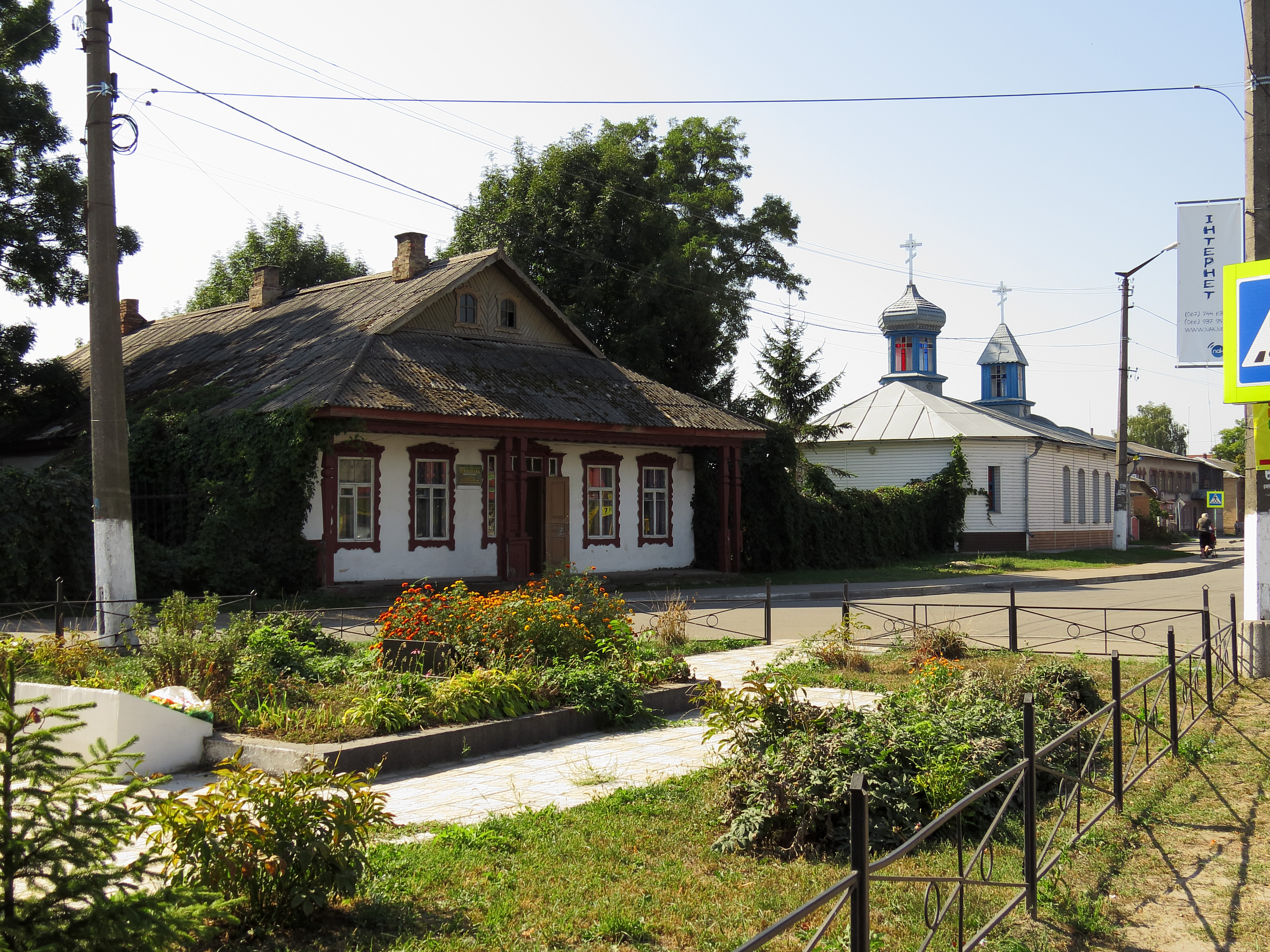
- Library and church

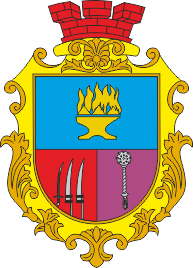
- Coat of arms

- Location within Kyiv Oblast Location within Ukraine
- Coordinates: 50°47′01″N 30°18′29″E
- Country: Ukraine
- Oblast: Kyiv Oblast
- Raion: Vyshhorod Raion
- Hromada: Dymer settlement hromada
- Founded: 1582

Population (2001)
  - Total: 5,817
- Postal code: 07330
- Area code: +380 4496

Dymer (Ukrainian: Димер, Ukrainian pronunciation: [ˈdɪmer]; Russian: Дымер) is a rural settlement in Vyshhorod Raion of Kyiv Oblast (province) of Ukraine with a population of 5,592 (2022 estimate) It hosts the administration of Dymer settlement hromada, one of the hromadas of Ukraine.

== Geography ==
Dymer is located on the Irpin river, 12 km from its confluence with the Dnieper.

== History ==
The village of Dymer was founded in 1582. After the War of Liberation, Dymer returned to Polish rule and became the seat of Hetman Ostap Hohol’s registered Cossacks in 1667. Dymer became part of the Russian Empire in 1793 following the Second Partition of Poland.

During the Russian Civil War, Dymer’s Jewish community endured repeated pogroms. A Jewish self-defense force formed in 1917 and prevented an attempted pogrom in January 1918. In 1919, Volunteer Army troops carried out a pogrom in which more than 40 women were raped, followed by another attack by Struk’s Cossack detachment in November.

During Soviet times Dymer served as a district centre of Kyiv Oblast.

During WWII Dymer was occupied on August 25, 1941. Within days, 18 Jews were taken to Kyiv and shot, while more than 70 local residents, including Jews, were murdered near the hospital. Other Jews were taken to Babyn Yar. On November 7, Sonderkommando 4a killed about 120 remaining Jews near an unfinished airfield. In 1942, several non-Jewish wives of Jews and children from mixed marriages were also shot. The Red Army liberated Dymer on November 4, 1943.

Clashes occurred here during the 2022 Russian invasion of Ukraine, when Ukrainian airborne assault troops engaged Russian soldiers at Ivankiv and Dymer.

Until 26 January 2024, Dymer was designated urban-type settlement. On this day, a new law entered into force which abolished this status, and Dymer became a rural settlement.

== Economy ==
Dymer is a centre of forest industry.
