= Peter Andreychuk =

Ukrainian Catholic martyr (1892–1937)

Peter Philippovich Andreychuk (Ukrainian: Petro Andrіychuk, 9 August 1892, Kiev Governorate – 5 November 1937) was a Catholic layman, and a victim of religious persecution.

== Biography ==
He was born on August 9, 1892, at a farm in Vyshhorod Raion, Kiev Governorate, Russian Empire of Orthodox religion by birth. In 1920, he married a Catholic woman, shortly before the marriage he accepted Catholicism. He lived in Stavishche village, worked as a foreman shoe shop and was an active parishioner of the Catholic Church of the Holy Trinity. Rector of the parish, Father Albin Gutowski, often put his piety as an example to others. On 11 October 1937, Andreychuk was arrested for a gang case of Catholics, and on 26 October of the same year sentenced under articles 54-6, 54-9, 54-11 of the Criminal Code of the Ukrainian SSR to capital punishment. He was shot on November 5, 1937.
