= Avraham-Yehoshua Makonovetsky =

Russian klezmer violinist

Avraham-Yehoshua Makonovetsky (Yiddish: אברהם-יהושע מאקאָנאָװעצקי, Russian: Авраам-Егошуа Маконовичский, born 1872) was a Russian-Jewish Klezmer violinist who acted as a key informant to the Soviet Ethnomusicologist Moisei Beregovsky in the 1930s. His extensive handwritten manuscripts, which are now in the collection of the Vernadsky National Library of Ukraine, serve as a rare example of nineteenth-century Klezmer violin music.

== Biography ==
Makonovetsky was born in Khabne, Kiev Governorate, Russian Empire in 1872. (The town was renamed Poliske in 1957 and is now depopulated due to being located in the Chernobyl Exclusion Zone of Ukraine.) Makonovetsky's father, known as Yisroel der fidler (Israel the fiddler) had lived in Bragin (now Brahin, Belarus) before marrying a woman from Khabne and relocating there, forming a klezmer ensemble there in 1858. In Khabne he worked not only as a klezmer but also as a barber, watchmaker, glazier, and music teacher to local poor children. Makonovetsky began to study the violin under his father at age seven, and his father later sent him to study under another violinist, Arn-Moyshe Sirtovich, in Malyn. After a few years of being underpaid and underfed as the second fiddler in Sirtovich's orchestra, Makonovetsky left Malyn for Radomyshl where he joined another klezmer ensemble under Nune Vaynshteyn. In 1893 he returned to Khabne where he continued to work as a klezmer, and he soon became the leader of the local ensemble. The band served not only Khabne but also smaller towns within a fifty kilometre radius which had no klezmer bands of their own.

In Khabne in the 1890s he sought to improve his musical education, studying printed works by Charles Auguste de Bériot and a method book by a Polish author named Niedzielski, as well as other published concertos and etudes. He then set out to document klezmer material and compositions from other towns such as Makariv, Radomyshl, and Bila Tserkva.

Makonovetsky spent the rest of his life in Khabne, apparently still working as a klezmer musician into the early Soviet era. His exact place and date of death are unknown, although he was certainly alive in the late 1930s when he corresponded with Beregovski.

== Legacy ==
Makonovetsky is known today because he acted as a key informant to Moisei Beregovsky, the Soviet Jewish ethnomusicologist and klezmer researcher. He answered Beregovsky's questionnaire about how the klezmer trade worked in the late nineteenth century and shared his extensive manuscripts of klezmer repertoire, some of which Beregovsky used in his published volume of Jewish Instrumental Folk Music. After the closure of the Institute of Jewish Proletarian Culture in Kyiv in 1949, Beregovsky's materials (including Makonovetsky's manuscripts) were kept in storage for several decades before being integrated into the collection of the Vernadsky National Library of Ukraine after the breakup of the Soviet Union. At present, his manuscripts have been digitized and are accessible as part of a digitization project by the Klezmer Institute called the Kiselgof-Makonovetsky Digital Manuscript Project (KMDMP).
