= Vilcha, Kyiv Oblast =

Vilcha Вільча
- Former urban-type settlement
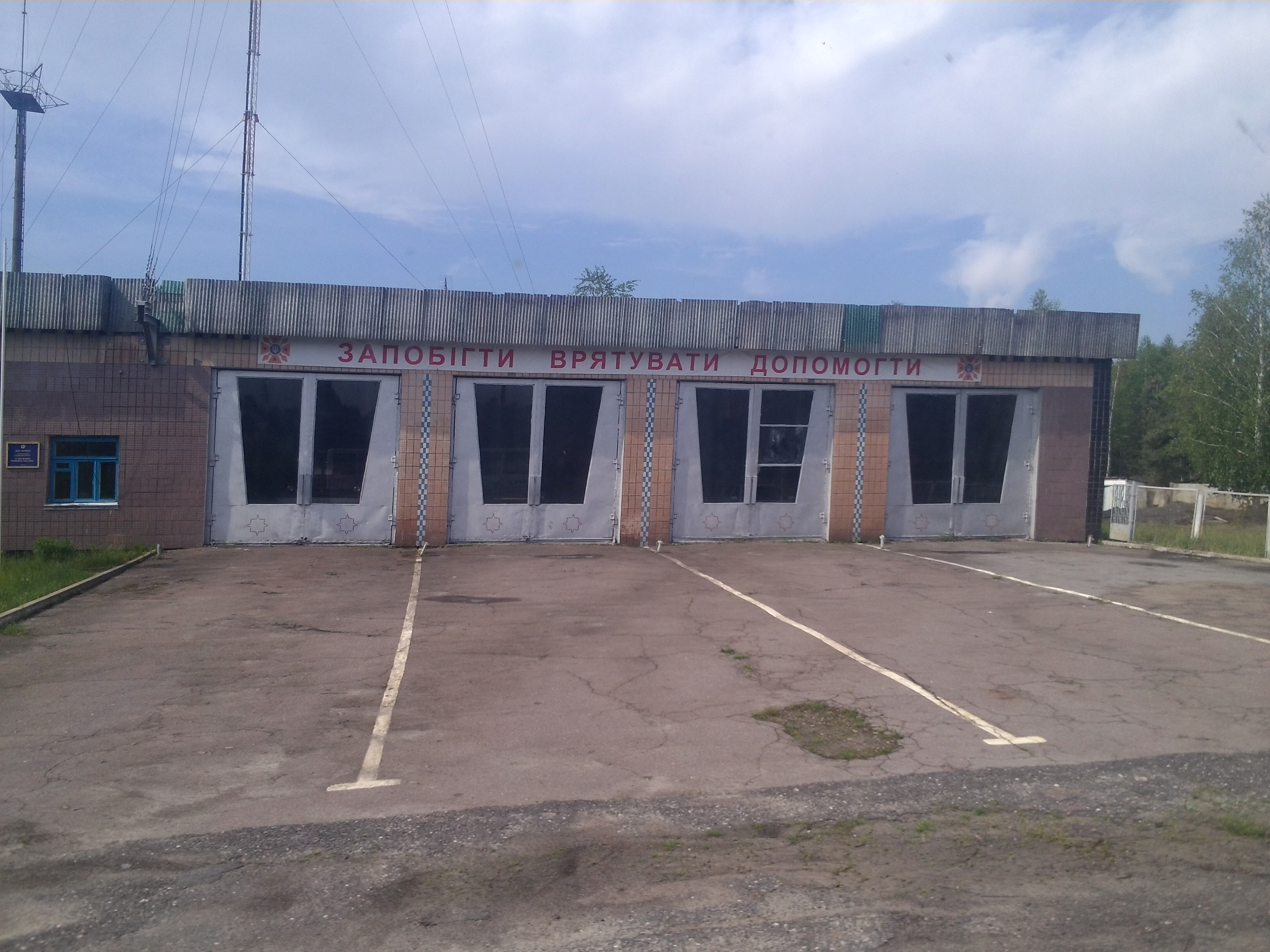
- Vilcha Fire Station

- Location of Vilcha in Ukraine Vilcha (Ukraine)
- Coordinates: 51°21′35″N 29°25′53″E
- Country: Ukraine
- Oblast: Kyiv Oblast
- Raion: Poliske Raion (until 2020); Vyshhorod Raion (2020–present); Chernobyl Exclusion Zone (de facto) (1986–present)
- Founded: 1926
- Elevation: 151 m (495 ft)

Population (2012)
  - Total: 3
- (2,200 in 1981)
- Postal code: 07011
- Area code: +380 4592

Vilcha (Ukrainian: Вільча; Russian: Вильча) is an abandoned settlement and former urban-type settlement in the Chernobyl Exclusion Zone, part of Vyshhorod Raion, Kyiv Oblast, Ukraine.

== History ==
The settlement was founded in 1926 on the site of a settlement named Oleksiivka (Ukrainian: Олексіївка). After the 1986 accident at the Chernobyl Nuclear Power Plant, 45 km far from Vilcha, the settlement was not included into the "Exclusion Zone" before 1993. During 1993 to 1996, most of the 2,000 residents moved to Kharkiv Oblast, where they founded a new Vilcha (709 km away), a few kilometres south of the town of Vovchansk.

The ghost town, today one of the checkpoints to the Exclusion Zone, was resettled by a few samosely some years later.

On February 24, 2022, the State Border Service of Ukraine claimed to be battling a column of Russian military vehicles at the border crossing with Belarus, near Vilcha. From February to April 2022, Vilcha was occupied by Russia as a result of the 2022 invasion.

== Geography ==
Located near the borders with Zhytomyr Oblast and the Belarusian Oblast of Gomel, Vilcha is located in the middle of the natural region of Polesia, close to its radioecological reserve. It is 17 km from Poliske, 40 km from Krasiatychi (the raion's administrative seat), 43 km from Pripyat, 44 km from Ovruch and 95 km from Slavutych.

== Transport ==
The settlement is crossed in the middle by the regional highway P02 Ovruch-Kyiv (150 km south), and is the southern end of the T1035 road from Oleksandrivka, Naroulia District, in Belarus, that continues as P37 highway to Naroulia and Mazyr (95 km north). It also has a railway station, officially in service but without passenger traffic, on the Chernihiv–Ovruch line.

== Gallery ==
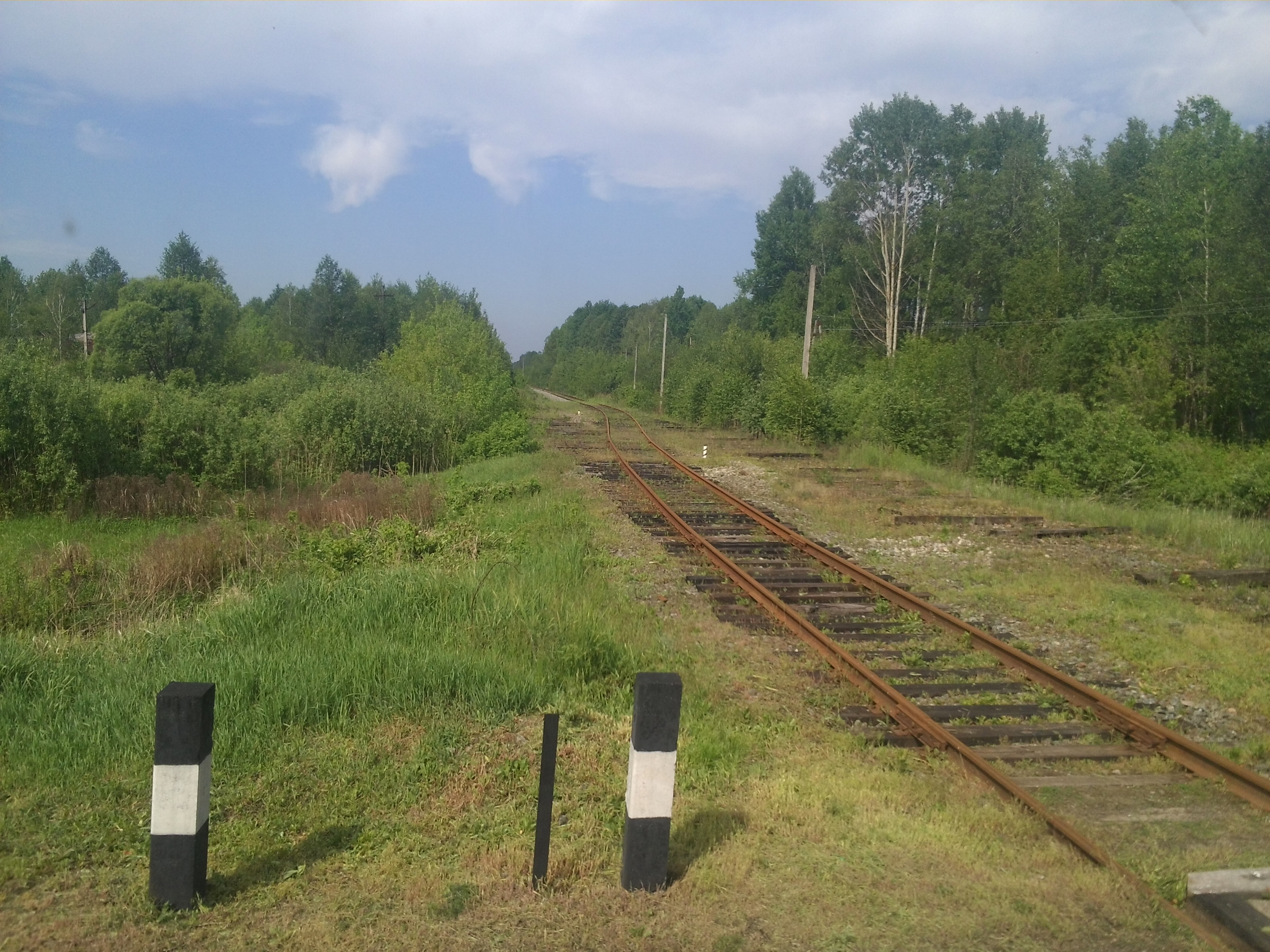
A rail track nearby Vilcha station

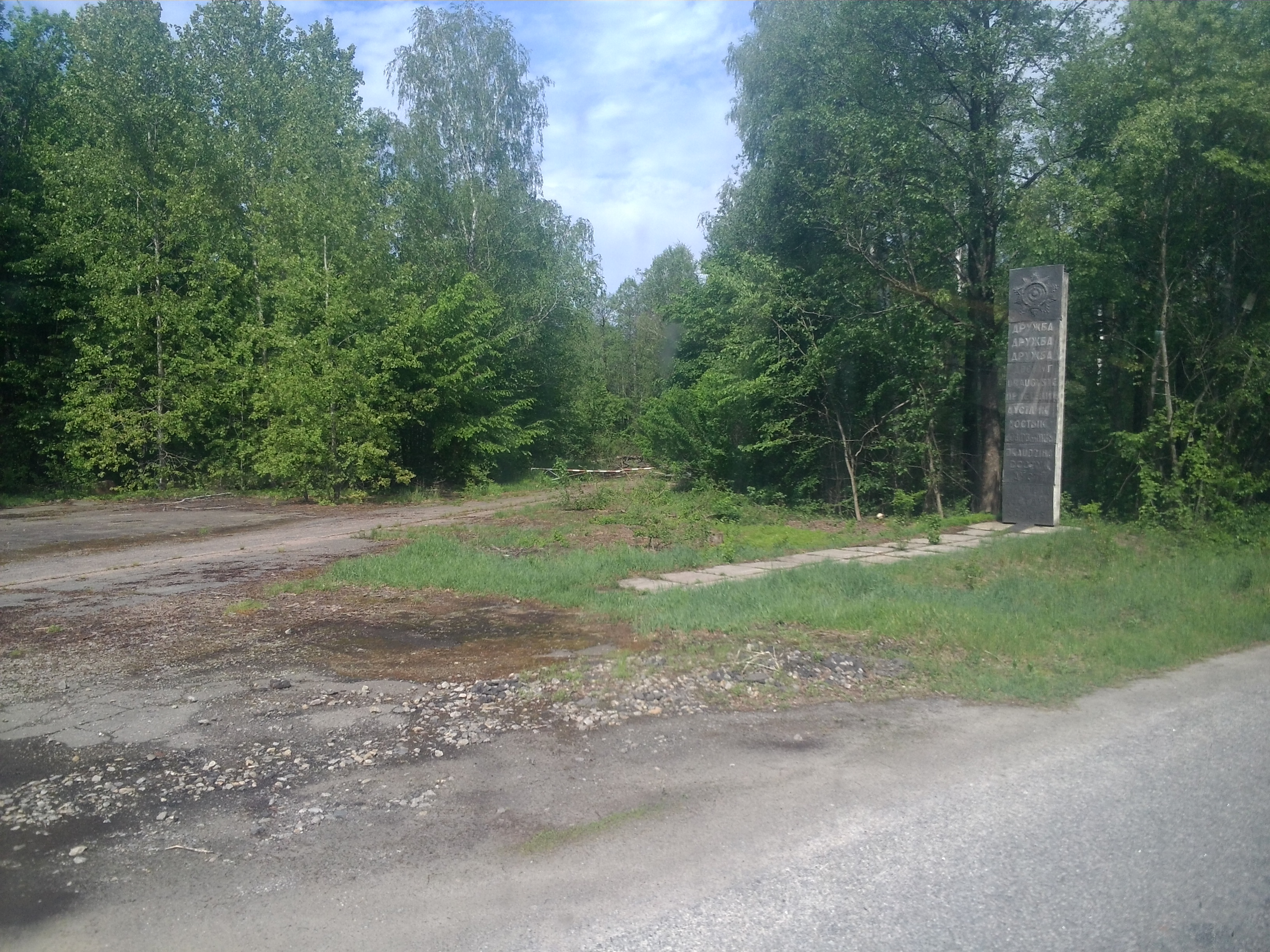
Old friendship monument at the old Belarusian border (current Ukrainian Side)

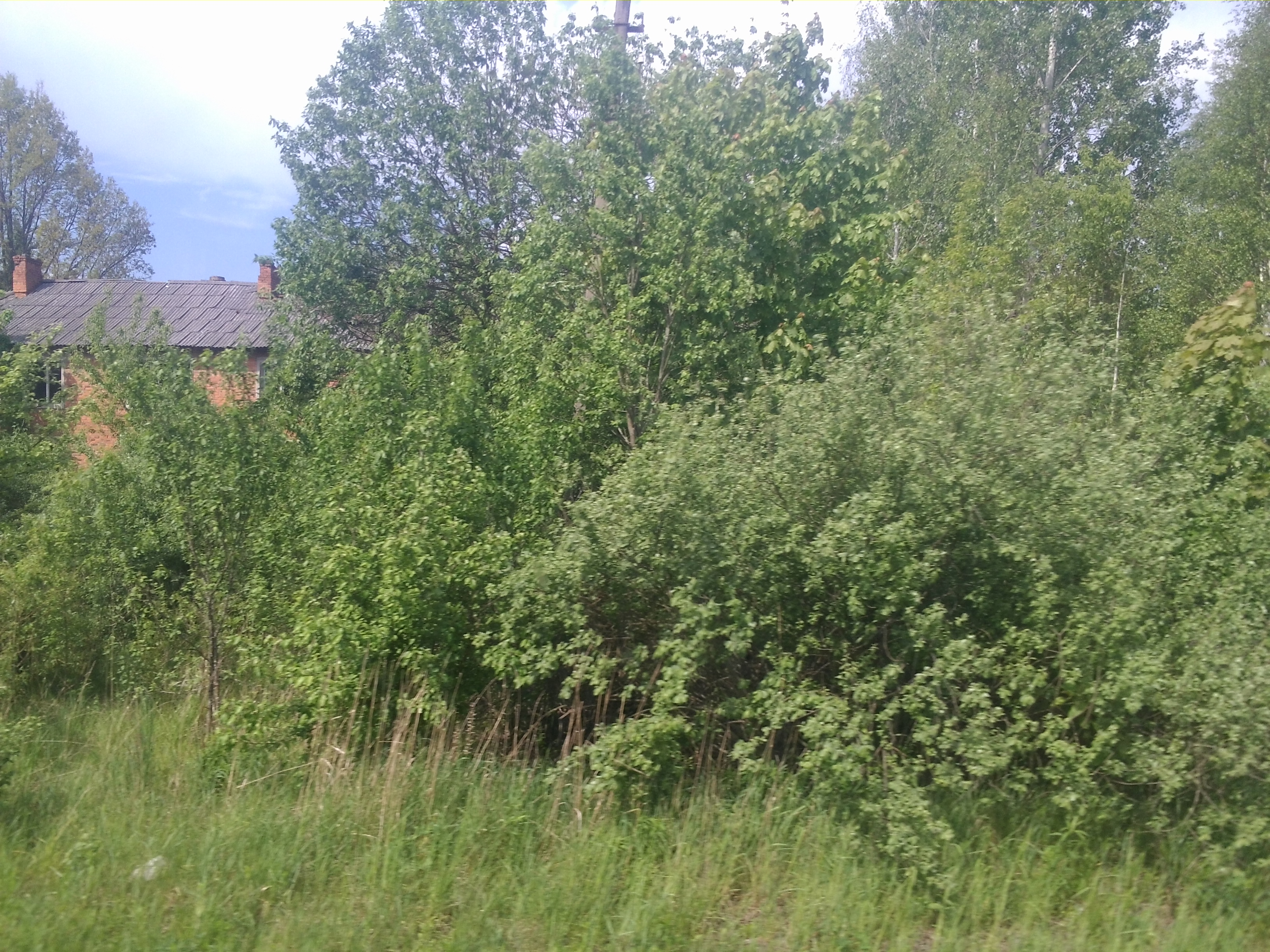
An abandoned house, hidden by vegetation

== See also ==
- Vilcha, Kharkiv Oblast
- Chernobyl Exclusion Zone
