= Poliske Raion =

Former subdivision of Kyiv Oblast, Ukraine

Poliske Raion Поліський район
- Raion
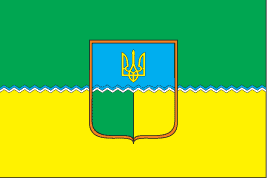
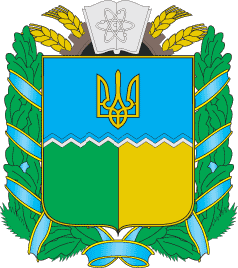
- Flag Coat of arms
- Interactive map of Poliske Raion
- Coordinates: 51°15′24″N 29°35′41″E
- Country: Ukraine
- Region: Kyiv Oblast
- Disestablished: 18 July 2020
- Admin. center: Krasiatychi
- Subdivisions: List: — city councils; — settlement councils; — rural councils; Number of localities: — cities; — urban-type settlements; 30 — villages; — rural settlements

Population (2020)
  - Total: 5,456
- Time zone: UTC+02:00 (EET)
  - Summer (DST): UTC+03:00 (EEST)
- Area code: +380

Poliske Raion (Ukrainian: Поліський район) was a raion (district) of Kyiv Oblast in Ukraine. Its administrative center was the urban-type settlement of Krasiatychi. The raion was abolished on 18 July 2020 as part of the administrative reform of Ukraine, which reduced the number of raions of Kyiv Oblast to seven. The area of Poliske Raion was merged into Vyshhorod Raion. The last estimate of the raion population was 5,456 (2020 est.).

At the time of disestablishment, the raion consisted of one hromada, Poliske settlement hromada with the administration in Krasiatychi.

== See also ==
- Poliske
- Vilcha
- Chernobyl Exclusion Zone
