= Poliske settlement hromada =

Poliske settlement hromada Поліська селищна громада
- Hromada
- Interactive map of Poliske settlement hromada
- Country: Ukraine
- Oblast: Kyiv Oblast
- Raion: Vyshhorod Raion

Area
  - Total: 563.8 km^{2} (217.7 sq mi)

Population (2020)
  - Total: 5,391
  - Density: 9.562/km^{2} (24.77/sq mi)
- Settlements: 30
- Rural settlements: 1
- Villages: 29

Poliske settlement hromada (Ukrainian: Поліська селищна громада) is a hromada of Ukraine, located in Vyshhorod Raion, Kyiv Oblast. Its administrative centre is the rural settlement of Krasiatychi.

It has an area of 563.8 square kilometres (217.7 mi^{2}) and a population of 5,391, as of 2020.

== Composition ==
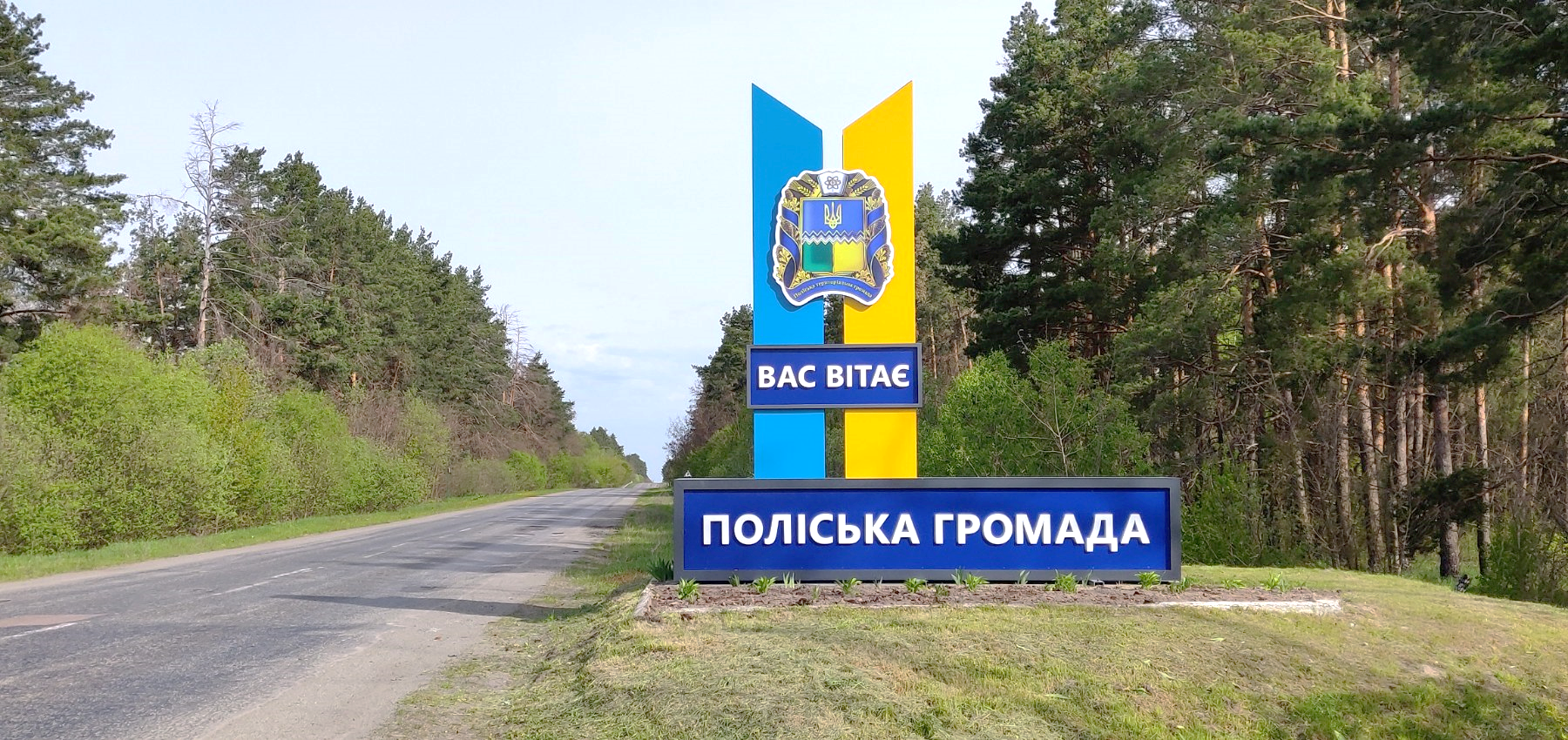
Road sign on the entry to Poliske settlement hromada

The hromada comprises thirty settlements: one rural settlement (Krasiatychi) and one village (Lisove) are directly subordinated to it; the remaining twenty-eight villages are each subordinated to one of ten numbered starosta okruhs (elderships) thus (administrative centres are emboldened):

- Starosta okruh № 1
  - Dubova
  - Dubova
  - Horodeshchyna
  - Levkovychi
  - Mikhlivshchyna
- Starosta okruh № 2
  - Cheremoshna
  - Kalynivka
  - Nivetske
  - Romanivka
  - Steshchyna
- Starosta okruh № 3
  - Buda-Radynska
  - Fedorivka
  - Omelianivka
  - Radynka
- Starosta okruh № 4
  - Maksymovychi
- Starosta okruh № 5
  - Mlachivka
- Starosta okruh № 6
  - Marianivka
  - Zelena Poliana
- Starosta okruh № 7
  - Luhovyky
  - Zirka
- Starosta okruh № 8
  - Rahivka
- Starosta okruh № 9
  - Buda Vovchkivska
  - Shkneva
  - Stara Markivka
  - Stovpne
  - Vovchkiv
- Starosta okruh № 10
  - Veresnia
  - Zalyshany

== See also ==
- List of hromadas of Ukraine
