= Samosely =

Residents of the Chernobyl Exclusion Zone

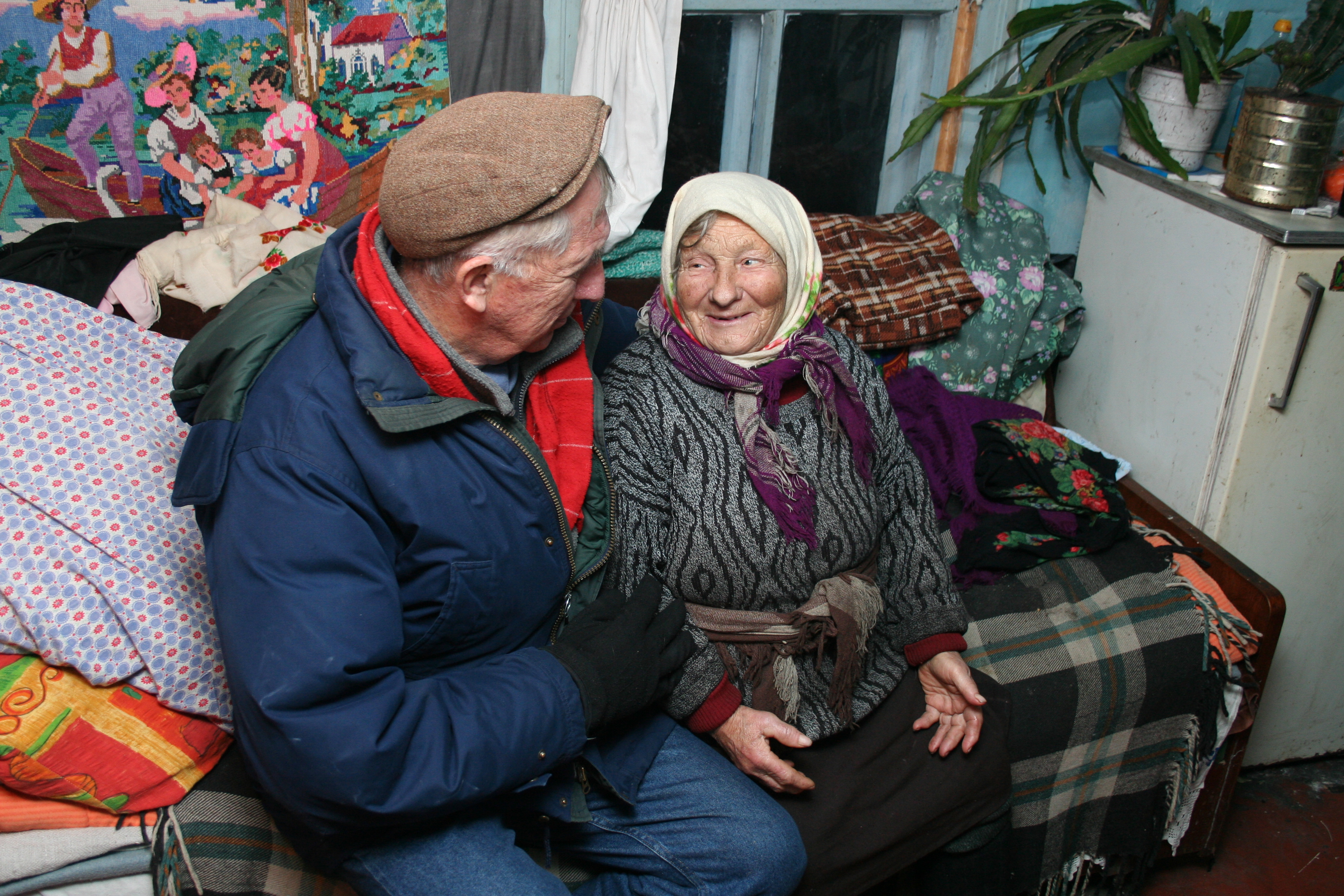
Two samosely in 2007

Samosely (Ukrainian: самосели; Russian: самосёлы; Belarusian: самасёлы, lit. 'self-settlers') are residents of the 30-kilometer Chernobyl Exclusion Zone surrounding the most heavily contaminated areas near the Chernobyl Nuclear Power Plant in Belarus and Ukraine. In Belarusian, Ukrainian, and Russian the semosel (Note: Ukrainian: самосел, samosel; Russian: самосёл, samosel, samosyol; Belarusian: самасёл, samasyol) is a generic reference to these who settle without an official approval or permission.

The zone contains a number of abandoned towns and villages whose current population is made up of people who either refused to evacuate the area or secretly resettled in the relatively unprotected region after it was cordoned off. The majority of the samosely are elderly people who made their home in the area prior to the 1986 Chernobyl disaster, although some are disaffected settlers from outside the region. When the population was evacuated, they were initially told they could return in a few days, and many faced discrimination in areas of government resettlement. Originally there were 1,200 people who returned into the area in 1986 after evacuation. As of 2007, there were 314 samosely remaining (out of the 100,000 previous inhabitants of the area that have been evacuated), according to the last official samosely census. In 2017, there were only 135 samosely left. Most are concentrated in the town of Chernobyl itself, with about half the population dispersed in 11 other villages throughout the zone. The average age of the samosely is 63. The main reason for the decline of the samosely population is their advanced age.

== Population ==
In Ukraine, the population was estimated at 197 in 2012, down from 328 in 2007 and 612 in 1999. During the past 25 years, there were more than 900 deaths and just one birth in the Chernobyl Exclusion Zone. The only known birth occurred on 25 August 1999, when 46-year-old Lydia Sovenko gave birth to a healthy girl. Both Lydia and her husband, Mikhailo Bedernikov had returned to Chernobyl a few months earlier. The child, Maria Sovenko lived in Chernobyl until 2006. She moved to a village outside the Exclusion Zone, where she attended boarding school. Maria returned to Chernobyl only on weekends, to meet her mother who still lived there.

The average age of a samosel was 63 in 2007. In 2012, the local administration unofficially granted permission to the elderly samosel to live in the area, but ordered all the younger inhabitants to move out. The total population in 2009 was reported to be 271. By 2016, the total population had fallen to about 180, most of them women.

Settlement	Pop. (2000s)	Pop. (1986)	Ukrainian
Chernobyl (city)	1,054	13,700	Чорнобиль
Pripyat (city)	1,000	49,360	Прип'ять
Illintsi	37	1,059	Іллінці
Teremtsi	36	463	Теремці
Kupuvate	32	324	Купувате
Opachychi	20	681	Опачичі
Paryshiv	16	678	Паришів
Lubianka	12	612	Луб'янка
Poliske	10	12,000	Поліське
Otashiv	10	71	Оташів
Ladyzhychi	8	683	Ладижичі
Rudnia-Illinetska	8	114	Рудня-Іллінецька
Zapillia	5	2,849	Запілля
Vilcha	3	3,000	Вільча
Novoshepelychi	2	1,683	Новошепеличі

A few families live in the city of Chernobyl illegally, after migrating from areas outside the Exclusion Zone to escape poverty. These people have ignored government orders to leave the area and are hostile to journalists. Local administration claims the squatters have occupied several houses in the city, without proper permission from the original owners.

In April 2013, Minister of Social Policy of Ukraine Natalia Korolevska said the settlers are getting full social support from the government, but she excluded the possibility of legalizing their settlements in the Zone, as it is still prohibited to live there. Korolevska confirmed the Social Policy of Ukraine does not register illegal settlers but estimates their number to be about 200–2,000 people in 2013.

Following the outbreak of the war in Donbas in 2014, refugees from that conflict settled in the Chernobyl Exclusion Zone or nearby.
