= Uzh (Pripyat) =

River in Ukraine

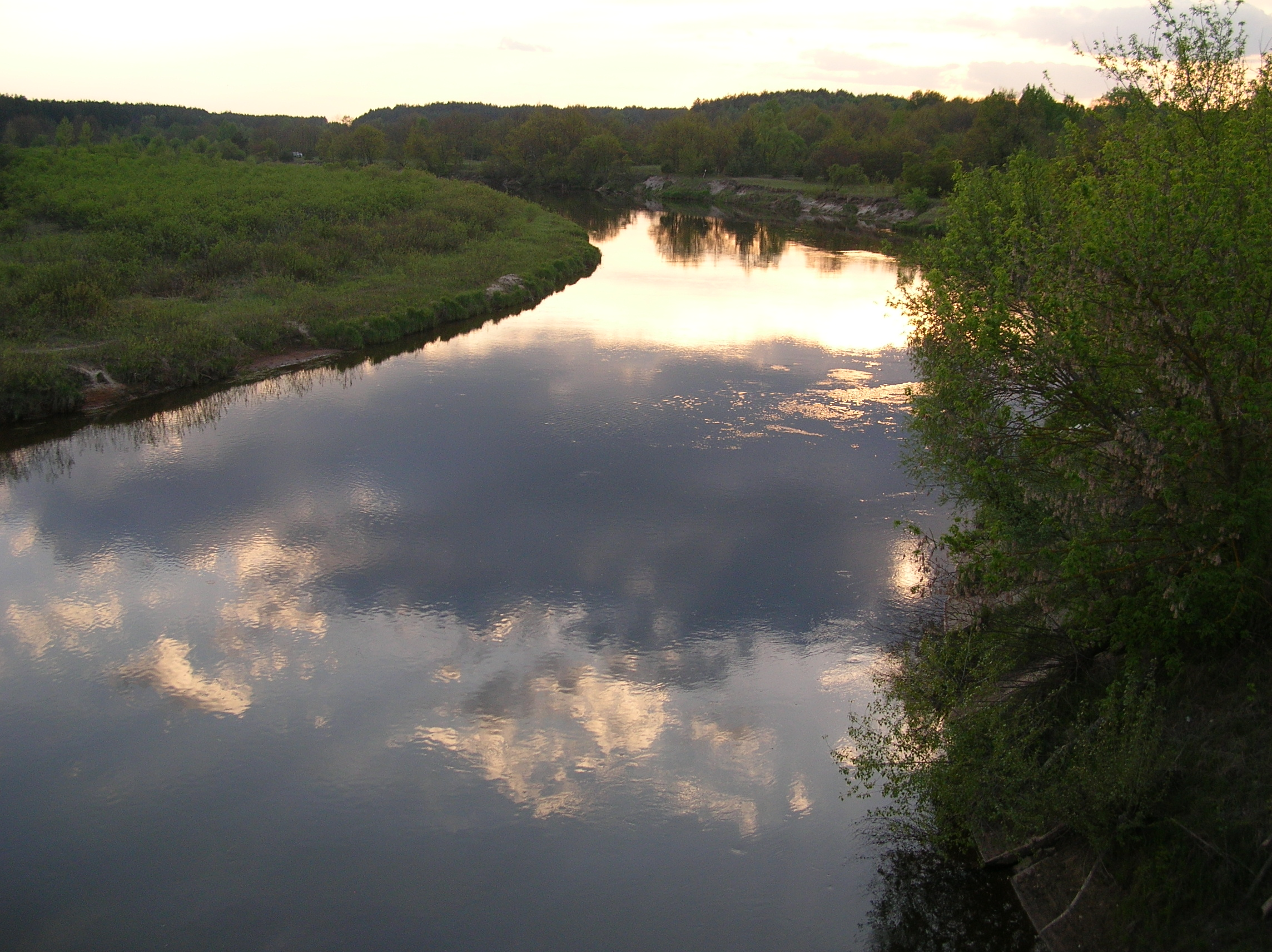
- The Uzh seen near Chernobyl.

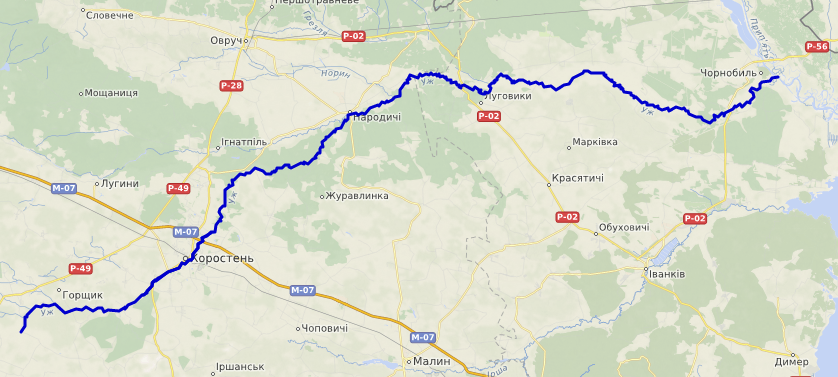
- The Uzh river
- Native name: Уж (Ukrainian)

Location
- Country: Ukraine
- State: Zhytomyr Oblast, Kyiv Oblast
- City: Korosten

Physical characteristics
- Mouth: Pripyat
  - location: Kyiv Reservoir
  - coordinates: 51.2542°N 30.2357°E
- Length: 256 km (159 mi)
- Basin size: 8,080 km^{2} (3,120 sq mi)

Basin features
- Progression: Pripyat→ Dnieper→ Dnieper–Bug estuary→ Black Sea

The Uzh (Ukrainian: Уж) is a river in Ukraine, serving as a right tributary of the Pripyat, which flows into the Kyiv Reservoir, in central Ukraine. It originates in the Zhytomyr Oblast (province) of northern Ukraine, and then flows briefly near the delta of the Berezina River. The Uzh then flows near the city of Chernobyl of Kyiv Oblast, before emptying into the Pripyat River.

== Characteristics ==
Its length is 256 km (159 mi) and its drainage basin covering 8,080 km^{2} (3,120 sq mi). The length of the river's valleys vary from 1–7 km (0.62–4.35 mi) long, while the length of its channels ranges from 5–40 km (3.1–24.9 mi). The width of the valley varies from 1 to 7 km, and the river itself ranges from 5 to 40 meters. The slope of the river is 0.47 m / km.

The mineralization of the river's with the following average measurements:

- spring flood - 126 mg / dm³;
- summer-autumn - 198 mg / dm³;
- winter cesspools - 214 mg / dm³.

The river takes its source from the spring thaws and it freezes over in the winter, only thawing in late March, from which it takes much of its water supply.

== Location ==
The cities of Korosten and Chernobyl are located on the Uzh river.

== Bibliography ==
- Geographical Encyclopedia of Ukraine: 3 t. / Editorial Board: O. M. Marinych (repl. Ed.) And others. - K.: "Ukrainian Soviet Encyclopedia" by them. M.P. Bazhana, 1989.
