= Vyshhorod Raion =

Subdivision of Kyiv Oblast, Ukraine

Vyshhorod Raion Вишгородський район
- Raion
- Вишгородський район (Vyshhorodskyi raion)
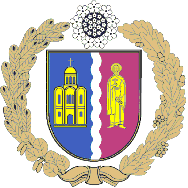
- Flag Coat of arms

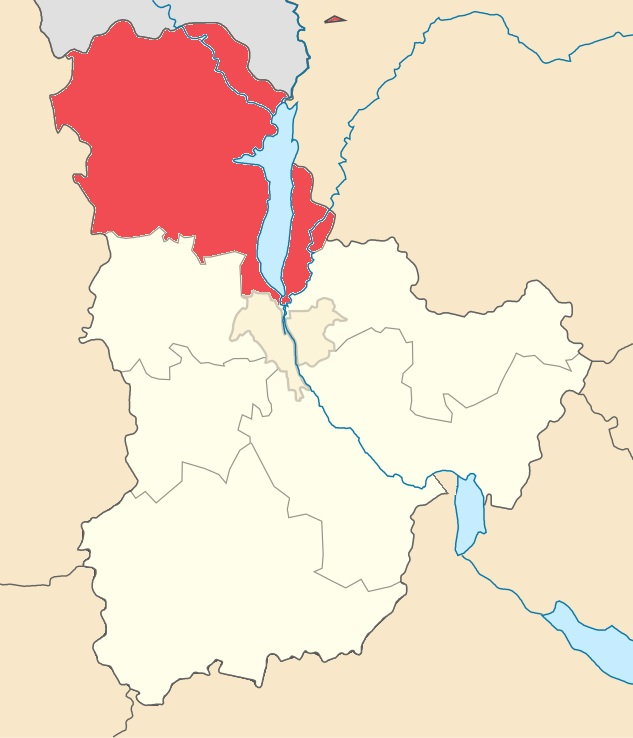
- Vyshhorod Raion after the 2020 raion reform
- Coordinates: 50°49′4″N 30°19′23″E
- Country: Ukraine
- Oblast: Kyiv Oblast
- Established: April 12, 1973
- Admin. center: Vyshhorod
- Subdivisions: 7 hromadas

Population (2022)
  - Total: 132,136
- Time zone: UTC+02:00 (EET)
  - Summer (DST): UTC+03:00 (EEST)
- Area code: +380

Vyshhorod Raion (Ukrainian: Вишгородський район) is a raion (district) in Kyiv Oblast, Ukraine. Its administrative center is the city of Vyshhorod. It has a population of 132,136 (2022 estimate). The area primarily in the north remains part of the enclosed Chernobyl Exclusion Zone due to high radioactive contamination from the 1986 Chernobyl disaster. The area was significantly affected with permanent resettlements and abandonment.

On 18 July 2020, as part of the administrative reform of Ukraine, the number of raions of Kyiv Oblast was reduced to seven, and the area of Vyshhorod Raion was significantly expanded. Two abolished raions, Ivankiv and Poliske Raions, as well as the cities of Slavutych and Vyshhorod, which were previously incorporated as cities of oblast significance and did not belong to the raion, were merged into Vyshhorod Raion. The January 2020 estimate of the raion population was 76,347 (2020 est.).

== Description ==
The raion was created on April 12, 1973, from territories of Ivankiv Raion and Kyiv-Sviatoshyn Raion. The raion is located around the Kyiv Reservoir. Its administrative center is at the southern edge of the territory.

Before 2020, the raion bordered four other raions of Kyiv Oblast and two other regions of Ukraine – the city of Kyiv and Chernihiv Oblast. To the north and northwest from the raion Ivankiv Raion was located which also included territory of the former Chernobyl Raion, to the west there was Borodianka Raion, to the southwest Vyshhorod Raion bordered with Kyiv-Sviatoshyn Raion, to the south with Obolon Raion of the city of Kyiv, to the southeast with Brovary Raion, while to the east and northeast it bordered Kozelets Raion of Chernihiv Oblast.

Former President of Ukraine Viktor Yanukovych's private residence Mezhyhirya is located near the village of Novi Petrivtsi.

== Subdivisions ==
=== Current ===
After the reform in July 2020, the raion consisted of 7 hromadas:

Obukhiv Raion subdivisions
Hromada (Community)	Admin. center	Population (2020)	Transferred/Retained from
Chernobyl exclusion zone	Kyiv	0	
Dymer settlement	Dymer	21,042	
Ivankiv settlement	Ivankiv	28,798	Ivankiv Raion;
Petrivtsi rural	Novi Petrivtsi	12,001	
Pirnove rural	Pirnove	6,764	
Poliske settlement	Krasiatychi	5,391	Poliske Raion;
Slavutych urban	Slavutych	24,464	city of oblast significance of Slavutych;
Vyshhorod urban	Vyshhorod	33,276	

There are no official residents in the Chernobyl exclusion zone which is under special administration from a state agency. Due to elevated radiation certain people are allowed to live who are known as samosely. The city of Slavutych, an exclave in Chernihiv Oblast, remains a de facto company-type of community connected with the Chernobyl exclusion zone.

=== Before 2020 ===
Before the 2020 reform, the raion consisted of four hromadas,

- Dymer settlement hromada with the administration in Dymer;
- Petrivtsi rural hromada with the administration in Novi Petrivtsi;
- Pirnove rural hromada with the administration in Pirnove;
- Vyshhorod urban hromada with the administration in Vyshhorod.

== Notable people ==
- Peter Andreychuk (1892-1937), victim of religious persecution
- Hanna Veres, textile artist

== Gallery ==
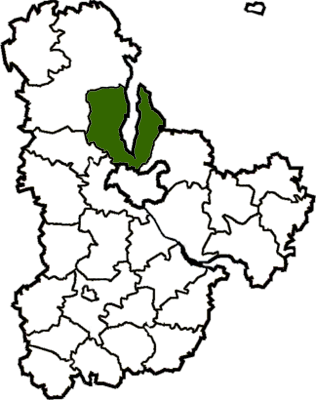
Vyshhorod Raion in Kyiv Oblast (1966-2020)

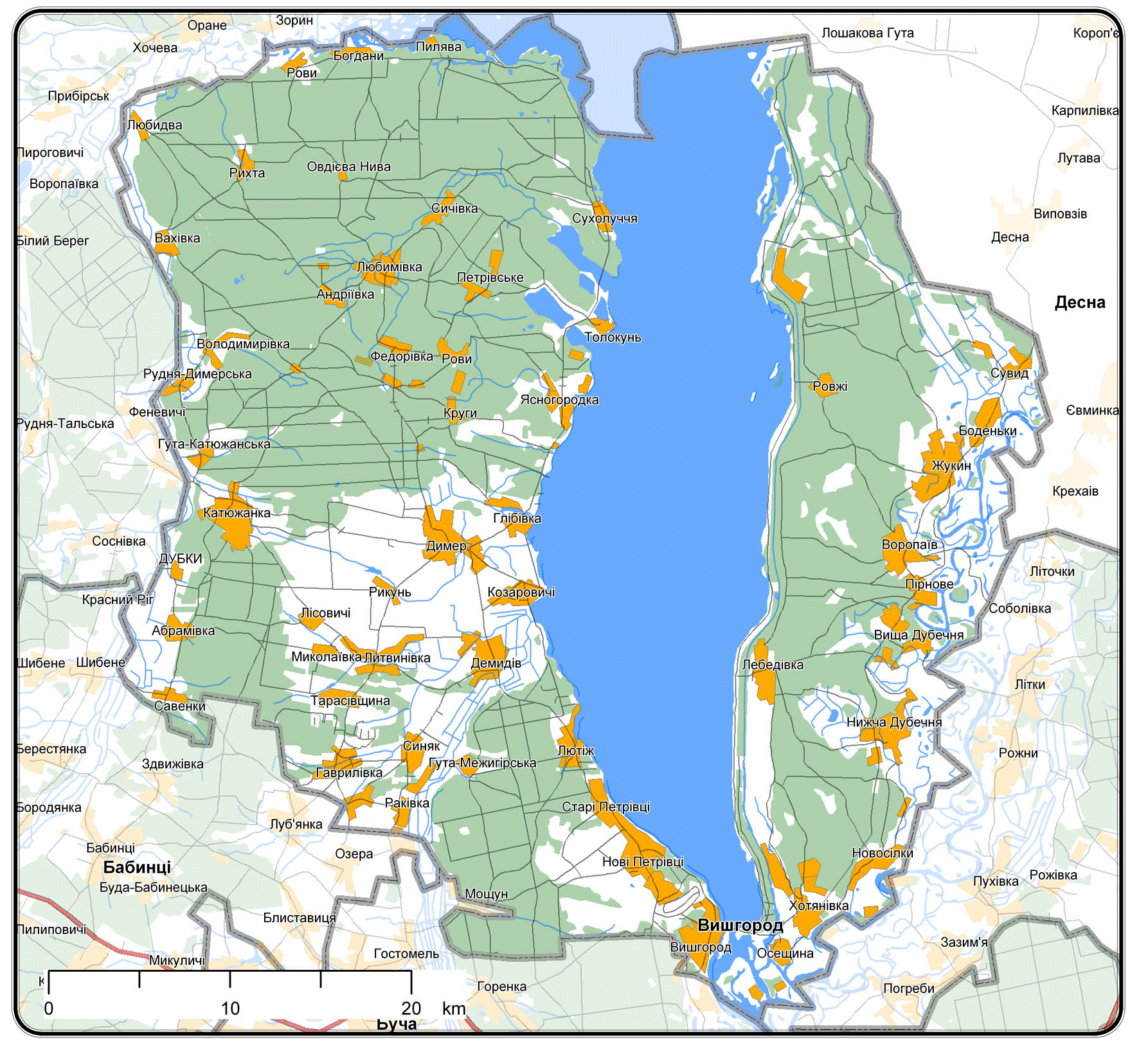
Vyshhorod Raion map before the 2020 raion reform

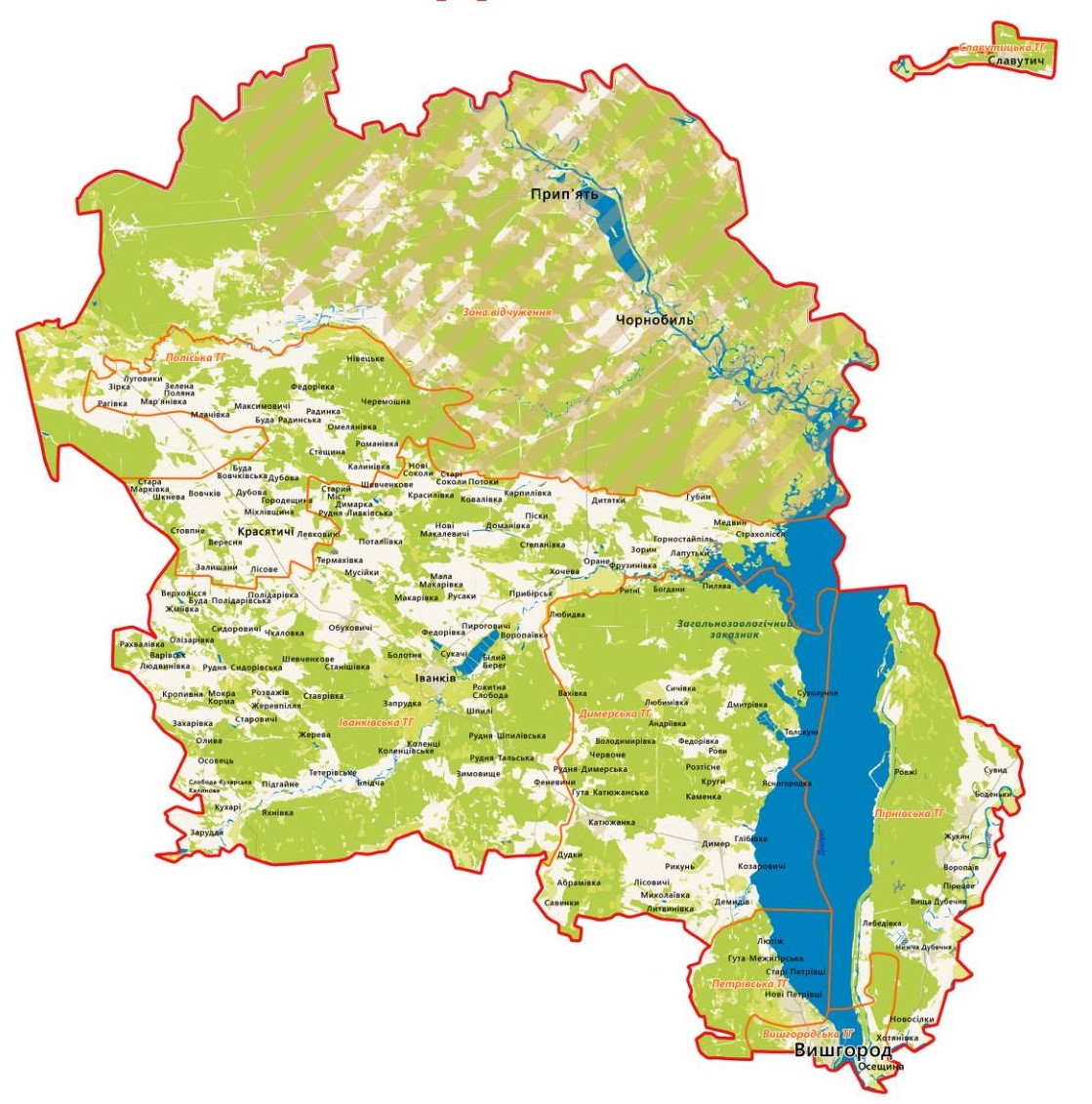
Vyshhorod Raion map after the 2020 raion reform

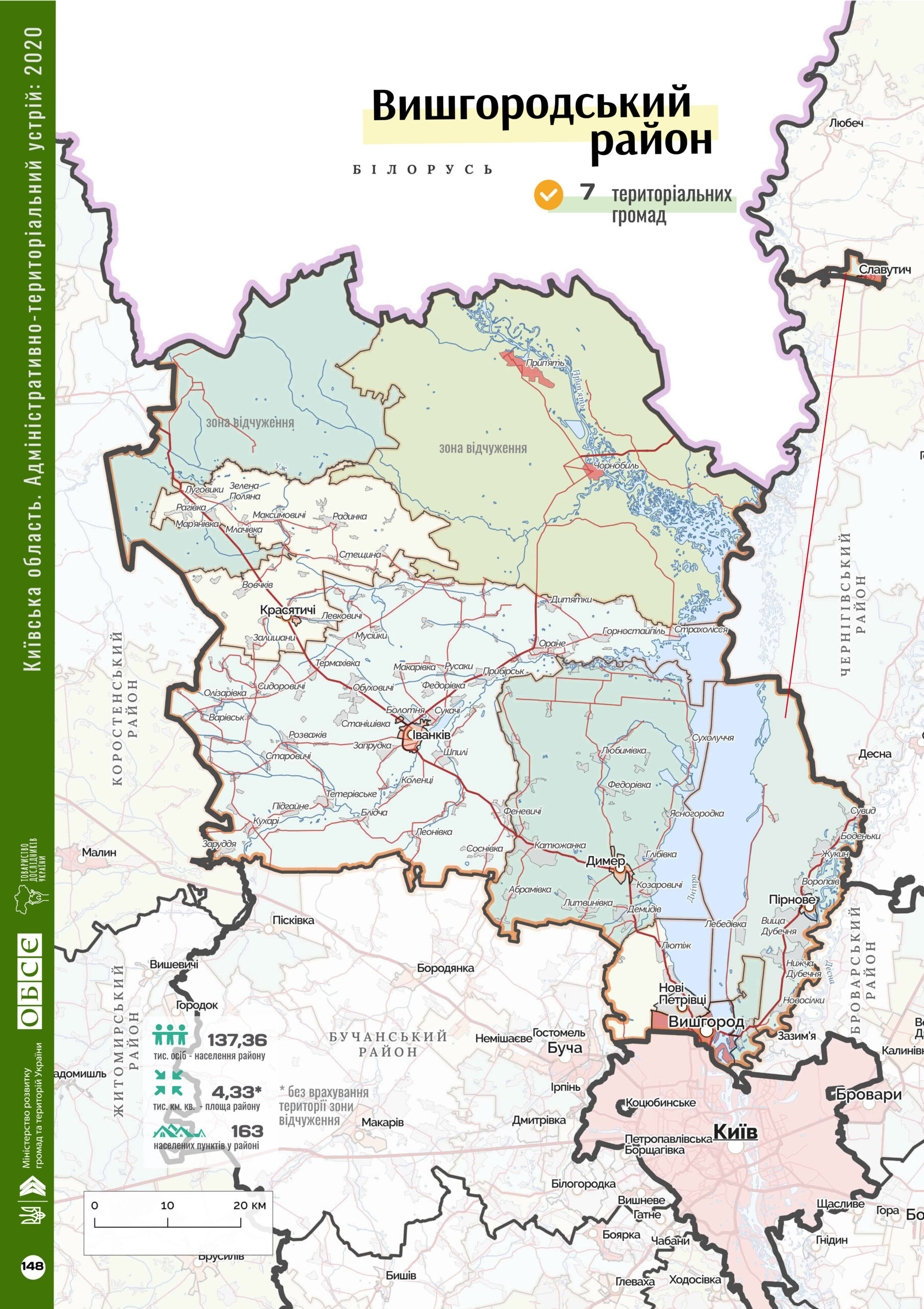
Vyshhorod Raion map after the 2020 raion reform
