= Kostin =

Kostin (Russian: Костин) is a Russian masculine surname, its feminine counterpart is Kostina. The surname is derived from Kostya, a pet form of the male given name Konstantin, and literally means Kostya's. It may refer to:

== People ==
- Aleksandr Kostin (born 1969), Russian football player
- Aleksandra Kulicheva (Kostina, born 1987), Russian basketball player
- Andrey Kostin (born 1956), Russian banker
- Andriy Kostin (born 1973), Ukrainian lawyer and politician
- Denis Kostin (born 1995), Russian ice hockey goaltender
- Ekaterina Kostina, Belarusian-German mathematician
- Igor Kostin (1936–2015), Soviet photographer
- Kirill Kostin (born 1994), Russian football player
- Klim Kostin (born 1999), Russian professional ice hockey winger
- Konstantin Kostin (figure skater) (born 1973), Latvian figure skater
- Konstantin Kostin (politician) (born 1970), Russian politician
- Maria Kostina (born 1983), Russian golfer
- Mikhail Kostin (born 1985), Russian football player
- Oleg Kostin (born 1992), Russian swimmer
- Oxana Kostina (1972–1993), Russian rhythmic gymnast
- Sergei Kostin (born 1991), Russian football defender
- Vera Kostina (born 1932), Soviet former swimmer
- Vladimir Kostin (1921–1994), Russian basketball referee

== Places ==
- Kostina, the former German name for the village of Costâna, located within the commune of Todirești, Suceava county, Romania
- Kostina, Soldatsky selsovet, Fatezhsky District, Kursk Oblast, rural locality in Russia
- Kostina, Bolshezhirovsky selsovet, Fatezhsky District, Kursk Oblast, rural locality in Russia

== See also ==
- Kostino (disambiguation)
