= 2026 Chernobyl exclusion zone wildfires =

Forest fires in Chernobyl exclusion zone

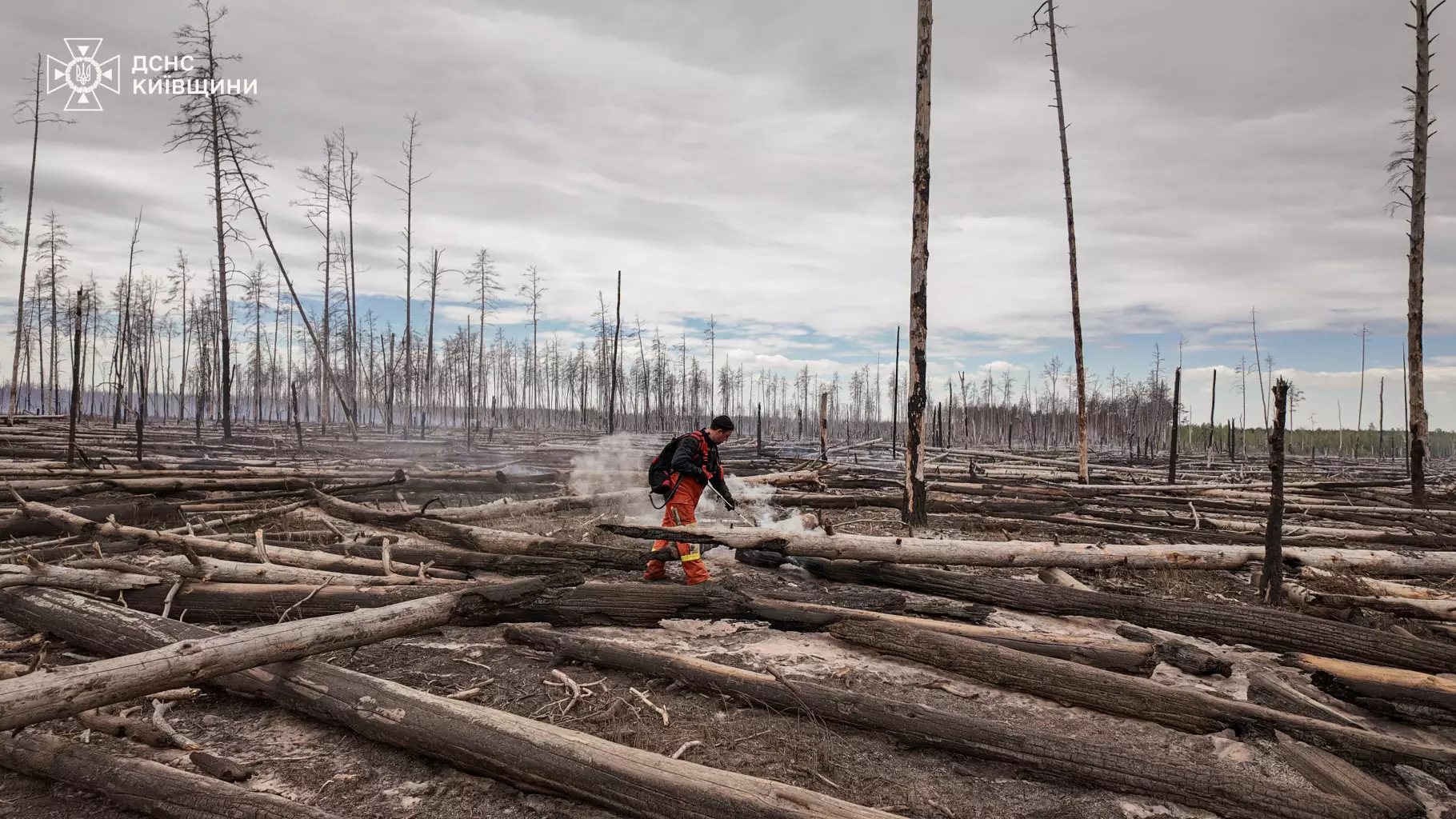
Forest fire in Chernobyl exclusion zone in May 2026

The 2026 Chernobyl exclusion zone wildfires are a series of wildfires burning inside Ukraine's Chernobyl exclusion zone.

The main causes of the fires are linked to the continued Russian invasion of Ukraine.

== May ==
On 7 May 2026, a major crown fire was reported, sparked by a crashes of two military drones. By 9 May, it had spread to about 1,100 hectares on the left bank of the Pripyat River. After the liquidation of the earlier fires, on 14 May, new fire locations were reported. Remains of Russian drones Geran-2 were found at their crash sites.

== June and July ==
The new major fires began on 25 June. In the next three days the resulting smog spread southward, which worsened the air quality in Kyiv and Kyiv Oblast. On 29–30 June, the State Agency of Ukraine of on Exclusion Zone Management reported that forest fires caused by downed Russian drones were still being liquidated.

On 3 July, the State Emergency Service of Ukraine (SESU) reported four fire outbreaks in the exclusion zone. This was also confirmed by NASA Fire Information for Resource Management System monitoring. Radiation was reported to be within norms. SESU reported that the fire formed a fire tornado. On July, 10, the State Emergency Service reported that the fires, which were spreading via litter and fallen timber, were extinguished.

== See also ==
- 2020 Chernobyl exclusion zone wildfires
