= Atey Combat Battalion =

Military combat unit of the National Guard of Ukraine,

- Active: February 11, 2023 – present
- Country: Ukraine
- Allegiance: Ministry of Internal Affairs of Ukraine
- Branch: National Guard of Ukraine
- Type: Combat battalion
- Role: Reconnaissance and assault operations, special operations, protection of strategic facilities
- Size: Battalion
- Part of: 28th "Chernobyl" Regiment of the NGU (Military Unit 3041)
- Headquarters: Chornobyl, Kyiv Oblast
- Nickname: Atey
- Motto: "Become Part of the Legend"
- Engagements: Russian invasion of Ukraine
- Website: atey.army

Commanders
- Commanding Officer: Major Yevhen Bezsmertnyi (callsign "Skif")

Atey Combat Battalion (Ukrainian: Батальйон оперативного призначення «АТЕЙ») is a combat unit of the National Guard of Ukraine, operating as part of the 28th "Chernobyl" Regiment (Military Unit 3041). The battalion carries out combat missions on some of the most intense sectors of the Russo-Ukrainian War, including in the vicinity of Pokrovsk, while also securing the Chernobyl Exclusion Zone, Ukraine's northern border with the Republic of Belarus, and countering aerial threats as part of mobile fire groups.

== History ==
=== 2022 ===
The history of the Atey unit began during the first months of the full-scale invasion of Ukraine by the Russian Federation. The future combat core of the unit was formed from servicemen of the National Guard of Ukraine who took part in the defense of Kyiv Oblast during the Russian offensive on the capital.

During this period, the personnel who later became the foundation of the Atey unit carried out combat missions under active hostilities, ensuring the defense of the northern direction and participating in halting Russian forces on the approaches to Kyiv. Following the completion of the defensive operation in Kyiv Oblast, part of the servicemen continued participating in combat operations in the eastern and southern regions of Ukraine.

=== 2023 ===
On February 11, 2023, the separate Atey Special Purpose Reconnaissance Platoon was established within the "Rubizh" Operational Purpose Brigade of the National Guard of Ukraine. The unit included servicemen with real combat experience, including fighters from temporarily occupied territories of Ukraine.

Throughout 2023, the Atey reconnaissance platoon carried out combat missions on the eastern and southern sectors of the front, operating in Donetsk Oblast, Luhansk Oblast, Kharkiv Oblast, and southern Ukraine. The unit's primary tasks included reconnaissance, detection of enemy positions, fire adjustment, support of assault groups, and special operations, often in areas with intensive use of artillery, FPV drones, and unmanned aerial systems.

Due to its combat experience and personnel expansion, the unit was expanded from a separate platoon into the Atey Special Purpose Reconnaissance Company within the "Rubizh" Brigade.

=== 2024 ===
At the beginning of 2024, during the expansion of the 1st Separate Battalion for the Protection of Especially Important State Facilities to regimental level within the 28th "Chernobyl" Regiment of the National Guard of Ukraine (Military Unit 3041), the Atey Combat Battalion was formally established.

Throughout 2024, the unit continued combat missions in eastern and southern Ukraine, conducting assault, reconnaissance, defensive, and special operations on some of the most challenging sectors of the front. Following rotations from active combat zones, personnel were assigned to secure the Chernobyl Exclusion Zone and sections of Ukraine's state border with Belarus. The battalion also became actively involved in mobile fire groups responsible for detecting and engaging Russian unmanned aerial vehicles.

=== 2025 ===
In 2025, the battalion completed a key stage of its development — the final integration of the combat battalion with the separate special unit "Atey." Following the merger, the combat core became the foundation of the battalion's modern structure.

On November 9, 2025, Major Yevhen Bezsmertnyi (callsign "Skif"), who had previously led the unit during its platoon and special purpose company stages, was appointed commanding officer of the battalion.

Throughout 2025, the battalion continued combat missions on the Pokrovsk sector and other areas of active operations, while also maintaining missions in the northern direction — protecting the Chernobyl Exclusion Zone, border sections, and airspace of Ukraine.

== Leadership ==
Since November 9, 2025, Atey Combat Battalion has been commanded by Major Yevhen Bezsmertnyi (callsign "Skif"), a career officer of the National Guard of Ukraine with combat experience gained during the Russo-Ukrainian War.

He received higher military education at the National Academy of the National Guard of Ukraine, completing a full course of professional officer training. Following graduation, he began service in Military Unit 2260 of the National Guard of Ukraine.

With the beginning of the full-scale invasion, he took direct part in combat operations during the defense of Kyiv Oblast. He later continued service within the "Rubizh" Operational Purpose Brigade, commanding the separate Atey Special Purpose Reconnaissance Platoon and leading the unit's expansion from a platoon to a special purpose company.

Under his command, Atey units conducted operations in Donetsk Oblast, Luhansk Oblast, and Kharkiv Oblast, as well as selected sectors of the southern front. In January 2025, he was appointed commander of a special purpose company within the 28th "Chernobyl" Regiment of the NGU, and on November 9, 2025, was appointed commanding officer of Atey Combat Battalion.

He has been awarded the departmental insignia "For Valiant Service," "For Courage," and "Cross of Honor," as well as the Presidential Award of Ukraine "For the Defense of Ukraine."

Commanders of Atey Combat Battalion
Rank	Name	Callsign	Period of command
Major	Yevhen Bezsmertnyi	"Skif"	November 9, 2025 – present

== Traditions ==
February 11 is the Day of Atey Combat Battalion — the day when the entire unit assembles together. It marks the official initiation into "Atey" and serves as a day of remembrance for the path that began with a special purpose reconnaissance platoon. On this day, the battalion commander and unit commanders recognize servicemen who have demonstrated professionalism, resilience, and strength under real combat conditions. It is also a day of quiet, dignified remembrance for fallen brothers-in-arms — those who gave their lives for the unit, for the country, and for every member of the battalion.

Training within the unit is conducted by instructors with real combat experience, following individual programs adapted to each serviceman's assigned role. Special emphasis is placed on the ability to think independently and make decisions under difficult, dynamic, and unpredictable conditions. Following the completion of training, the knowledge and skill level of each fighter significantly exceeds the standard of regular military units.

== In the media ==
External videos
- How a scout works — Behind the Scenes of the Ministry of Internal Affairs
- Fearless guys from Donbas: Rubizh Brigade scouts take Russians prisoner
- 1,900 metres — record sniper shot against Russian forces
- How to provoke a recon commander? Trench-clearing drills
- Weekly at the range: Atey special unit from Rubizh Brigade
- Story of a 21-year-old fighter from the Atey special unit
- Atey fighters: weapons and tactics
- Atey special unit: combat reports
- Atey at the front line

- "Trophy weapons aren't so bad: what weapons the Atey special unit trains with". Suspilne Donbas. November 4, 2023.
- "He was turned away as a volunteer, so he signed a contract: story of a 21-year-old fighter from occupied Makiivka". Suspilne Donbas. 2023.
- "War becomes routine: Ukrainian servicemen on military service and changes in the Armed Forces". Suspilne Donbas.
