= 2020 Chernobyl exclusion zone wildfires =

Forest fires in Chernobyl exclusion zone

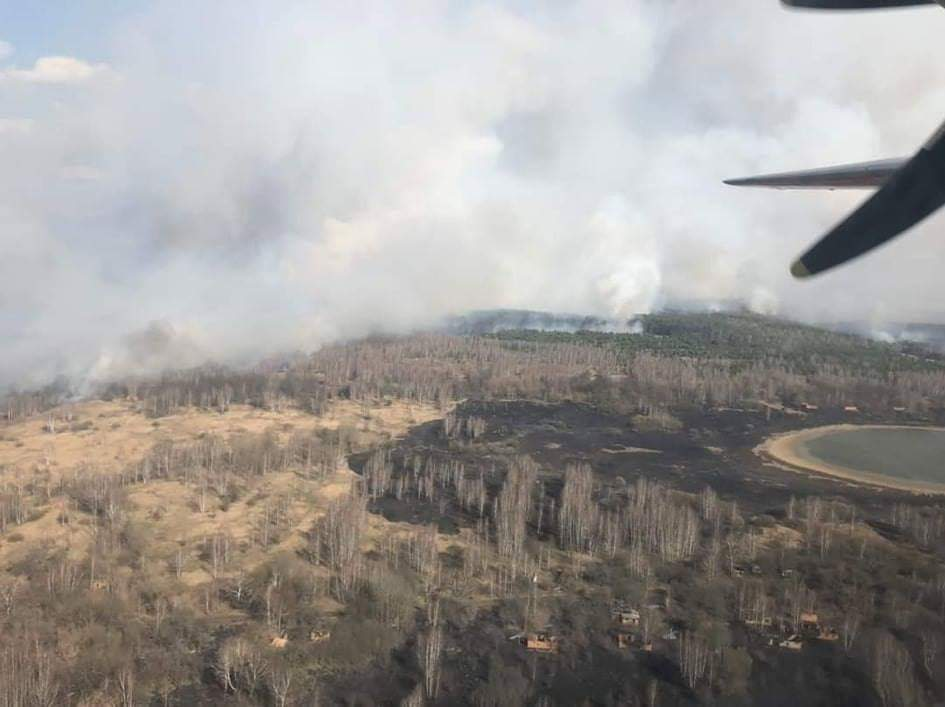
- Wildfire burning in the Chernobyl exclusion zone on 12 April 2020
- Location: Chernobyl exclusion zone, Kyiv Oblast, Ukraine

Statistics
- Total area: 116,139 acres (47,000 ha)

Impacts
- Deaths: None
- Structures destroyed: 30% of tourist attractions

The 2020 Chernobyl exclusion zone wildfires were a series of wildfires that began burning inside Ukraine's Chernobyl exclusion zone in April 2020. The fires were largely extinguished within two weeks. At least one suspect was arrested for alleged arson.

== Timeline ==
On 6 April radiation levels inside the zone were "16 times above normal" because of the fires. As the fire spread, a small village near the mostly abandoned town of Poliske was evacuated on April 10. By April 13, the wildfires had spread to just over 1.5 km (1 mi) away from the Chernobyl Nuclear Power Plant and had reached the outskirts of the abandoned city of Pripyat. More than 300 firefighters worked to stop the fires from reaching the plant. By 11 April, the firefighters had reached close to 400, with many helicopters and 100 fire engines dispersed to the Chernobyl exclusion zone. The State Emergency Service of Ukraine said it was still fighting the fires, but that the situation was under control, while Greenpeace said the situation was "much worse than Ukrainian authorities believe", citing satellite images. On 14 April, the State Emergency Service of Ukraine said all large fires inside the Exclusion Zone had been extinguished after ten days of firefighting efforts and recent rainfall in the region. According to Euro News, 124 firefighters were reported to have engaged the larger fire in Kotovsky Forest close to the village of Volodymyrivka.

== Suspect ==
A 27-year-old local resident was arrested for arson. It is unclear if the man, who has confessed to starting fires "for fun", is partly or fully responsible for the wildfires. The suspect told the authorities that he had set fire to dry grass close to the forest, without making an attempt to put out the fire as it started spreading. Fines for arson have been raised, after a vote by the parliament on 13 April.

== Damage ==
It was reported by a Forbes.com contributor that 30% of the tourist attractions in the exclusion zone had been destroyed, including the Soviet-era pioneer camp Izumrudnoe. The damage included several abandoned villages such as "Stara Markivka" surrounding Chernobyl that burnt down completely. Fire damage was also reported in the surrounding Red Forest where numerous trees were "swiftly" killed. The power plant itself, and the cities of Chernobyl and Pripyat survived "unscathed". President Volodymyr Zelenskyy disclosed on 26 April that the fires had ravaged about 11.5 thousand hectares.

== Environmental consequences ==
The wildfires caused a thick haze to blanket the capital Kyiv, making its air pollution among the worst in the world, comparable with that of some Chinese cities. IQAir reported that, at one point on April 16, Kyiv had the worst air pollution in the world. However, the smog has had little impact on the health of residents as it coincided with a lockdown due to the COVID-19 pandemic in Ukraine, which meant most people were indoors. On 17 April, despite the increase in radiation levels the United Nations atomic agency stated that the power plant does not pose a danger to human health, considering the reports issued by Ukraine. They also added that the concentration of radioactive materials in the air had stayed under the safety norms of Ukraine’s radiation, as discovered by the State Nuclear Regulatory Inspectorate of Ukraine.

== See also ==
- 2026 Chernobyl exclusion zone wildfires
