= Chernobyl exclusion zone =

Chernobyl Nuclear Power Plant Zone of Alienation Зона відчуження Чорнобильської АЕС
- Disaster exclusion zone
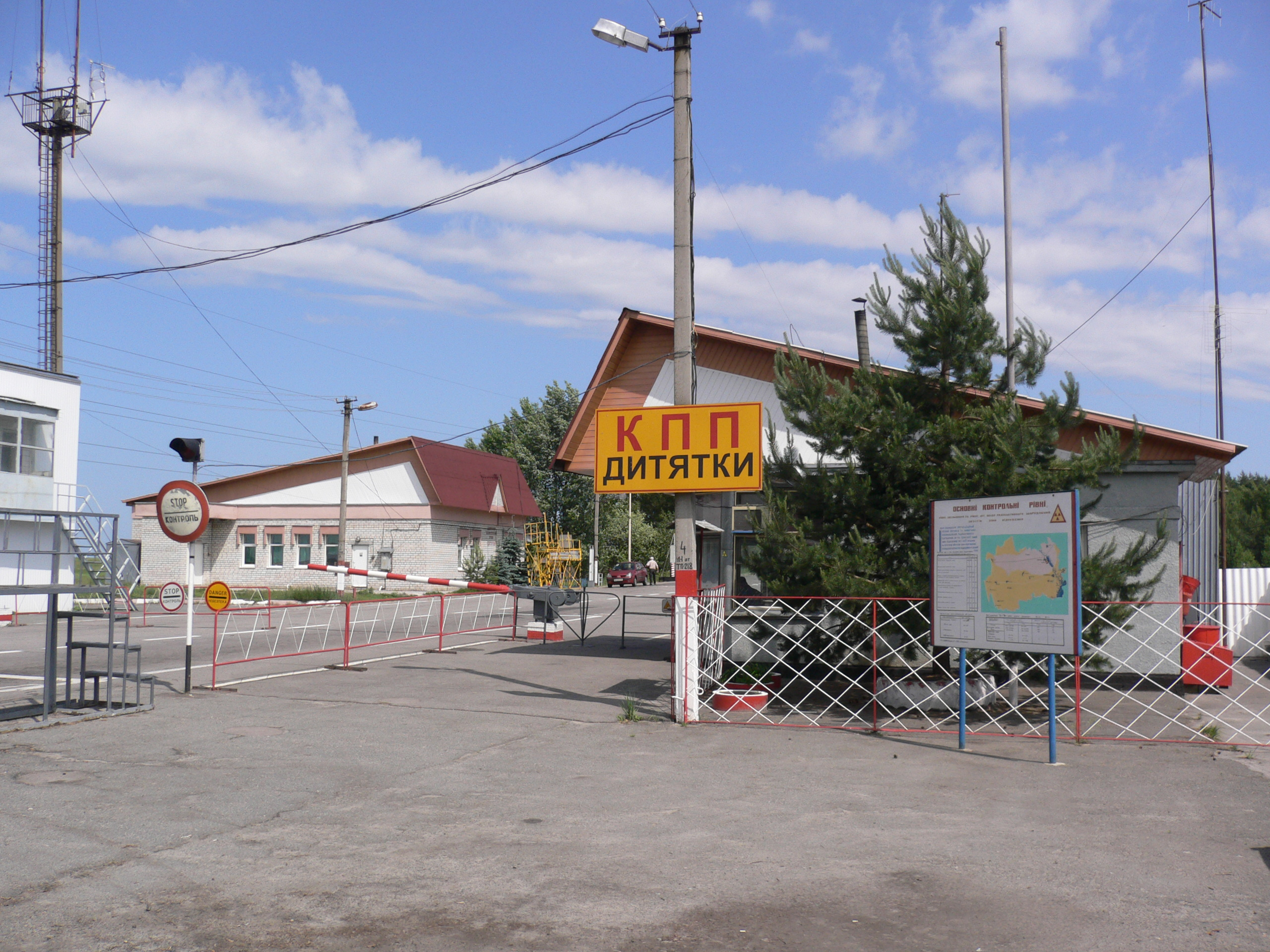
- Entrance to the Zone of Alienation at Dytiatky, 2010

- Map showing the "30-Kilometre Zone" (red) around the Chernobyl Nuclear Power Plant and the Polesie State Radioecological Reserve (orange) in neighbouring Belarus
- Interactive map of Chernobyl Nuclear Power Plant Zone of Alienation
- Location within Kyiv Oblast Location within Ukraine
- Coordinates: 51.3°N 30.005°E
- Country: Ukraine
- Oblasts: Kyiv Oblast; Zhytomyr Oblast (de jure)
- Raion: Vyshhorod Raion
- Founded: 27 April 1986; 40 years ago

Area
  - Total: 2,600 km^{2} (1,000 sq mi)

Population (2016)
  - Total: 180 samosely (Note: The Zone of Alienation is an "Area of Absolute (Mandatory) Resettlement" and employees of state agencies are residents on a temporary basis.)
  - Density: 0.069/km^{2} (0.18/sq mi)
- Time zone: UTC+2 (EET)
  - Summer (DST): UTC+3 (EEST)
- Website: dazv.gov.ua

The Chernobyl Nuclear Power Plant Zone of Alienation, (Note: Ukrainian: Зона відчуження Чорнобильської АЕС, romanized: Zona vidchuzhennia Chornobyl's'koyi AES; Belarusian: Зона адчужэння Чарнобыльскай АЭС, romanized: Zona adchuzhennia Charnobyl'skay AES; Russian: Зона отчуждения Чернобыльской АЭС, romanized: Zona otchuzhdeniya Chernobyl'skoy AES.) also called the 30-Kilometre Zone or simply The Zone, (Note: Ukrainian: Чорнобильська зона, romanized: Chornobyl's'ka zona; Belarusian: Чарнобыльская зона, romanized: Charnobyl'skaya zona; Russian: Чернобыльская зона, romanized: Chernobyl'skaya zona.) was established shortly after the 1986 Chernobyl disaster in the Ukrainian SSR of the Soviet Union.

Initially, Soviet authorities declared an exclusion zone spanning a 30-kilometre (19 mi) radius around the Chernobyl Nuclear Power Plant, designating the area for evacuations and placing it under military control. Its borders have since been altered to cover a larger area of Ukraine including the northernmost part of Vyshhorod Raion in Kyiv Oblast, and adjoins the Polesie State Radioecological Reserve in neighbouring Belarus. The Chernobyl exclusion zone is managed by the State Agency of Ukraine of on Exclusion Zone Management of the State Emergency Service of Ukraine, while the power plant and its sarcophagus and the New Safe Confinement are administered separately.

The current area of approximately 2,600 km^{2} (1,000 sq mi) in Ukraine is where radioactive contamination is the highest, and public access and habitation are accordingly restricted. Other areas of compulsory resettlement and voluntary relocation not part of the restricted exclusion zone exist in the surrounding areas and throughout Ukraine. In February 2019, it was revealed that talks were underway to re-adjust the exclusion zone's boundaries to reflect the declining radioactivity of its outer areas.

Public access to the exclusion zone is restricted in order to prevent access to hazardous areas, reduce the spread of radiological contamination, and conduct radiological and ecological monitoring activities. Today, the Chernobyl exclusion zone is one of the most radioactively contaminated areas on Earth and draws significant scientific interest for the high levels of radiation exposure in the environment, as well as increasing interest from disaster tourists. It has become a thriving sanctuary, with naturally diverse flora and fauna and some of the thickest forests in Ukraine, primarily due to the lack of human activity in the exclusion zone since 1986.

Since the beginning of the Russian invasion of Ukraine in February 2022, the Chernobyl exclusion zone has been the site of fighting with neighbouring Russia, which captured Chernobyl on 24 February 2022. By April 2022, the Kyiv offensive failed and Russian military withdrew from the region. Ukrainian authorities continue to keep the exclusion zone closed to tourists, pending cessation of hostilities in the Russo-Ukrainian war.

== History ==
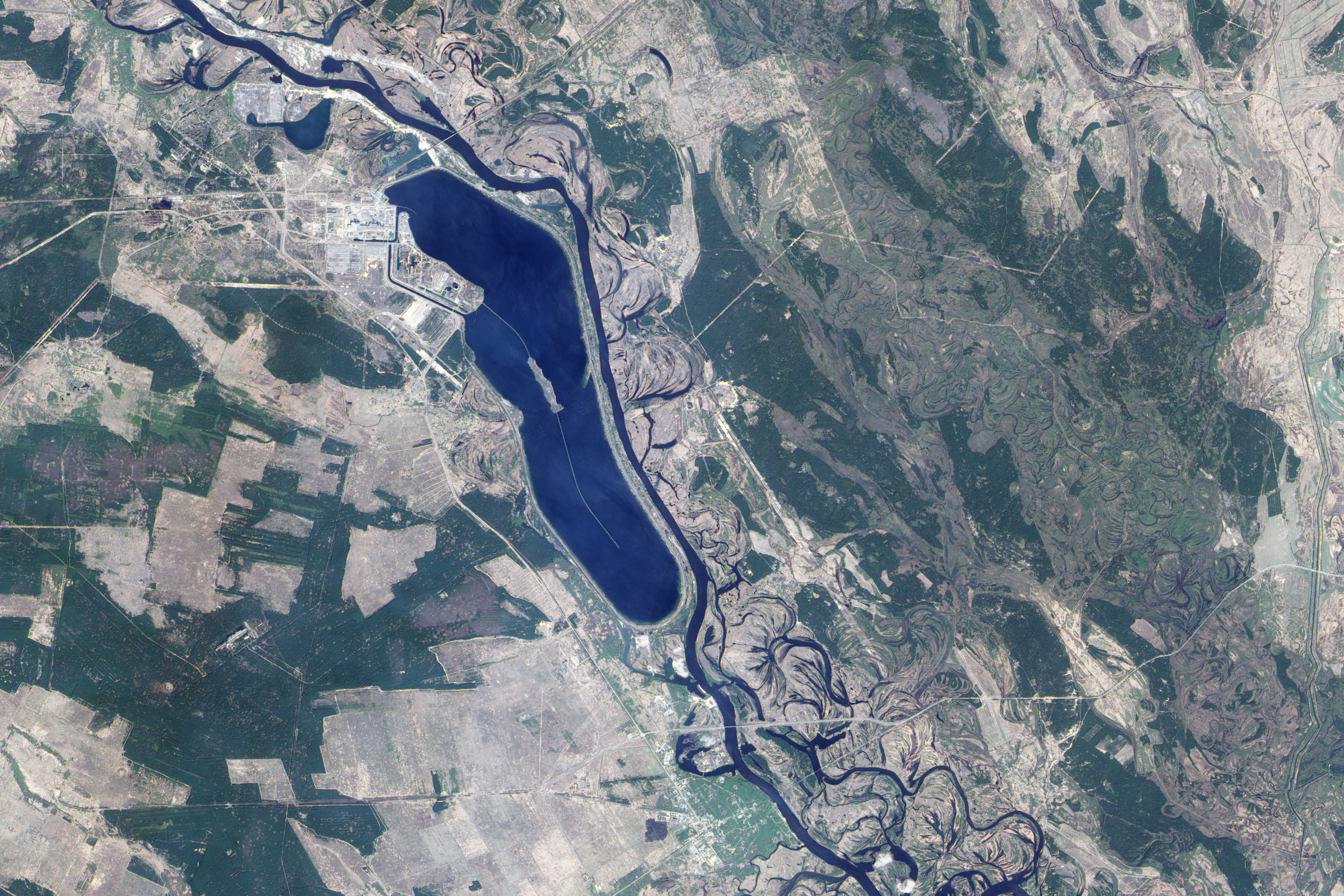
Satellite image of the reactor and surrounding area in April 2009

=== Pre-1986: Before the Chernobyl nuclear disaster ===
Historically and geographically, the zone is the heartland of the Polesia region. This predominantly rural woodland and marshland area was once home to 120,000 people living in the cities of Chernobyl and Pripyat as well as 187 smaller communities, but is now mostly uninhabited. All settlements remain designated on geographic maps but marked as нежил. (nezhyl.) – "uninhabited". The woodland in the area around Pripyat was a focal point of partisan resistance during the Second World War, which allowed evacuated residents to evade guards and return into the woods. In the woodland near the Chernobyl Nuclear Power Plant stood the "Partisan's Tree" or "Cross Tree", which was used to hang captured partisans. The tree fell down due to age in 1996 and a memorial now stands at its location.

=== 1986: Soviet exclusion zones ===
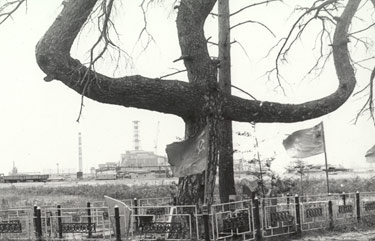
The oak Partisan's Tree or Cross Tree. The power plant is visible in the background.

==== 10-kilometre and 30-kilometre radius ====
The Exclusion Zone was established on 2 May 1986 soon after the Chernobyl disaster, when a Soviet government commission headed by Nikolai Ryzhkov decided on a "rather arbitrary" area of a 30-kilometre (19 mi) radius from Reactor 4 as the designated evacuation area. The 30 km Zone was initially divided into three subzones: the area immediately adjacent to Reactor 4, an area of approximately 10 km (6 mi) radius from the reactor, and the remaining 30 km zone. Protective clothing and available facilities varied between these subzones.

Later in 1986, after updated maps of the contaminated areas were produced, the zone was split into three areas to designate further evacuation areas based on the revised dose limit of 100 mSv.

- the "Black Zone" (over 200 μSv·h^{−1}), to which evacuees were never to return
- the "Red Zone" (50–200 μSv·h^{−1}), where evacuees might return once radiation levels normalized
- the "Blue Zone" (30–50 μSv·h^{−1}), where children and pregnant women were evacuated starting in the summer of 1986

Special permission for access and full military control was put in place in late 1986. Although evacuations were not immediate, 91,200 people were eventually evacuated from these zones.

In November 1986, control over activities in the zone was given to the new production association Kombinat. Based in the evacuated city of Chernobyl, the association's responsibility was to operate the power plant, decontaminate the 30 km zone, supply materials and goods to the zone, and construct housing outside the new town of Slavutych for the power plant personnel and their families.

In March 1989, a "Safe Living Concept" was created for people living in contaminated zones beyond the Exclusion Zone in Belarus, Ukraine, and Russia. In October 1989, the Soviet government requested assistance from the International Atomic Energy Agency (IAEA) to assess the "Soviet Safe Living Concept" for inhabitants of contaminated areas. "Throughout the Soviet period, an image of containment was partially achieved through selective resettlements and territorial delineations of contaminated zones."

=== Post-1991: Independent Ukraine ===
Radiation levels in 1996, according to a map from a CIA handbook

In February 1991, the law On The Legal Status of the Territory Exposed to the Radioactive Contamination resulting from the ChNPP Accident was passed, updating the borders of the Exclusion Zone and defining obligatory and voluntary resettlement areas, and areas for enhanced monitoring. The borders were based on soil deposits of strontium-90, caesium-137, and plutonium as well as the calculated dose rate (sieverts/h) as identified by the National Commission for Radiation Protection of Ukraine. Responsibility for monitoring and coordination of activities in the Exclusion Zone was given to the Ministry of Chernobyl Affairs.

In-depth studies were conducted from 1992 to 1993, completing an update of the 1991 law followed by further evacuations from the Polesia area. A number of evacuation zones were determined: the "Exclusion Zone", the "Zone of Absolute (Mandatory) Resettlement", and the "Zone of Guaranteed Voluntary Resettlement", as well as many areas throughout Ukraine designated as areas for radiation monitoring. The evacuation of contaminated areas outside of the Exclusion Zone continued in both the compulsory and voluntary resettlement areas, with 53,000 people evacuated from areas in Ukraine from 1990 to 1995.

After Ukrainian Independence, funding for the policing and protection of the zone was initially limited, resulting in even further settling by samosely (returnees) and other illegal intrusion.

In 1997, the areas of Poliske and Narodychi, which had been evacuated, were added to the existing area of the Exclusion Zone, and the zone now encompasses the exclusion zone and parts of the zone of Absolute (Mandatory) Resettlement of an area of approximately 2,600 km^{2} (1,000 sq mi). This Zone was placed under management of the 'Administration of the exclusion zone and the zone of absolute (mandatory) resettlement' within the Ministry of Emergencies.

On 15 December 2000, all nuclear power production at the power plant ceased after an official ceremony with then-President Leonid Kuchma when the last remaining operational reactor, number 3, was shut down.

In May 2025, it was reported that around 100 hectares of land in the Chernobyl exclusion zone had contamination drop to a level safe enough to allow farming to commence in those areas.

==== Russian invasion of Ukraine (2022–present) ====
The Chernobyl Exclusion Zone was the site of fighting between Russian and Ukrainian forces during the Battle of Chernobyl on 24 February 2022, as part of the Russian invasion of Ukraine. Russian forces reportedly captured the plant the same day.

Facilities at Chernobyl still require ongoing management, in part to ensure the continued cooling of spent nuclear fuel. An estimated 100 plant workers and 200 Ukrainian guards who were at the Chernobyl Nuclear Power Plant when the Russians arrived had been unable to leave. Normally they would change shifts daily and would not live at the site. They had limited supplies of medication, food, and electricity.

According to Ukrainian reports, the radiation levels in the exclusion zone increased after the invasion. The higher levels are believed to be a result of disturbance of radioactive dust by the military activity or possibly incorrect readings caused by cyberattacks.

On 10 March 2022, the International Atomic Energy Agency stated that it had lost all contact with Chernobyl.

On 22 March, the Ukrainian state agency responsible for the Chernobyl exclusion zone reported that Russian forces had destroyed a new laboratory at the Chernobyl Nuclear Power Plant. The laboratory, which opened in 2015, worked to improve the management of radioactive waste, among other things. "The laboratory contained highly active samples and samples of radionuclides that are now in the hands of the enemy, which we hope will harm itself and not the civilized world", the agency said in its statement.

On 27 March, Lyudmila Denisova, then–Verkhovna Rada Commissioner for Human Rights, said that 31 known individual fires covering 10,000 hectares were burning in the zone. These fires caused "...an increased level of radioactive air pollution", according to Denisova. Firefighters were unable to reach the fires due to the Russian forces in the area. These wildfires are seasonal; one fire that was 11,500 hectares in size took place in 2020, and a series of several smaller fires occurred throughout the 2010s.

On 31 March, it was reported that most of the Russian troops occupying Chernobyl withdrew. An Exclusion Zone employee made a post on Facebook suggesting that Russian troops were suffering from acute radiation sickness, based on a photo of military buses unloading near a radiation hospital in Belarus. Chernobyl operator Energoatom claimed that Russian troops had dug trenches in the most contaminated part of the Chernobyl exclusion zone, receiving "significant doses" of radiation. BBC News reported unconfirmed reports that some were being treated in Belarus.

On 3 April 2022, Ukrainian forces retook the Chernobyl power plant.

== Population ==
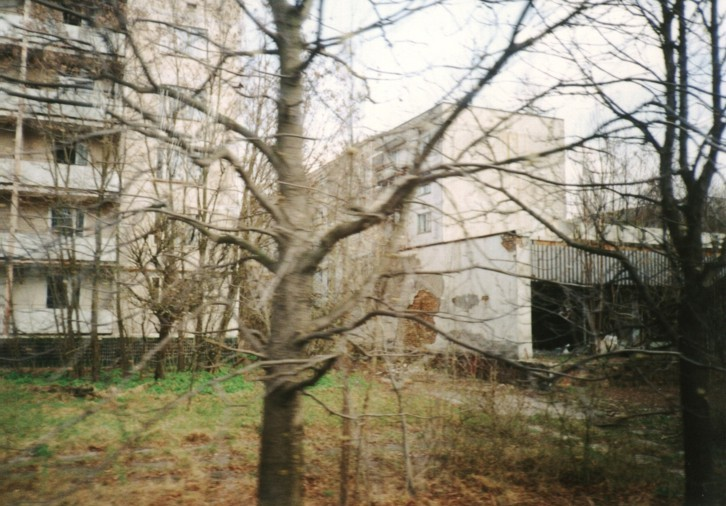
Abandoned apartment blocks in Pripyat

The 30-kilometre zone is estimated to be home to 197 Samosely living in 11 villages as well as in the town of Chernobyl. This number is in decline, down from previous estimates of 314 in 2007 and 1,200 in 1986. These residents are senior citizens, with an average age of 63. After repeated attempts at expulsion, the authorities have accepted their presence and allowed them to stay with limited supporting services. Residence is now informally permitted by the Ukrainian government.

Approximately 3,000 people work in the Zone of Alienation on various tasks, such as the construction of the New Safe Confinement, the ongoing decommissioning of the reactors, and assessment and monitoring of the conditions in the zone. Employees do not live inside the zone, but work shifts there. Some of the workers work "4-3" shifts (four days on, three days off), while others work 15 days on and 15 days off. Other workers commute into the zone daily from Slavutych. The duration of shifts is counted strictly for reasons involving pension and healthcare. Everyone employed in the Zone is monitored for internal bioaccumulation of radioactive elements.

The town of Chernobyl, located outside of the 10-kilometre Exclusion Zone, was evacuated following the accident but now serves as a base to support the workers within the Exclusion Zone. Its amenities include administrative buildings, general stores, a canteen, a hotel, and a bus station. Unlike other areas within the Exclusion Zone, the town is actively maintained by workers, such as lawn areas being mowed and autumn leaves being collected.

=== Access and tourism ===
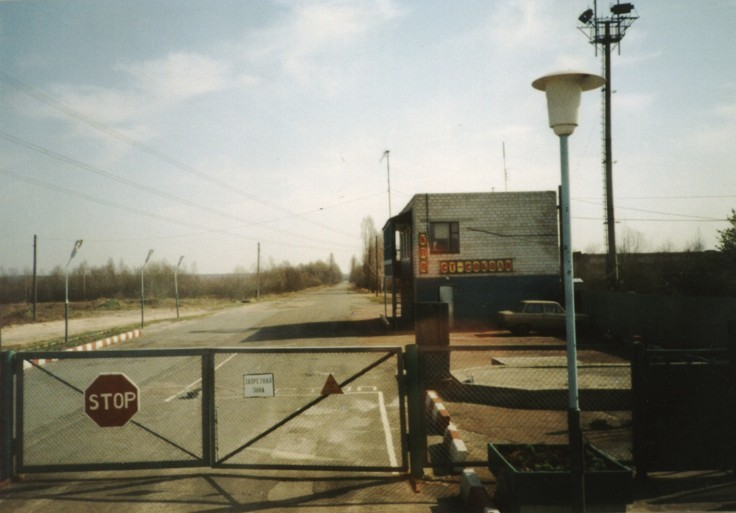
The entrance to the Zone of Alienation

Prior to the COVID-19 pandemic and Russian invasion there were many visitors to the Exclusion Zone annually, and daily tours from Kyiv. In addition, multiple-day excursions can be arranged with Ukrainian tour operators. Most overnight tourists stay in a hotel within the town of Chernobyl, which is located within the Exclusion Zone. As of 2017, there are approximately 50 licensed exclusion area tour guides in total, working for approximately nine companies. Visitors must present their passports when entering the Exclusion Zone and are screened for radiation when exiting, both at the 10 km checkpoint and at the 30 km checkpoint.

The Exclusion Zone can also be entered if an application is made directly to the zone administration department.

Some evacuated residents of Pripyat have established a remembrance tradition, which includes annual visits to former homes and schools. In the Chernobyl zone, there is one operating Eastern Orthodox church, St. Elijah Church. According to Chernobyl disaster liquidators, the radiation levels there are "well below the level across the zone", a fact that president of the Ukrainian Chernobyl Union Yury Andreyev considers miraculous.

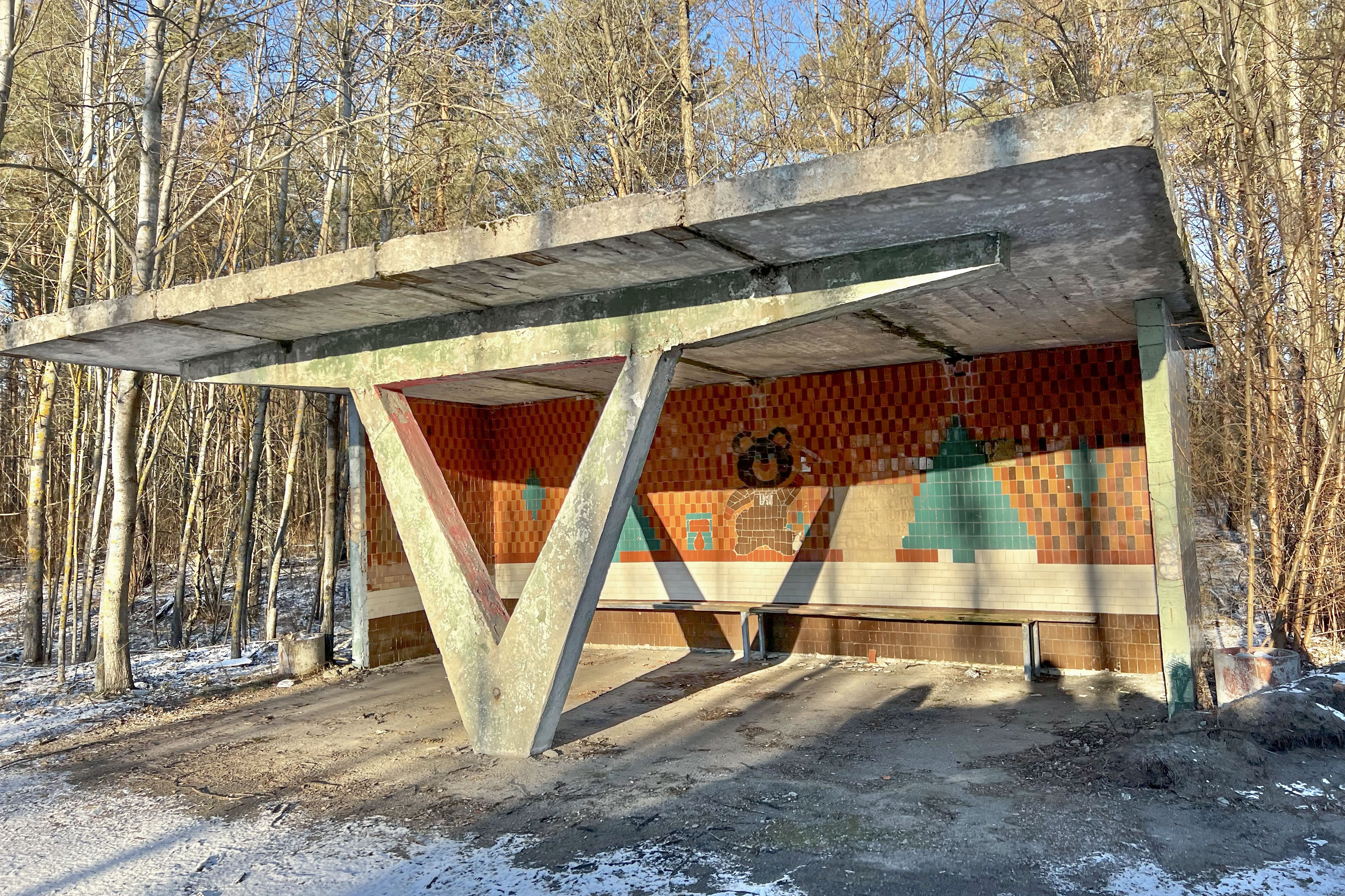
Bus stop near Duga radar with a mosaic of Misha

The Chernobyl Exclusion Zone has been accessible to interested parties such as scientists and journalists since the zone was created. An early example was Elena Filatova's online account of her alleged solo bike ride through the zone. This gained her Internet fame, but was later alleged to be fictional, as a guide claimed Filatova was part of an official tour group. Regardless, her story drew the attention of millions to the nuclear catastrophe. After Filatova's visit in 2004, a number of papers such as The Guardian and The New York Times began to produce reports on tours to the zone.

Tourism to the area became more common after Pripyat was featured in popular video games S.T.A.L.K.E.R.: Shadow of Chernobyl and Call of Duty 4: Modern Warfare. Fans of the S.T.A.L.K.E.R. franchise, who refer to themselves as "stalkers", often gain access to the Zone. The terms "The Zone" and "stalker" derive from Arkady and Boris Strugatsky's science fiction novel Roadside Picnic, which predates the accident. Liquidators and scientists working inside the ruined reactor building were the first to draw connections between fact and fiction, referring to themselves as 'Stalkers' from 1986 onward.

Prosecution of trespassers became more severe after a significant increase in trespassing in the Exclusion Zone. An article in the penal code of Ukraine was specially introduced, and horse patrols were added to protect the zone's perimeter.

In 2012, journalist Andrew Blackwell published Visit Sunny Chernobyl: And Other Adventures in the World's Most Polluted Places. Blackwell recounts his visit to the Exclusion Zone, when a guide and driver took him through the zone and to the reactor site.

On 14 April 2013, the 32nd episode of the wildlife documentary TV program River Monsters (Atomic Assassin, Season 5, Episode 1) was broadcast, featuring the host Jeremy Wade catching a wels catfish in the cooling pools of the Chernobyl power plant at the heart of the Exclusion Zone.

On 16 February 2014, an episode of the British motoring TV programme Top Gear was broadcast, featuring two of the presenters, Jeremy Clarkson and James May, driving into the Exclusion Zone.

A portion of the finale of the Netflix documentary Our Planet, released in 2019, was filmed in the Exclusion Zone. The area was used as the primary example of how quickly an ecosystem can recover and thrive in the absence of human interference.

In 2019, Chernobyl Spirit Company released Atomik Vodka, the first consumer product made from materials grown and cultivated in the exclusion zone.

On 11 April 2022, the zone administration department suspended the validity of passes that allowed access to the exclusion zone, for the duration of martial law in Ukraine. The zone remains closed to tourists as of April 2026.

=== Illegal activities ===
The poaching of game, illegal logging, vandalism, arson and metal theft have been problems within the zone. Despite police control, intruders started infiltrating the perimeter to remove potentially contaminated materials, from televisions to toilet seats, especially in Pripyat, where the residents of about 30 high-rise apartment buildings had to leave all of their belongings behind. In 2007, the Ukrainian government adopted more severe criminal and administrative penalties for illegal activities in the alienation zone, as well as reinforced units assigned to these tasks. The population of Przewalski's horse, introduced to the Exclusion Zone in 1998, has reportedly fallen since 2005 due to poaching.

== Administration ==
=== Government agencies ===
State Agency of Ukraine on Exclusion Zone Management

Agency overview
- Formed: 6 April 2011; 15 years ago
- Type: State agency
- Jurisdiction: Chernobyl Exclusion Zone
- Headquarters: Kyiv, Ukraine
- Agency executive: Vitalii Petruk
- Parent agency: State Emergency Service
- Website: dazv.gov.ua

In April 2011, the State Agency of Ukraine on the Exclusion Zone Management (SAUEZM) became the successor to the State Department – Administration of the exclusion zone and the zone of absolute (mandatory) resettlement according to presidential decree. The SAUEZM is, as its predecessor, an agency within the State Emergency Service of Ukraine.

Policing of the Zone is conducted by special units of the Ministry of Internal Affairs of Ukraine and, along the border with Belarus, by the State Border Guard Service of Ukraine.

The SAUEZM is tasked with:

1. Conducting environmental and radioactivity monitoring in the zone
2. Management of long-term storage and disposal of radioactive waste
3. Leasing of land in the exclusion zone and the zone of absolute (mandatory) resettlement
4. Administering of state funds for radioactive waste management
5. Monitoring and preservation of documentation on the subject of radioactivity
6. Coordination of the decommissioning of the nuclear power plant
7. Maintenance of a register of persons who have suffered as a result of the disaster

The Chernobyl Nuclear Power Plant is located inside the zone but is administered separately. Plant personnel, 3,800 workers as of 2009, reside primarily in Slavutych, a specially-built remote city in Kyiv Oblast outside of the Exclusion Zone, 45 kilometres (28 mi) east of the accident site.

=== Checkpoints ===
There are 11 checkpoints.

- Dytiatky, near the village of Dytiatky
- Stari Sokoly, near the village of Stari Sokoly
- Zelenyi Mys, near the village of Strakholissia
- Poliske, near the village of Chervona Zirka
- Ovruch, near the village of Davydky, Narodychi settlement hromada, Korosten Raion
- Vilcha, near the village of Vilkhova
- Dibrova, near the village of Fedorivka
- Benivka, near the city of Pripyat
- The city of Pripyat itself
- Leliv, near the city of Chernobyl
- Paryshiv, between the city of Chernobyl and the border with Belarus (route P56)

==== Development and recovery projects ====
The Chernobyl Exclusion Zone is an environmental recovery area, with efforts devoted to remediation and safeguarding of the reactor site. At the same time, projects for wider economic and social revival of the territories around the disaster zone have been envisioned or implemented.

In November 2007, the United Nations General Assembly adopted a resolution calling for "recovery and sustainable development" of the areas affected by the Chernobyl accident. Commenting on the issue, UN Development Programme officials mentioned the plans to achieve "self-reliance" of the local population, "agriculture revival" and development of ecotourism.

However, it is not clear whether such plans, made by the UN and then-President Victor Yushchenko, deal with the zone of alienation proper, or only with the other three zones around the disaster site where contamination is less intense and restrictions on the population are looser (such as the district of Narodychi in Zhytomyr Oblast).

Since 2011, tour operators have brought tourists inside the Exclusion Zone, although illegal tours may have operated prior to this. Tourists are accompanied by tour guides at all times and are not permitted to wander far on their own due to the presence of several radioactive "hot spots". Pripyat was deemed safe for tourists to visit for a short period of time in the late 2010s, although certain precautions must be taken.

In 2016, the Ukrainian government declared the part of the exclusion zone on its territory the Chernobyl Radiation and Environmental Biosphere Reserve.

It was reported in 2016 that "A heavily contaminated area within a 10-kilometer radius" of the plant would be used for the storage of nuclear waste. The IAEA carried out a feasibility study in 2018 to assess the prospect of expanding the local waste management infrastructure.

In 2017, three companies were reported developing plans for solar farms within the Chernobyl Exclusion Zone. The high feed-in tariffs offered, the availability of land, and easy access to transmission lines (which formerly ran to the nuclear power station) have all been noted as beneficial to siting a solar farm. The solar plant began operations in October 2018.

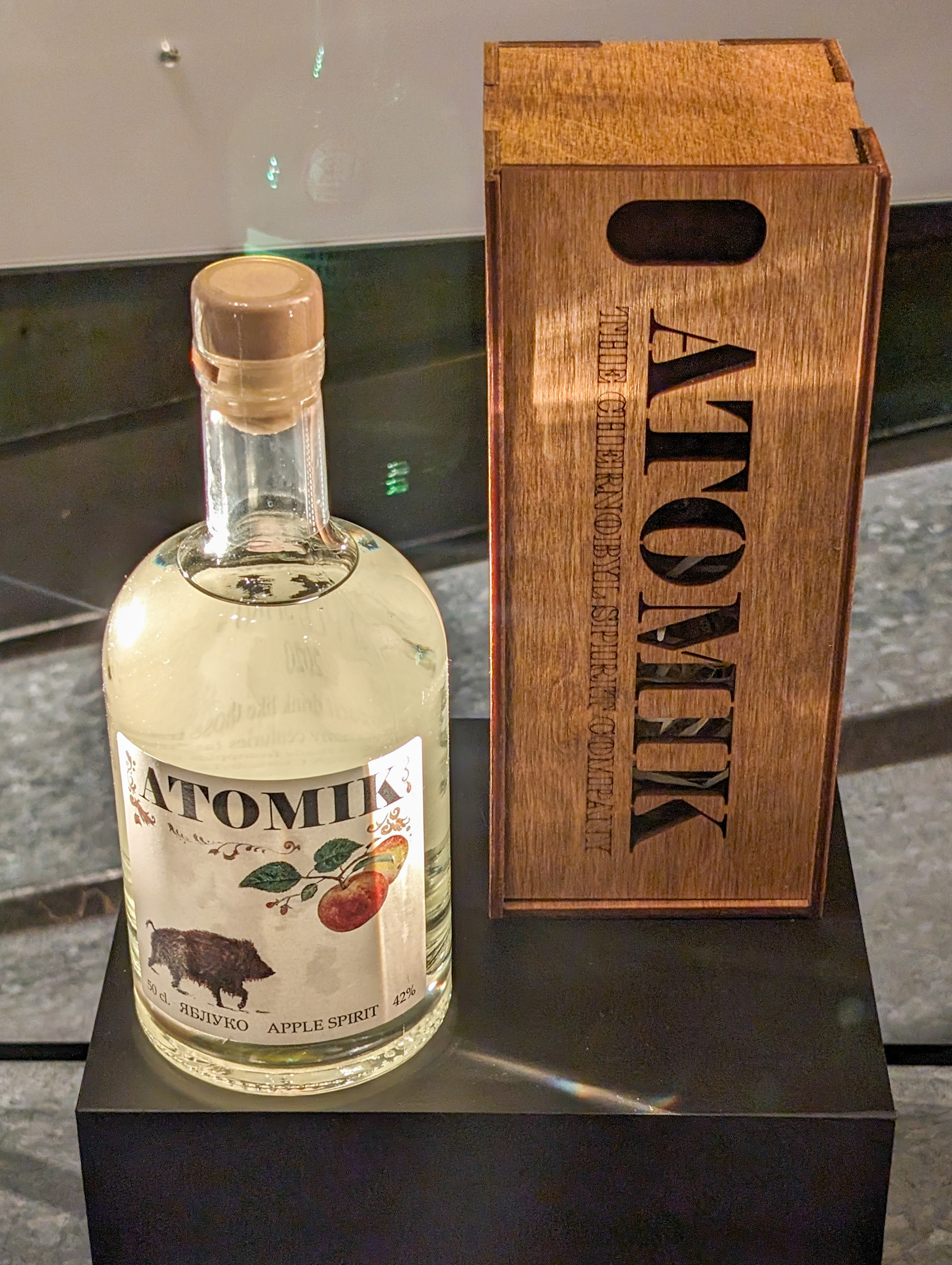
Atomik apple spirit made from apples grown in the Narodychi District of Ukraine

In 2019, following a three-year research project into the transfer of radioactivity to crops grown in the exclusion zone conducted by scientists from UK and Ukrainian universities, one bottle of vodka using grain from the zone was produced. The vodka did not contain abnormal levels of radiation because of the distillation process. The researchers consider the production of vodka, and its sales profits, a means to aid economic recovery of the communities most adversely affected by the disaster. The project later switched to producing and exporting "Atomik" apple spirit, made from apples grown in the Narodychi District.

== Radioactive contamination ==
The territory of the zone is polluted unevenly. Spots of hyperintensive pollution were created first by wind and rain spreading radioactive dust at the time of the accident, and subsequently by numerous burial sites for various material and equipment used in decontamination. Zone authorities pay attention to protecting such spots from tourists, scrap hunters, and wildfires, but admit that some dangerous burial sites remain unmapped, and only recorded in the memories of the (aging) Chernobyl liquidators.

=== Flora and fauna ===
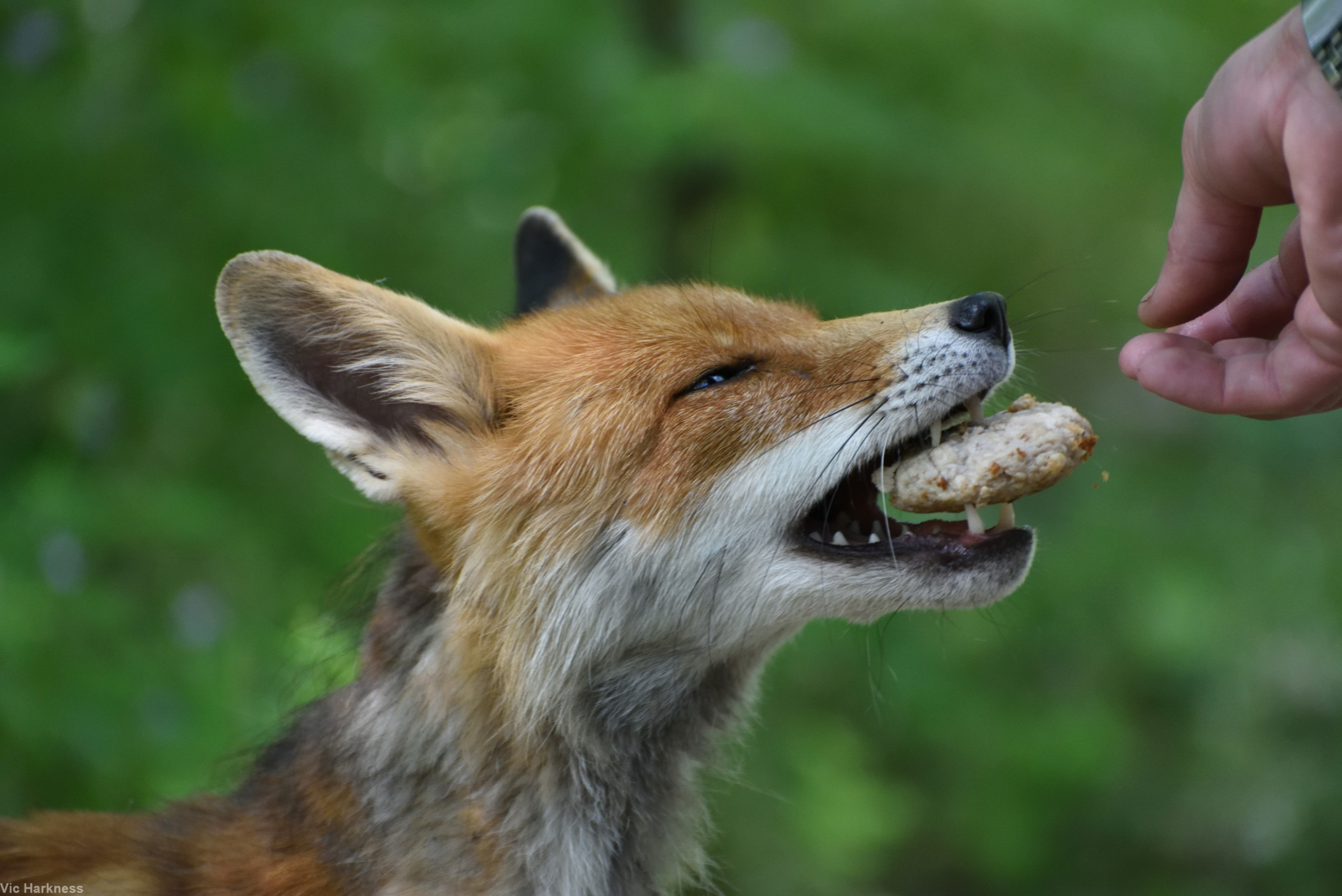
A wild fox being fed by a tourist in the Chernobyl Exclusion Zone

There has been an ongoing scientific debate about the extent to which flora and fauna of the zone were affected by the radioactive contamination that followed the accident. As noted by Baker and Wickliffe, one of many issues is differentiating between negative effects of Chernobyl radiation and effects of changes in farming activities resulting from human evacuation.

"Twenty-five years after the Chernobyl meltdown, the scientific community has not yet been able to provide a clear understanding of the spectrum of ecological effects created by that radiological disaster."

Near the facility, a dense cloud of radioactive dust killed off a large area of Scots pine trees; the rusty orange color of the dead trees led to the nickname "The Red Forest" (Рудий ліс). The Red Forest was among the world's most radioactive places; to reduce the hazard, the Red Forest was bulldozed and the highly radioactive wood was buried, though the soil continues to emit significant radiation. Other species in the same area, such as birch trees, survived, indicating that plant species may vary considerably in their sensitivity to radiation.

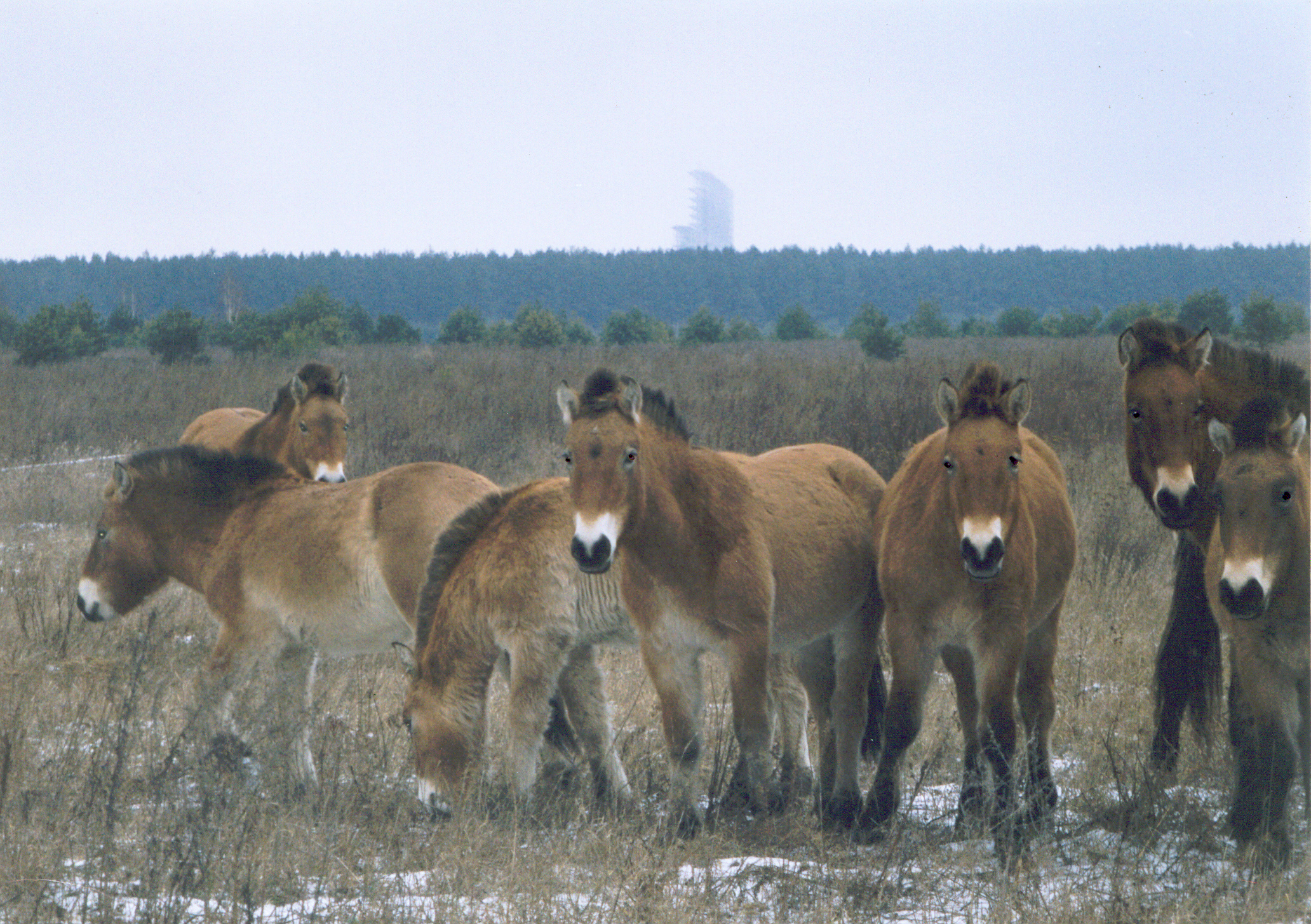
Przewalski's horses in the Chernobyl Exclusion Zone. The Duga radar receiver can be seen in the background.

Cases of mutant deformity in animals of the zone include partial albinism and other external malformations in swallows and insect mutations. A study of several hundred birds belonging to 48 different species also demonstrated that birds inhabiting highly radioactively contaminated areas had smaller brains compared to birds from clean areas.

A reduction in the density and the abundance of animals in highly radioactively contaminated areas has been reported for several taxa, including birds, insects, spiders, and mammals. In birds, which are an efficient bioindicator, a negative correlation has been reported between background radiation and bird species richness. Scientists such as Anders Pape Møller (University of Paris-Sud) and Timothy Mousseau (University of South Carolina) report that birds and smaller animals such as voles may be particularly affected by radioactivity.

Møller is the first author on nine of the 20 most-cited articles relating to the ecology, evolution and non-human biology in the Chernobyl area. However, some of Møller's research has been criticized as flawed. Prior to his work at Chernobyl, Møller was accused of falsifying data in a 1998 paper about asymmetry in oak leaves, which he retracted in 2001. In 2004, the Danish Committees on Scientific Dishonesty (DCSD) reported that Møller was guilty of "scientific dishonesty". The French National Centre for Scientific Research (CNRS) subsequently concluded that there was insufficient evidence to establish either guilt or innocence. Strongly held opinions about Møller and his work have contributed to the difficulty of reaching a scientific consensus on the effects of radiation on wildlife in the Exclusion Zone.

More recently, the populations of large mammals have increased due to a significant reduction of human interference. The populations of traditional Polesian animals (such as the grey wolf, badger, wild boar, roe deer, white-tailed eagle, black stork, western marsh harrier, short-eared owl, red deer, moose, great egret, whooper swan, least weasel, common kestrel, and beaver) have multiplied enormously and begun expanding outside the zone. The zone is considered as a classic example of an involuntary park.

The return of wolves and other animals to the area is being studied by scientists such as Marina Shkvyria (National Academy of Sciences of Ukraine), Sergey Gaschak (Chernobyl Centre in Ukraine), and Jim Beasley (University of Georgia). Camera traps have been installed and are used to record the presence of species. Studies of wolves, which are concentrated in higher-radiation areas near the center of the exclusion zone, may enable researchers to better assess relationships between radiation levels, animal health, and population dynamics.

The area also houses herds of European bison (native to the area) and Przewalski's horses (foreign to the area, as the extinct tarpan was the native wild horse) released there after the accident. Some accounts refer to the reappearance of extremely rare native lynx, and there are videos of brown bears and their cubs, an animal not seen in the area for more than a century. Special game warden units are organized to protect and control them. No scientific study has been conducted on the population dynamics of these species.

The rivers and lakes of the zone pose a significant threat of spreading polluted silt during spring floods. They are systematically secured by dikes.

=== Grass and forest fires ===
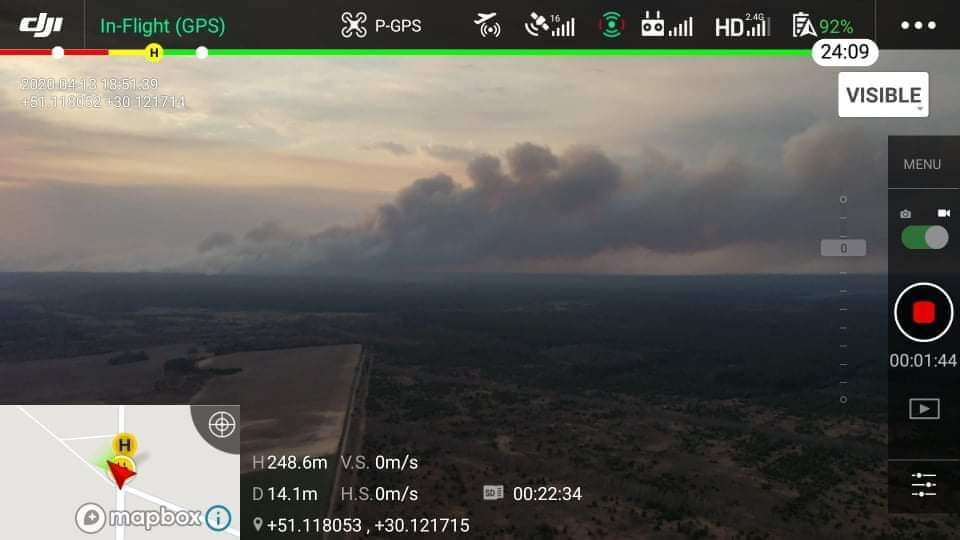
Forest fire on 4 April 2020

It is known that fires can make contamination mobile again. In particular, V.I. Yoschenko et al. reported on the possibility of increased mobility of caesium, strontium, and plutonium due to grass and forest fires. As an experiment, fires were set and the levels of the radioactivity in the air downwind of these fires were measured.

Grass and forest fires have happened inside the contaminated zone, releasing radioactive fallout into the atmosphere. In 1986, a series of fires destroyed 2,336 hectares (5,772 acres) of forest, and several other fires have since burned within the 30 km (19 mi) zone. A serious fire in early May 1992 affected 500 ha (1,240 acres) of land, including 270 ha (670 acres) of forest. This resulted in a great increase in the levels of caesium-137 in airborne dust.

In 2010, a series of wildfires affected contaminated areas, specifically the surroundings of Bryansk and border regions with Belarus and Ukraine. The Russian government claimed that there was no discernible increase in radiation levels, while Greenpeace accused the government of denial.

On 4 April 2020, a fire broke in the Zone on at least 20 hectares of Ukrainian forests. Approximately 90 firefighters were deployed to extinguish the blaze, as well as a helicopter and two aircraft. Radiation is still present in these forests, making firefighting more difficult; authorities stated that there was no danger to the surrounding population. The previous reported fire was in June 2018.

=== Current state of the ecosystem ===
Despite the negative effect of the disaster on human life, many scientists see an overall beneficial effect to the ecosystem. Though the immediate effects of the accident were negative, the area quickly recovered and is today seen as very healthy. The lack of people in the area has increased the biodiversity of the Exclusion Zone in the years since the disaster.

In the aftermath of the disaster, radioactive contamination in the air had a decidedly negative effect on the fauna, vegetation, rivers, lakes, and groundwater of the area. The radiation resulted in deaths among coniferous plants, soil invertebrates, and mammals, as well as a decline in reproductive numbers among both plants and animals.

The surrounding forest was covered in radioactive particles, resulting in the death of 400 hectares of the most immediate pine trees, though radiation damage can be found in an area of tens of thousands of hectares. An additional concern is that as the dead trees in the Red Forest (named for the color of the dead pines) decay, contamination is leaking into the groundwater.

Despite all this, Professor Nick Beresford, an expert on Chernobyl and ecology, said that "the overall effect was positive" for the wildlife in the area.

The impact of radiation on individual animals has not been studied, but cameras in the area have captured evidence of a resurgence of the mammalian population – including rare animals such as the lynx and the vulnerable European bison.

Research on the health of Chernobyl's wildlife is ongoing, and there is concern that the wildlife still suffers from some of the negative effects of the radiation exposure. Though it will be years before researchers collect the necessary data to fully understand the effects, for now, the area is essentially one of Europe's largest nature preserves. Overall, an assessment by plant biochemist Stuart Thompson concluded, "the burden brought by radiation at Chernobyl is less severe than the benefits reaped from humans leaving the area." In fact, the ecosystem around the power plant "supports more life than before".

== Infrastructure ==
The industrial, transport, and residential infrastructure has been largely crumbling since the 1986 evacuation. There are at least 800 known "burial grounds" (Ukrainian singular: mohyl'nyk) for the contaminated vehicles with hundreds of abandoned military vehicles and helicopters. River ships and barges lie in the abandoned port of Chernobyl. The port can easily be seen in satellite images of the area. The Jupiter Factory, one of the largest buildings in the zone, was in use until 1996 but has since been abandoned and its condition is deteriorating.

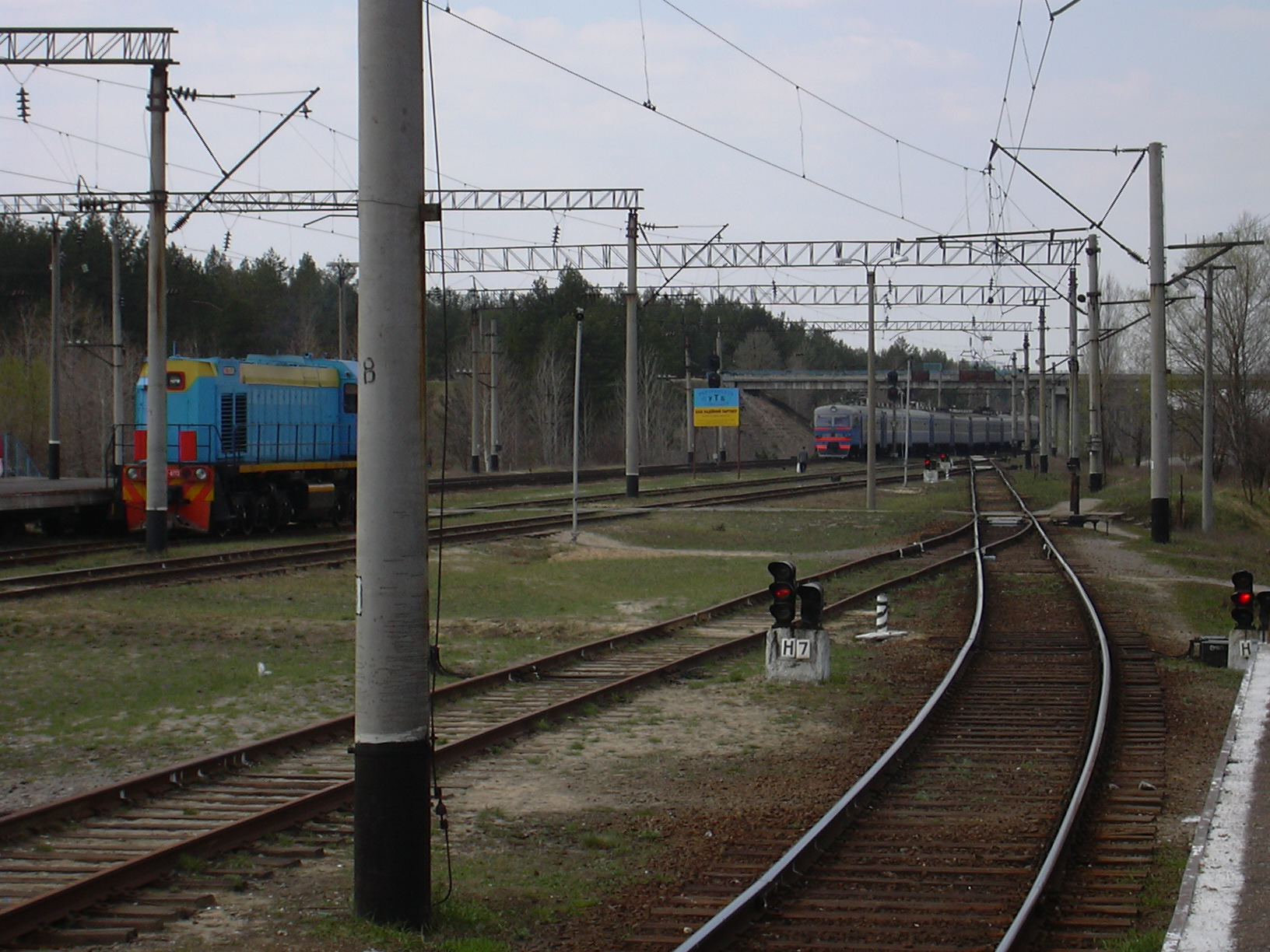
The railway line to the Exclusion Zone at Slavutych station

The infrastructure immediately used by the existing nuclear-related installations is maintained and developed, such as the railway link to the outside world from the Semykhody station used by the power plant.

=== Chernobyl-2 ===
The Chernobyl-2 site (a.k.a. the "Russian Woodpecker") is a former Soviet military installation relatively close to the power plant, consisting of a gigantic transmitter and receiver belonging to the Duga-1 over-the-horizon radar system. Located 2 km (1.2 mi) from the surface area of Chernobyl-2 is a large underground complex that was used for anti-missile defense, space surveillance and communication, and research. Military units were stationed there.

== In popular culture ==
- Immediately after the explosion on 26 April 1986, Russian photographer Igor Kostin photographed and reported on the event, getting the first pictures from the air, then for the next 20 years he continued visiting the area to document the political and personal stories of those impacted by the disaster, publishing a book of photos Chernobyl: confessions of a reporter.
- In 2014, the official video for Pink Floyd's "Marooned" features scenes of the town of Pripyat.
- In an opening scene of the 1998 film Godzilla, the main character, scientist Nick Tatopoulos, is in the Chernobyl Exclusion Zone, researching the effects of environmental radiation on earthworms.
- British photographer John Darwell was among the first foreigners to photograph within the Chernobyl Exclusion Zone for three weeks in late 1999, including in Pripyat, in numerous villages, a landfill site, and people continuing to live within the Zone. This resulted in an exhibition and book Legacy: Photographs inside the Chernobyl Exclusion Zone. Stockport: Dewi Lewis, 2001. ISBN 978-1-899235-58-2. Visits have since been made by numerous other documentary and art photographers.
- In A Good Day to Die Hard, a 2013 American action thriller film, the protagonists steal a car and drive to Pripyat where a safe deposit box with a file is located, only to find many men loading containers into vehicles while instead they are supposed to only get a secret file. The safe deposit box with the supposed file is a secret passage to a Chernobyl-era vault containing €1 billion worth of weapons-grade uranium. It is turned out that there is no secret file and the antagonists have concocted a scheme to steal the uranium deposit to make big money in the black market.
- In a 2014 episode of Top Gear, the hosts were challenged with making their cars run out of fuel before they could reach the Exclusion Zone.
- Jeremy Wade, of the fishing documentary River Monsters, risks his life to catch a river monster that supposedly lives near or in the cooling ponds of the Chernobyl power plant near Pripyat.
- A large fraction of Martin Cruz Smith's 2004 crime novel Wolves Eat Dogs (the fifth in his series starring Russian detective Arkady Renko) is set in the Exclusion Zone.
- The opening scene of the 2005 horror film Return of the Living Dead: Necropolis takes place within Chernobyl, where canisters of the zombie chemical 2-4-5 Trioxin are found to be held.
- The video game franchise S.T.A.L.K.E.R., released in 2007, recreates parts of the zone from source photographs and in-person visits (bridges, railways, buildings, compounds, abandoned vehicles), albeit taking some artistic license regarding the geography of the Zone for gameplay reasons.
- In the 2007 video game Call of Duty 4: Modern Warfare, two missions, i.e. "All Ghillied Up" and "One Shot, One Kill" take place in Pripyat.
- A 2009 episode of Destination Truth depicts Josh Gates and the Destination Truth team exploring the ruins of Pripyat for signs of paranormal activity.
- In 2011, Guillaume Herbaut and Bruno Masi created the web documentary La Zone, funded by CNC, LeMonde.fr and Agat Films. The documentary explores the communities and individuals that still inhabit or visit the Exclusion Zone.
- The PBS program Nature aired on 19 October 2011, its documentary Radioactive Wolves which explores the return to nature which has occurred in the Exclusion Zone among wolves and other wildlife.
- In the 2011 film Transformers: Dark of the Moon, Chernobyl is depicted when the Autobots investigate suspected alien activity.
- 2011: the award-winning short film Seven Years of Winter was filmed under the direction of Marcus Schwenzel in 2011. In his short film the filmmaker tells the drama of the orphan Andrej, which is sent into the nuclear environment by his brother Artjom in order to ransack the abandoned homes. In 2015 the film received the Award for Best Film from the Uranium International Film Festival.
- The 2012 film Chernobyl Diaries is set in the Exclusion Zone. The horror movie follows a tour group that become stranded in Pripyat, and their encounters with creatures mutated by radioactive exposure.
- The 2015 documentary The Russian Woodpecker, which won the Grand Jury Prize for World Documentary at the Sundance Film Festival, has extensive footage from the Chernobyl Exclusion Zone and focuses on a conspiracy theory behind the disaster and the nearby Duga radar installation.
- Markiyan Kamysh's 2015 book, Stalking the Atomic City: Life Among the Decadent and the Depraved of Chornobyl, about illegal pilgrimage in the Chernobyl Exclusion Zone.
- The 2015 documentary The Babushkas Of Chernobyl directed by Anne Bogart and Holly Morris focuses on elderly residents who remain in the Exclusion Zone. These people, a majority of whom are women, are self-sufficient farmers who receive routine visits from officials to check on their health and radiation levels. The film won several awards.
- The five-part HBO miniseries Chernobyl was aired in 2019, dramatizing the events of the explosion and relief efforts after the fact. It was primarily shot in Lithuania.
- In 2019, the Spintires video game released a DLC where players can drive around the Exclusion Zone behind the wheel of a Russian truck to hunt down prize logging sites, while also trying to avoid getting blasted by radiation. The power plant, Pripyat, Red Forest, Kupsta Lake and the Duga Radar have all been recreated, so players can also go on a sightseeing tour from the truck.
- The survival horror video game Chernobylite by The Farm 51 is set in the Chernobyl Exclusion Zone.
- In Chris Tarrant: Extreme Railways Season 5 Episode - "Extreme Nuclear Railway: A Journey Too Far?" (episode 22), Chris Tarrant visits Chernobyl on his journey through Ukraine.
- In 2026, first-person shooter video game Counter-Strike 2 added a map based on the Chernobyl Exclusion Zone, including notable structures such as the Chernobyl Monument and the Pripyat amusement park.

== See also ==
- 2020 Chernobyl Exclusion Zone wildfires
- Effects of the Chernobyl disaster
- List of Chernobyl-related articles
- Polesie State Radioecological Reserve
