= Red Forest =

Forest within the Chernobyl exclusion zone in Ukraine

Red Forest Ukrainian: Рудий ліс Russian: Рыжий лес
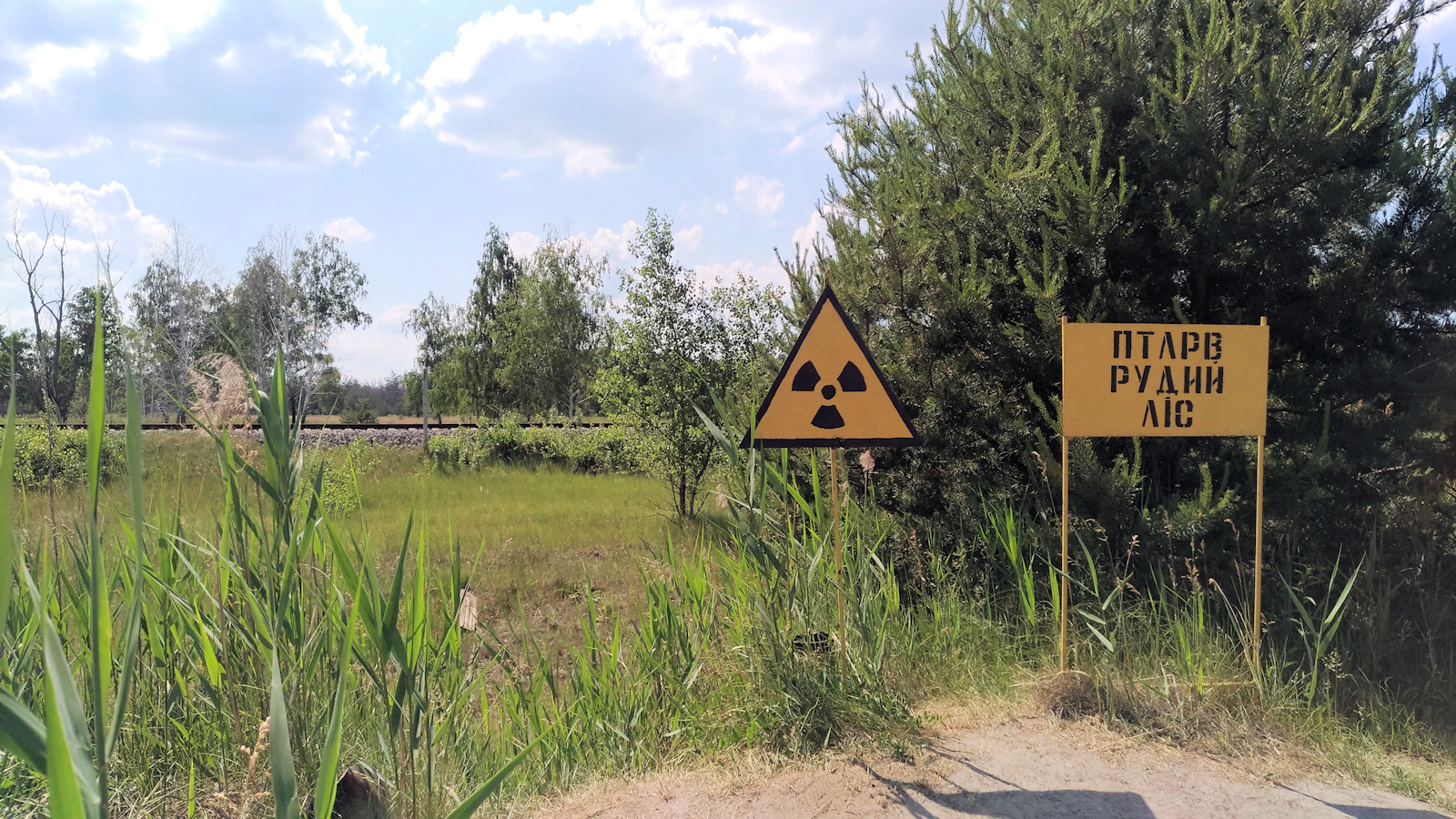
- Radiation signage in the Red Forest

- Location within Kyiv Oblast Location within Ukraine

Geography
- Location: Chernobyl Exclusion Zone, Ukraine
- Coordinates: 51°22′48″N 30°02′57″E

Administration
- Status: State controlled, restricted access
- Visitation: With permission only
- Authority: State Agency of Ukraine on the Exclusion Zone Management

Ecology
- Disturbance: Large amounts of radioactive contamination

The Red Forest (Ukrainian: Рудий ліс, romanized: Rudyi lis; Russian: Рыжий лес, romanized: Ryzhiy les) is the ten-square-kilometre (4 sq mi) area surrounding the Chernobyl Nuclear Power Plant within the exclusion zone, located in Polesia. The name "Red Forest" comes from the ginger-brown colour of the pine trees after they died following the absorption of high levels of ionizing radiation as a consequence of the Chernobyl nuclear disaster on 26 April 1986. The site remains one of the most contaminated areas in the world today.

The trees which were originally dosed by radiation from the disaster were removed by the cleanup crews; consequently, all trees visible there today are relatively young and were not directly irradiated. The young forest is now home to a wide variety of wildlife including "red deer, roe deer, wild boar, moose, horse, bison, brown bear, lynx, wolves, two species of hare, beaver, otter, badger, some martins, some mink, and polecats" which have thrived in the area due to the lack of human activity.

== Disaster and cleanup ==
The Red Forest is located in the zone of alienation; this area received the highest doses of radiation from the Chernobyl disaster and the resulting clouds of smoke and dust, heavily polluted with radioactive contamination. The trees died from this radiation. The explosion and fire at the Chernobyl No. 4 reactor contaminated the soil, water and atmosphere with radioactive material equivalent to that of 20 times the atomic bombings of Hiroshima and Nagasaki.

In the post-disaster cleanup operations, a majority of the pine trees were bulldozed and buried in trenches by the "liquidators". The trenches were then covered with a thick carpet of sand and planted with pine saplings. Many fear that as the trees decay, radioactive contaminants will leach into the ground water. People have evacuated the contaminated zone around the Red Forest.

== Wildlife refuge ==
Map showing caesium-137 contamination in Belarus, Russia, and Ukraine as of 1996

As humans were evacuated from the area in 1986, animals moved in despite the radiation. The flora and fauna of the Red Forest have been dramatically affected by the accident. It seems that the biodiversity of the Red Forest has increased in the years following the disaster. There are reports of stunted plants in the area. Wild boar multiplied eightfold between 1986 and 1988.

The site of the Red Forest remains one of the most contaminated areas in the world. However, it has proved to be an astonishingly fertile habitat for many endangered species. The evacuation of the area surrounding the nuclear reactor has created a lush and unique wildlife refuge. In the 1996 BBC Horizon documentary "Inside Chernobyl's Sarcophagus", birds are seen flying in and out of large holes in the structure of the former nuclear reactor. The long-term impact of the fallout on the flora and fauna of the region is not fully known, as plants and animals have significantly different and varying radiologic tolerance. Some birds are reported with stunted tail feathers (which interferes with breeding). Storks, wolves, beavers, deer, and eagles have been reported in the area.

In 2005, radiation levels in the Red Forest were in some places as high as 10 mSv/h. More than 90% of the radioactivity of the Red Forest was concentrated in the soil.

The nature of the area seems to have not only survived, but flourished due to significant reduction of human impact. The zone has become a "Radiological Reserve", a classic example of an involuntary park. Currently, there is concern about contamination of the soil with strontium-90 and caesium-137, which have half-lives of about 30 years. The highest levels of caesium-137 are found in the surface layers of the soil where they are absorbed by plants and insects living there today. Some scientists fear that radioactivity will affect the land for the next several generations.

== Wildfires ==
In April 2015, a large forest fire burning nearly 400 ha (990 acres) came within 20 km (12 mi) of the abandoned nuclear power plant, raising fears the flames would burn shrub and woodland surrounding the disaster zone, which could have released radioactive material into the atmosphere. The forest was ravaged again by another wildfire in April 2020 that caused an unknown amount of damage.

A study published in 2014 found that plant matter – leaf litter and trunks of dead trees – in the Red Forest area decays at a far slower rate than is typical for forest detritus. The researchers found that microorganisms responsible for decomposing forest litter do not act on such matter within the contaminated zone at nearly the rate seen in forests outside the zone. As a result, the amount of detritus – the major fuel of wildfires – is significantly larger than in other forests. Fire risks are therefore elevated compared with those in other forests with similar climatic conditions.

== Human activity ==
In February 2022, during the Russian invasion of Ukraine, Russian forces reportedly moved vehicles through the Red Forest, using it as a route for their convoys, which kicked up clouds of radioactive dust from the forest. Local workers reported the Russian troops moving through the Red Forest were not using protective suits and could have potentially endangered themselves. During their occupation of the forest, troops also reportedly shot and consumed wild animals living in the area and fished for Wels catfish living in abandoned cooling ponds for the power plant, likely ingesting radioactive materials in the process.

On 31 March 2022, it was reported that most of the Russian troops occupying Chernobyl were forced to pull back after suffering from radiation sickness caused by digging trenches in the heavily contaminated Red Forest. There has not been independent confirmation that the pull-back was caused by radiation sickness, but Ukrainian officials have provided access to the site which shows considerable trenches and digging in the Red Forest.

On 1 April 2022, The Daily Telegraph reported that one Russian soldier died from acute radiation sickness after being camped in the Red Forest for a prolonged time. In October, CNN cited a social media post claiming that injured Russian soldiers who operated in Chernobyl had been treated at the Republican Research Center for Radiation Medicine and Human Ecology in Belarus, including some who showed signs of radiation poisoning.

The IAEA's Second Summary Report, published in September 2022, clarified that only modest radiation doses (0.6 mSv) could have resulted from such activities. Later, the Washington Post quoted a tour guide in the Zone who acknowledged that he had started the radiation sickness rumors as a "huge exaggeration" meant to terrify the Russians.

== In popular culture ==
The 2004 novel Wolves Eat Dogs by Martin Cruz Smith, in the series featuring the Russian police inspector Arkady Renko, is partly set in the Red Forest near Chernobyl.

The first-person shooter and survival horror videogames S.T.A.L.K.E.R.: Shadow of Chernobyl (2007), S.T.A.L.K.E.R.: Clear Sky (2008) , S.T.A.L.K.E.R.: Call of Pripyat (2009), and S.T.A.L.K.E.R. 2: Heart of Chornobyl (2024), developed by the Ukrainian video game studio GSC Game World, are set in a semi-post-apocalyptic and sci-fi version of the Chernobyl exclusion zone. All four games feature the Red Forest as part of their game world.

In 2023, the 20th season of table top role play series Dimension 20, titled Burrow's End, was centred around a family of stoats surviving in a forest inspired by the Red Forest.

Chernobylite features parts of the Red Forest.

Viewers can see the creation of the Red Forest in first episode of the miniseries Chernobyl.

== See also ==
- Bellesrad
- Chernobyl liquidators
- Comparison of Chernobyl and other radioactivity releases
- Effects of the Chernobyl disaster
- List of civilian nuclear accidents
- List of individual trees
- List of Chernobyl-related articles
- Nuclear and radiation accidents and incidents
- Zone of alienation
- Zone Rouge
