= Kostino =

Kostino may refer to:

- Kostino, Bulgaria, a populated place in Kardzhali Municipality of Kardzhali Province, Bulgaria
- Kostino, alternative spelling of the former name of Karydia, Pella, a village in northern Greece
- Kostino, Russia, several rural localities in Russia
