= Monument to Those Who Saved the World =

1986 Chernobyl disaster monument, Ukraine

Coordinates: 51°16′50″N 30°12′30″E

Monument to Those Who Saved the World (Ukrainian: Пам'ятник «Тим, хто врятував світ») is a monument in Chernobyl, Ukraine, to the firefighters who died putting out the fire at the Chernobyl Nuclear Power Plant in 1986 after the catastrophic nuclear accident there. The monument is also dedicated to the Chernobyl liquidators who cleaned up after the accident.
