= Igor Kostin =

Soviet-Ukrainian photographer (1936–2015)

- Ігор Костін
- Born: 27 December 1936; Bessarabia, Romania
- Died: 9 June 2015 (aged 78); Kyiv, Ukraine
- Occupation: Photographer

Igor Fedorovich Kostin (Ukrainian: Ігор Костін; 27 December 1936 – 9 June 2015) was one of the five photographers in the world to take pictures of the Chernobyl nuclear disaster near Pripyat in Ukraine, on 26 April 1986. He was working for Novosti Press Agency (APN) as a photographer in Kyiv, Ukraine, when he represented Novosti to cover the nuclear accident in Chernobyl. Kostin's aerial view of the Chernobyl nuclear power plant was widely published around the world, showing the extent of the devastation, and triggering fear throughout the world of radioactivity contamination the accident caused, when the Soviet media was working to censor information regarding the accident, releasing limited information regarding the accident on 28 April 1986, until the Soviet Union's collapse in 1991.

He had captured the ongoing problems with contamination suffered by human beings and animals. His photos reportedly include those of the many animals born with deformities in the Chernobyl area, from his many incursions into the Zone of alienation to bring the problems to the attention of the world. Kostin died in Kyiv in 2015 at the age of 78 in a car accident. He was married to Alla Kostin.

== Early life ==
Kostin was born in Bessarabia, in Romania (present day in Moldova), on 27 December 1936, three years before his father, Féodor Kostin, an economist working in a bank, was sent to fight the war for the newly created Moldavian SSR, after Greater Romania was forced to cede Bessarabia to the Soviet Union under the Molotov–Ribbentrop Pact. Before the cession, the Kostin family relocated to Kishinev, Moldavian ASSR (present day the capital city of Moldova, Chişinău). They subsequently resided in the suburb of Kishinev for the next thirty-two years, when his father was sent to the war.

From June 1941 onward, under German and Romanian occupation, Kostin was forced to feed on leftovers disposed by the Germans and better off Moldavians with his mother, Nadejda Popovitch, since his father was the sole breadwinner in the family, and there was widespread famine during the occupation. He and his mother frequently transported food such as borscht illegally to the German concentration camps around Kishinev for the Soviet prisoners of war. It was later revealed by Kostin in his photographic book that his mother hoped to find his father in the camps, only to realise later that his father was killed during a bombing years later.

In August 1944, the Soviet Union re-established control over Moldavia, and drove the German and Romanian forces out of Moldavian SSR. The entrance of Soviet forces was ushered by aerial bombardment, and almost killed the Kostins, when a bomb obliterated their residence, when they hid under a bed. They later hid near a German armored vehicle, until Soviet forces entered the city.

The Soviet Union began purging native Moldavians, and sending richer farmers and the intelligentsia to concentration camps in Siberia. Private business operations became illegal, and Kostin's mother operated a small family business, at the risk of being exposed to the officials by neighbors. In the mornings the Kostins would wake up to the clamor of some of their neighbors packing up and being deported. It was at this point of time that Kostin turned into a gangster and lost interests in schooling. His early life turned into a game of survival of the fittest. Most people were preoccupied with obtaining the basic necessities of life.

In 1954, he began military service as a degenerated athletic youth in the army, where he was reformed and became a sapper. He revealed that on at least one occasion he was instructed to dig trenches along the Soviet border in anticipation of an American invasion. By the end of his service he grew more insubordinate and went absent without official leave adding seven months of military jail term to his three-year military service. His deputy commander assigned him the task of redecorating the "Leninrooms"—political meeting rooms of the barracks. His jail term was immediately commuted upon the completion of the job.

== Career as a sportsman and engineer ==
In 1959, upon being discharged from the army, Kostin began playing volleyball for Kishinev's regional sporting team. He then moved up the ladder to play for the Moldavian SSR team, subsequently becoming part of the Soviet national team, representing the union in international basketball competitions. In 1969, his sporting career ended with multiple spinal and knee injuries and complications from negligence of medical treatments. He began studying at the Agronomy Institute of Kishinev, and was employed as Senior Engineer for a construction firm in Kishinev. It was then he received a job offer at the Construction Bureau of Kyiv, in Ukraine.

In Kyiv, they pioneered a construction framing method that expedited building construction, and Kostin invented a machine for the method, which he was awarded prizes for. He was then promoted to Chief of Construction, and managed a staff of around 50 people. His wife at that time, Galina, who was also an engineer, helped him to discover and pursue his natural talent in photography through many sleepless nights developing and printing the analog images in Kyiv, which eventually won him praise at the international photo exhibitions.

== Career as a photographer ==
By the mid-1970s, Kostin had lost most interest in the construction industry, and was frustrated with the low fixed salary. He professed that he enjoyed photography, specifically portraitures, and won a gold medal for a portrait of his wife in Kyiv's annual photographic exhibition. He had subsequently entered into at least 80 such exhibitions and photographic road-shows throughout the world. Kostin's career as an amateur photographer earned him more than twice the amount of salary than his career as Chief of Construction in the Construction Bureau of Kyiv.

He was then employed in one of Ukraine's TV stations as a copywriter. He was subsequently made an anchor for a monthly photographic programme, where he interviewed some of most accomplished photographers around the world. He was simultaneously employed as the Chief of Construction, effectively holding two formal careers. A year and half later, the show was canceled, and he attempted to apply for a placing at Novosti Press Agency (APN) in Moscow, Russian SFSR. He was however, rejected by Galina Pleskova, then Editor-in-Chief for the agency.

Kostin effectively ended his engineering career when he returned to Kyiv where he resorted to sleeping in the streets to pursue his photographic career. The Kyiv branch of APN agreed to permit him the use of their photographic development labs. The labs became his temporary abode for around five years after which he was employed as war reporter for Novosti.

Kostin covered some of the most severe third-world wars where the Soviet Union was involved, such as in Vietnam War and Soviet intervention in Afghanistan, where he fielded as a non-Communist Party affiliated reporter for Novosti. Due to the fact of non-alignment, he was restricted from entering the front-lines.

== At Chernobyl ==
After returning from Afghanistan, he began to work periodically for Novosti from the Kyiv branch. He reported on local and trans-Soviet matters but rarely left the state. On the late evening of 26 April 1986 a helicopter pilot whom he worked closely with for his journalistic activities alerted him that there had been a fire at the nuclear power plant in Chernobyl. The fire had been extinguished by the time they arrived at Chernobyl via helicopter, and witnessed a war-like scramble of military vehicles and power plant personnel down at the scene of the nuclear power plant. He also experienced an odd feeling combined with high temperature and toxic smog, that was unusual for an accident scene. The motors of his cameras began to exhibit symptoms of radioactive-caused degradation after around 20 shots. The helicopter returned to Kyiv after the cameras' failure.

Kostin managed to develop the rolls of film, only to realise that all but one was unsalvageable - most of the rolls were affected by the high level of radiation, that caused the photographs to appear entirely black, resembling a film that was exposed to light pre-maturely. Kostin's only photograph of the nuclear power plant was sent to Novosti in Moscow, but he did not receive a permit to publish it until 5 May 1986. His visit to Chernobyl was illegal and not sanctioned by the authorities. Pravda published limited information about the accident on 29 April 1986, but did not publish Kostin's photographs.

Before Kostin received permission to photograph Chernobyl, he covered the evacuation of Pripyat, the closest town to the nuclear power plant. Residents were given less than two hours to leave, and were told to bring only a few personal belongings as they were advised they would be able to return shortly, although this was not the case.

It was then that he covered the mass exodus of inhabitants of Pripyat and 30 km zone surrounding the nuclear power plant, before the 1 May Labour Day celebration. Dozens had died from the accident, mostly workers at the nuclear power plant.

The accident was interpreted as a major catastrophe by the global news media, even when the Ukrainian and Soviet authorities were trying to suppress any news regarding the accident. Kostin later received permits as one of the representatives of the five accredited Soviet media outlets to cover the accident site and the Zone of Alienation. On 5 May, 1986, he ventured into the rubble of the Chernobyl nuclear plant site and Reactor 4 along with the liquidators. He would return multiple times in an attempt to document as much of Chernobyl as possible—and he acknowledged in interviews that his commitment to documenting the Chernobyl disaster had become a personal obsession. Analysts of Kostin's Chernobyl work have described it in part as an inexplicable drive toward his own self-destruction; some scholars have speculated that Kostin was motivated on an unconscious level by a combination of the death drive and archive fever.

Kostin would return repeatedly to Chernobyl for a decade to cover the cleanup efforts. He would return to capture his final photo in March 1996, later publishing his book, Chernobyl: Confessions of a Reporter, which included his photographs spanning the period from April 1986 to March 1996.

== Photographic style ==
Kostin's photographs have often been described as unambiguous, straightforward, and simple for viewers to interpret. Andrea Zink, who characterizes Igor Kostin's work within the broader context of textual and photographic representations of Chernobyl, describes his images as primarily factual in nature. Kostin's photography features subjects whose purpose is clear, which include a sign warning of high radiation, a procession of vehicles evacuating local citizens, a damaged reactor at the Chernobyl nuclear power plant. This style contrasts with photographs taken by Robert Polidori, a contemporary Canadian photographer known for presenting cryptic scenes with little explanation. This might suggest that Kostin was primarily motivated by the pursuit of documenting the truth, striving simply to reproduce the events he witnessed while making as few alterations to his images as possible.

In contrast to interpretations of Kostin as a pure documentarist, Eva Castringius argues that Kostin incorporated a degree of creative editing in his work. Castringius calls attention to the fact that, while Kostin strove to capture an accurate record of Chernobyl, he was not afraid to alter his photographs within the appropriate journalistic standards in order to emphasize their contents. For example, imperfections in one of his earlier images, which exist as a direct consequence of radiation exposure, appear more intense than reality because Kostin intentionally increased the contrast when developing this photo.
