= National Commission for Radiation Protection of Ukraine =

official website

The National Commission for Radiation Protection of Ukraine (NCRPU) is a permanent independent collegial supreme scientific expert advisory and consultative body to the Verkhovna Rada (Ukrainian parliament) on matters of radiation protection and radiation safety of Ukraine. Its composition is being coordinated through the National Academy of Sciences of Ukraine.

Composition and regulations of the commission along with its president are confirmed by the Verkhovna Rada on proposition of the parliamentary committee on issues of ecological policy and natural resources. Composition and candidacy of the director is approved by the National Academy of Sciences of Ukraine.

== Goals ==
The main goal of NCRPU is to define common principles and criteria for radiation protection of human life and health from adverse effects of ionizing radiation.

== Guidelines ==
In its activities NCRPU follows the Constitution of Ukraine, acts of the President and Cabinet of Ministers of Ukraine, the Concept of radiation protection of the population of Ukraine in connection with the Chornobyl catastrophe, the laws of Ukraine «On protection from the effects of ionizing radiation», «On use of nuclear energy and radiation safety», «On legal regime of territories affected by radioactive contamination following the Chornobyl catastrophe», «On the status and social protection of citizens affected by the Chornobyl catastrophe», other regulations and NCRPU's Statute.

In addition, NCRPU is based in its activity on recommendations and conclusions of international organizations of which Ukraine is a member and/or with whom it has agreements on cooperation in assessing the impact of ionizing radiation on human health and on radiation protection of the public.

== Activities ==
Under its determined authority and competence, NCRPU:

- Is involved in developing and shaping national policy on state regulation of nuclear and radiation safety, radioactive materials (substances) and radioactive waste management, development and implementation in Ukraine of basic concepts, principles, rules, regulations, standards and measures of radiation protection of human, recommendations to reduce the impact of the radiation factor and of economic and social consequences of exposure to ionizing radiation on public health, as well as in creating a system of legal, socio-economic and institutional measures to ensure radiation protection and the protection of life and health of the public of Ukraine.
- Develops guidelines and ways to solve comprehensive scientific, technical, economic and social problems in the field of radiation protection.
- Coordinates the science-based permissible levels (norms) of radioactive contamination of the environment, concentration of radioactive substances in food and agricultural products, air, soil and water, as well as measures to limit impact of natural, industrial, medical and consumer exposure to human.
- Defines the criteria for zoning of radioactive contamination and develops proposals for of radiation protection measures for the public, the personnel, and the environment in these areas.
- Provides scientific and expert analysis of draft laws and other regulations in the field of radiation protection and radiation safety of the public, examination of construction plans of nuclear power companies, businesses that use ionizing radiation sources and facilities for radioactive waste management, of programs for use of spent nuclear fuel and ionizing radiation sources and their disposal, takes part in environmental impact assessment of these facilities.
- Gives advice on key areas of action in radiation accidents, regulatory and procedural documentation for overcoming the consequences of radiation accidents.
- Is involved in the creation of database management systems of radiation safety, of radiation and environmental situation in Ukraine, of exposure levels, of health of public and personnel involved in use of nuclear energy.

== History ==
The National Commission for Radiation Protection of Ukraine was established by Decree of the Parliament of Ukraine (Verkhovna Rada) No. 95 of August 1, 1990, in accordance with the Declaration on State Sovereignty of Ukraine of July 16, 1990 to provide science-based approach to solving the problems of radiation protection, taking into account regional characteristics of the republic, increased participation in international cooperation on these issues. By resolutions of the Presidium of the Verkhovna Rada of Ukraine No. 791-XII of February 28, 1991 and No. 1461-XII of August 30, 1991 it was approved the Provisional Regulations on the NCRPU and its personal membership. Resolution of the Cabinet of Ministers of Ukraine No. 751-R of 16 November 1992 identified structure, staffing and logistical support NCRPU.

Verkhovna Rada elected an outstanding scientist, academician of the National Academy of Sciences, Doctor of Biological Sciences, Professor Grodzinsky Dmytro Mykhailovych as the first Chairman of NCRPU (decree No. 798-XII of February 28, 1991).

Verkhovna Rada of Ukraine by its decree No. 675-XIV of May 19, 1999 approved the permanent Regulations of NCRPU and by Resolution No. 1530-III of 2 March 2000 a new NCRPU's personal membership accounting 30 members, including 8 academicians and corresponding members of the National Academy of Sciences of Ukraine and National Academy of Medical Sciences of Ukraine, 20 doctors of sciences.

In April 2009 Verkhovna Rada of Ukraine has defined its powers in the field of radiation protection, supplementing the Law of Ukraine «On protection from the effects of ionizing radiation» by Article No. 8-1, according to which the Regulations and personal membership of NCRPU are approved by the Verkhovna Rada. In 2009 pursuant to this provision of the Law, the Verkhovna Rada of Ukraine approved the new NCRPU's Regulations (Decree of the Verkhovna Rada of Ukraine No. 1630-VI of October 6, 2009). By the same decree Skubenko Volodymyr Petrovych was approved the Head of NCRPU.

By Resolution of the Verkhovna Rada of Ukraine «On the number of members and personal membership of the National Commission for Radiation Protection of Ukraine» of December 23, 2009, No. 1791-VI new 45 members, including 11 academicians and 6 members of the National Academies of Sciences of Ukraine, as well as 38 doctors and 5 PhDs, were approved.

== Commission structure ==
On April 15, 2010, at its meeting, NCRPU established committees (and working bodies) and approved by their personal membership.

Committee	Name of Committee	Chairman of the Committee
I	Committee for comprehensive safety analysis of nuclear and radiation technologies that are being implemented, designed, and transported to the territory of Ukraine	Ivan Vishnevsky, National Academy of Sciences of Ukraine, Doctor of Physical and Mathematical Sciences, Professor
II	Committee for comprehensive analysis of the biological effects of ionizing radiation on humans and the environment in application of nuclear and radiation technologies in medical and scientific institutions	Vasily Chekhun, academic National Academy of Sciences of Ukraine, MD,
III	Committee for comprehensive analysis of problems associated with the Chornobyl catastrophe	Victoria Tal'ko, MD, Professor
IV	Committee for comprehensive safety analysis of mining and processing industry, radioactive waste and their impact on the public and the environment	George Lisichenko, a member of the National Academy of Sciences of Ukraine, Doctor of Technical Sciences, Senior Scientific Researcher
V	Committee for comprehensive analysis and determination of criteria for establishing the zones of radioactive contamination and development of proposals for radiation protection of the public, the personnel and the environment in these areas	Valery Kashparov, Doctor of Biological Science
VI	Committee for systemic scientific and expert analysis of draft legal acts in the field of radiation protection of the public, nuclear and radiation safety	Olexander Kopylenko, a member of the National Academy of Sciences of Ukraine, academician of the National Academy of Legal Sciences of Ukraine, Doctor of Law, Professor
VII	Committee for comprehensive analysis of international and national norms and standards for radiation safety and dosimetry and their adaptation to Ukrainian legislation	Illya Likhtariov, Doctor of Physical and Mathematical Sciences, Professor, an ICRP member
