= Aleksandra Kulicheva =

Russian basketball player

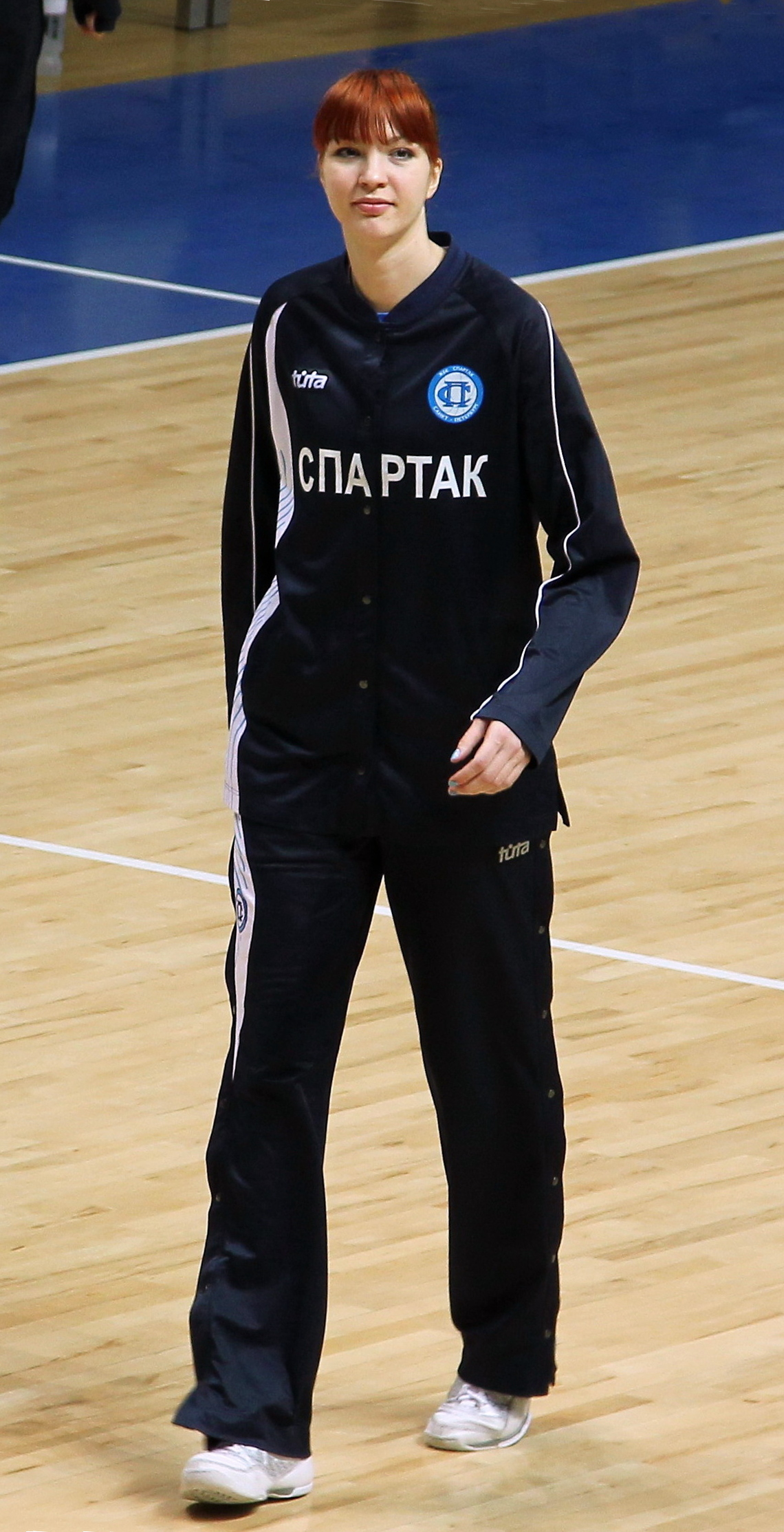
- Kulicheva in 2012

Personal information
- Born: 14 May 1987 (age 39) Saint Petersburg, Russia
- Height: 191 cm (6 ft 3 in)

Sport
- Sport: Basketball
- Club: WBC Spartak Saint Petersburg (2011–12); Dynamo Moscow (2012–13); WBC Dynamo Novosibirsk (2013–14); Nadezhda Orenburg (2014–15); Dynamo Moscow (2015–)

Aleksandra Nikolayevna Kulicheva (also Kostina, Russian: Александра Николаевна Куличева (Костина), born 14 May 1987) is a Russian basketball center. Between 2010 and 2013 she played as Kostina and won the 2013 EuroCup with Dynamo Moscow.
