= Maria Kostina =

Russian golfer

Maria Alexandrovna Kostina (born 25 June 1983) is a Russian golfer. In July 2007 she became the first Russian, male or female, to play in a major golf championship by participating in the U.S. Women's Open.

Kostina was the Russian Amateur Champion twice. She was educated at the Russian State Academy of Physical Education before attending Washington State University in the United States, where she majored in psychology and played college golf. She turned professional in 2006 and is a member of the Futures Tour.
