= Kostina, Bolshezhirovsky selsovet, Fatezhsky District, Kursk Oblast =

Rural locality in Kursk Oblast, Russia

Kostina Костина
- Khutor
- Interactive map of Kostina
- Location of Kostina Kostina (Kursk Oblast)
- Coordinates: 51°52′39″N 35°44′38″E
- Country: Russia
- Federal subject: Kursk Oblast
- Administrative district: Fatezhsky District
- SelsovietSelsoviet: Bolshezhirovsky

Population (2010 Census)
  - Total: 10
  - Estimate (2010): 10 (0%)

Municipal status
  - Municipal district: Fatezhsky Municipal District
  - Rural settlement: Bolshezhirovsky Selsoviet Rural Settlement
- Time zone: UTC+3 (MSK)
- Postal code: 307113
- Dialing code: +7 47144
- OKTMO ID: 38644412201
- Website: мобольшежировский.рф

Kostina (Russian: Костина) is a rural locality (a khutor) in Bolshezhirovsky Selsoviet Rural Settlement, Fatezhsky District, Kursk Oblast, Russia. Population: 10 (2010 census); 20 (2002 census);

== Geography ==
The khutor is located on the Gryaznaya Rudka Brook (a right tributary of the Ruda in the basin of the Svapa), 83.5 km from the Russia–Ukraine border, 35 km north-west of Kursk, 24.5 km south-west of the district center – the town Fatezh, 18 km from the selsoviet center – Bolshoye Zhirovo.

Climate

Kostina has a warm-summer humid continental climate (Dfb in the Köppen climate classification).

== Transport ==
Kostina is located 18 km from the federal route M-2 Crimea Highway as part of the European route E105, 23.5 km from the road of regional importance 38K-017 (Kursk – Lgov – Rylsk – border with Ukraine) as part of the European route E38, 4.5 km from the road of intermunicipal significance 38H-221 (M2 "Crimea Highway" – Kromskaya), 25 km from the nearest railway halt 433 km (railway line Lgov I — Kursk).

The rural locality is situated 39.5 km from Kursk Vostochny Airport, 148 km from Belgorod International Airport and 240 km from Voronezh Peter the Great Airport.
