= Cultural impact of the Chernobyl disaster =

The Chernobyl disaster, when Reactor No. 4 of the Chernobyl Nuclear Power Plant exploded on 26 April 1986, is the worst nuclear disaster and the costliest disaster to have occurred in human history. The effects of the Chernobyl disaster, brought about by the radioactive contamination that chiefly spread throughout the Soviet Union and virtually all of Europe, have had a significant impact on millions of people (in addition to direct and indirect deaths) and the environment, consequently serving as one of the greatest motivators for the anti-nuclear movement. Accordingly, both the incident itself and the aftermath have since been a prominent focus in the study and implementation of nuclear power around the world, and have also featured in numerous works of popular culture; film, literature, music, television, and video games, among other forms of arts and media, have either analyzed it in a non-fictional context or used it as a backdrop for fictional dystopian settings.

== Overview ==
The name "Chernobyl" has become synonymous with the concept of a nuclear energy disaster. Referencing the political damage from the inept initial response to the disaster, pundits sometimes use the phrase "Chernobyl moment" to describe alleged analogous damaging failures, such as responses to the COVID-19 pandemic. Ukraine has announced an intention to open the disaster area to tourism. Numerous cultural works have referenced the disaster, some of which are listed in this article.

== Film ==
=== Documentaries ===
- The Bell of Chernobyl (1987), a documentary film directed by Ukrainian filmmaker, Rollan Sergienko.
- Black Wind White Land (1993), a documentary film exploring the disaster and its consequences for the people of Belarus, Russia, and Ukraine.
- Ljudmila's Voice (2001) tells the story of Ljudmila Ignatenko and her husband Vasilij who was a firefighter responding to Chernobyl.
- Chernobyl Heart (2003), a documentary film observing the effects of the disaster on the health of children in the area.
- Surviving Disaster: Chernobyl Nuclear Disaster (2006), a BBC docudrama about the events at the Chernobyl plant during the accident and its immediate aftermath, focusing on the role of Valery Legasov.
- The Battle of Chernobyl (2006), a documentary with live footage at the time of the situation in Pripyat and the powerplant.
- Heavy Water: A Film for Chernobyl (2006), released by Seventh Art Productions to commemorate the disaster through poetry and first-hand accounts. The film aired at film festivals and on TV, internationally, securing Best Short Documentary at Cinequest Film Festival and the Rhode Island “best score” award, with a screening at Tate Modern.
- The Unnamed Zone (2006), a Spanish documentary film about three young Ukrainian children directly affected by the disaster.
- White Horse (2008), a short documentary about a man returning to his Ukraine home for the first time in 20 years.
- Klitschko (2011), a documentary about the World Heavyweight Champions Vitali Klitschko and Wladimir Klitschko, which makes reference to their late father Wladimir Rodanovich Klitschko, a senior ranking Red Air Force officer was involved in the cleanup operation following the disaster who died in 2011.
- The Russian Woodpecker (2015), a documentary film that investigates the events leading to the Chernobyl disaster.
- Babushkas Of Chernobyl (2017), a documentary directed by Holly Morris exploring the daily lives of elderly women who live and farm in the Exclusion Zone.
- Back to Chernobyl (2020), a documentary by Roman Shumunov
- Chernobyl: The Lost Tapes (2022), directed by James Jones, contains interviews with people who were there and newly discovered footage filmed at the plant by cameramen who worked alongside those who cleaned up the disaster.

=== Others ===
- Decay (1990 film) (1990), a Soviet feature film about the accident and its consequences, the title referring to its main theme of disintegration of human relationships—personal and public.
- Chernobyl: The Final Warning (1991), explores the disaster.
- Star Trek VI: The Undiscovered Country (1991) begins with the exploding moon Praxis of the home world of the Klingon Empire, itself an analog of the Soviet Union since Star Trek: The Original Series.
- In the film Naked (1993), starring David Thewlis, the eccentric protagonist Johnny quotes the Book of Revelation and remarks that the Russian translation of Chernobyl is "wormwood". This quote is also used as a sample in the album Orblivion (1997).
- The Japanese animator Hayao Miyazaki wrote and directed On Your Mark (1995), a music video for Japanese pop duo Chage and Aska. This was essentially an animated music video lasting almost seven minutes. The opening scene shows a clean, old-fashioned, and apparently deserted small village which is dominated by a huge, asymmetrical version of the Chernobyl "sarcophagus". In a 1995 interview in Animage magazine, Miyazaki compared the sarcophagus in the video to Chernobyl, noting the survival of plant life.
- In the 1998 Godzilla film, the character Niko Tatopoulos visits the site of Chernobyl to analyze mutations on earthworms in the area of the meltdown.
- In the comedy film Deuce Bigalow: European Gigolo (2005), the character Deuce Bigalow meets Svetlana, a woman who was born in Chernobyl, and, as a result of the disaster, has a penis instead of a nose.
- The action film Universal Soldier: Regeneration (2009) revolves around terrorists seizing control of Chernobyl and threatening to expose the reactor.
- In the time travel comedy film Hot Tub Time Machine (2010), the hot tub is converted to a time machine when an illegal Russian energy drink, "Chernobly", is spilled on its controls. The protagonists are transported to 1986, several weeks before the real-life Chernobyl disaster.
- The Russian-Ukrainian-German co-produced film В субботу (2011; international title Innocent Saturday) dramatizes the events in the town of Pripyat during the hours and days after the disaster, before the Soviet authorities decided to evacuate. The film was entered into the 61st Berlin International Film Festival.
- In the film Transformers: Dark of the Moon (2011), the Autobots and NEST travel to Chernobyl to retrieve ancient Cybertronian technology (initially, they were supposed to discover the source of a radiation leak). However, once it is retrieved Shockwave suddenly appears and ravages the plant along with a worm-like Decepticon named Driller.
- The horror film Chernobyl Diaries (2012) revolves around a group of college students who take an extreme tour into Pripyat, only to find themselves being stalked and hunted by a group of mysterious creatures.
- The final 20 minutes in the fifth film of the Die Hard series, A Good Day to Die Hard (2013), are set in Chernobyl.
- In the film Fast & Furious Presents: Hobbs and Shaw (2019), the main antagonistic faction Eteon's biotech and weapons facility is located inside the Chernobyl nuclear power plant, and soon after Luke Hobbs, Deckard Shaw, and Hattie Shaw drive a damaged truck into Pripyat.
- Chernobyl: Abyss (2021), a Russian film directed by and starring Danila Kozlovsky, centers on a fictionalized firefighter who becomes a liquidator.

== Literature ==
- The disaster is the plot-driving device in the Marvel Comics miniseries Meltdown (1988), featuring Wolverine and Havok.
- The novel Party Headquarters by the Bulgarian author Georgi Tenev deals with Chernobyl's impact on the integrity of the former Communist bloc in the late 1980s. A large episode of the book is set as an exchange of letters between the protagonist and "little unknown Soviet and Ukrainian comrade" describing the catastrophe.
- The Gesellschaft für deutsche Sprache chose the term Chernobyl (German: Tschernobyl) as German Word of the Year 1986.
- Christa Wolf's 1987 novel Accident (German: Störfall) narrates, from the perspective of a female first-person narrator, the thoughts and events of the day on which the news about the Chernobyl accident have reached her and amounts to a criticism of utopian visions that ignore the human side of social progress.
- Frederik Pohl's novel Chernobyl (1987) relates the disaster from the viewpoint of individuals involved in it.
- Voices from Chernobyl, a non-fiction book by Svetlana Alexievich.
- In 2004, photographer Elena Filatova published a photo-essay on her website of an aleged solo motorcycle rides through Pripyat and the Chernobyl Exclusion Zone. The solo motorcycle ride story was later revealed to be a hoax; most of the photos had been taken during a guided tour, and some were not taken by her at all but found on the internet.
- Heavy Water: a poem for Chernobyl (Enitharmon Press, 2004) ISBN 1-900564-34-3 and Half Life (Poems for Chernobyl) (Heaventree Press, 2004) ISBN 0-9545317-3-6 were based on first-hand accounts of the disaster, winning the Arvon prize and providing the source material for the award-winning art film, Heavy Water: a Film for Chernobyl (Seventh Art Productions, 2006).
- Martin Cruz Smith's novel, Wolves Eat Dogs (2005), is set mostly in Chernobyl, when the Moscow detective Arkady Renko investigates the murder of a powerful businessman in that area, after the businessman's partner has died in Moscow of radiation poisoning. Both victims are found to have had some involvement with the accident, 20 years earlier.
- Jim Shepard's "The Zero Meter Diving Team" (2007) is a short story about the disaster, narrated in the first person by Boris Yakovlevich Prushinsky, chief engineer of the Soviet Department of Nuclear Energy. The story first appeared in Bomb magazine and later appeared in Shepard's short story collection, Like You'd Understand, Anyway (2007), Vintage Books.
- Darragh McKeon's novel All That is Solid Melts into Air (2014) uses the disaster as the backdrop for chronicling the end of the Soviet Union.
- In the Mort and Phil comics album Chernobil... ¡Qué cuchitril!, the titular characters have to investigate mysterious things happening in Chernobyl 25 years after the disaster.
- In volume 1 of Guillermo del Toro and Chuck Hogan's The Strain trilogy, Professor Abraham Setrakian explains that the Master is naturally drawn to the sites of humanity's greatest disasters and atrocities. In volume 2, The Fall, corrupt businessman Eldritch Palmer meets with "The Master", the leader of the rogue vampires, in Pripyat, to plan the vampires' takeover of the world.
- Markiyan Kamysh's novel Stalking the Atomic City: Life Among the Decadent and the Depraved of Chornobyl(2022).

== Music ==
- Polish singer Jacek Kaczmarski wrote a song titled "Dzień Gniewu II (Czarnobyl)" (Day of Wrath II (Chernobyl), written in May 1986 and released a year later), about the day of the disaster in Pripyat, its citizens unaware of the unfolding tragedy. The song juxtaposes calm, ballada-like music with the perspective of imminent death (such as "Around the well in the backyard / wet, smiley faces / a child chases wheel / it is being killed as well"), serving as a protest song against the Soviet handling of the disaster and the secrecy that surrounded it.
- The 1986 song "Jijiji" by Argentinian rock band Patricio Rey y sus Redonditos de Ricota was inspired by this incident
- David Bowie's 1987 song "Time Will Crawl" was inspired by the disaster.
- The incident also inspired the song "Burli" from the 1987 album Liebe, Tod & Teufel by Austrian pop group Erste Allgemeine Verunsicherung. It tells the story of a "Burli" (Austrian German for "boy") born with multiple physical deformities following a nuclear accident, concluding with his marriage to a girl with similar deformities as a result of the Chernobyl disaster. ("Auch sie hat einiges zuviel / als Andenken an Tschernobyl" "She also has a bit too much / As a souvenir of Chernobyl".) The single was denied airplay on West German radio due to being considered insensitive to victims of the disaster and people with disabilities generally.
- New Zealand musician Shona Laing's song "Soviet Snow", released in 1987, was inspired by the Chernobyl disaster.
- English heavy metal band Saxon describe their personal experiences of the disaster in the track "Red Alert" on their 1988 album, Destiny.
- The Japanese punk band The Blue Hearts' song "Chernobyl", on their 1988 single "Blue Hearts Theme", was written in protest of nuclear power. The band's record label at the time had ties to the nuclear industry, thus the group left the label to release the song.
- "Mayday in Kiev", a song by Watchtower on their 1989 album Control and Resistance. The song title is a pun on the May Day celebrations, which were held in the Ukrainian capital Kyiv only days after the explosion as if nothing had happened, and the emergency signal mayday.
- Paul Simon's 1990 song "Can't Run But", found on The Rhythm of the Saints contains references to the disaster.
- French Canadian punk rock band Banlieue Rouge's 1990 debut album "En attendant demain..." features a song entitled "Tchernobyl", deploring the deadly consequences suffered by so many owing to the misjudgment of so few.
- The German electronic band Kraftwerk mentions Chernobyl at the beginning of their 1991 remix of their song "Radioactivity", released on the album The Mix. Chernobyl is mentioned along with other places of nuclear incidents and accidents, such as Harrisburg, Sellafield and Hiroshima. The names were included in the remix of the song because some critics had found the original version of the song to be too optimistic towards nuclear energy.
- American rap group Outkast makes a reference to the disaster in the song "Millenium" on their second album ATLiens released in 1996. André 3000s lyrics start the song off with the line "Me and everything around me, is unstable like Chernobyl".
- The 1997 song "Spam" by the band Save Ferris claims that the product is made in Chernobyl, to rhyme with the line, "It's pink and it's oval."
- Swedish black metal band Craft has a song referring to the disaster called "Reaktor 4" on their second album, Terror Propaganda, released in 2002.
- The music video for the 2007 song "What We Made" by British rapper Example is shot on location at Pripyat, focusing on some parts of the city that has been greatly affected by the disaster.
- Crossover thrash band Municipal Waste wrote a song entitled "Wolves of Chernobyl", which was about the effects of the fallout, on their 2009 album Massive Aggressive.
- The music video for "Sweet People", performed by Ukraine's Eurovision Song Contest 2010 entry Alyosha, was filmed in Pripyat.
- "Colony Collapse" from the 2014 album Lost Forever // Lost Together by British band Architects makes reference to the disaster.
- For the 20th anniversary box set of Pink Floyd's 1994 album, The Division Bell a new video was recorded at Pripyat for the instrumental "Marooned" which also served as the box set's lead single.
- Brazilian musician Fredi Endres (of the band Comunidade Nin-Jitsu) calls himself "DJ Chernobyl" in a solo project. The nickname comes from the MTV Brasil Rockgol football championship, where the comedian hosts likened his haircut to the nuclear accident.
- Russian band Amatory dedicated a song titled "Cherno" (Russian: "Черно)" from the album DOOM (2019) to the Chernobyl disaster.
- Ukrainian band Go A used an aerial shot of the Chernobyl power plant for their music video for the piece "Shum" for the Eurovision Song Contest 2021.
- South African band Kalahari Surfers released a mini-album in 2019 titled Chernobyl which contains the song "Human Wrongs- Chernobyl 25th Anniversary" written by W.Sony'.
- Thrash metal band Megadeth wrote a song entitled "Dogs of Chernobyl" from their 2022 album, The Sick, the Dying... and the Dead!.
- The Scary Jokes' 2023 album Retinal Bloom featured the song "Elephant Foot" as a single.
- German technical death metal band Cytotoxin, which describes its style as “Chernobyl Death Metal,” has based recurring lyrical and conceptual themes on the Chernobyl disaster and its consequences.

== Television ==
- Nova television series season 16 episode 4 "Back To Chernobyl" (1989) was filmed on-location three years after the disaster.
- In The Simpsons season 5 episode 9 "The Last Temptation of Homer" (originally aired on December 9, 1993), Homer Simpson and his new colleague Mindy Simmons represent the Nuclear Power Plant at The National Energy convention in Capital City. Many passers-by are shouting at the nuclear power stand, culminating in one shouting, "No more Chernobyls!", prompting Homer to throw a brick at him.
- In The X-Files season 2 episode "The Host" (originally aired on september 23, 1994), the main antagonist, a mutant creature dubbed "Fluke-Man", is traced to a Russian freighter that was carrying radioactive sewage away from Chernobyl.
- In The Simpsons season 7 episode 7 "King-Size Homer" (originally aired on november 5, 1995), Homer receives a medal and the promise to be thinner again from his boss Mr. Burns, when Homer saves the town by "turning a potential Chernobyl into a mere Three Mile Island."
- In the Millennium season 1 episode 21 "Maranatha" (originally aired on may 9, 1997), the hero, Frank Black, tracks a Russian antichrist figure who caused the Chernobyl disaster.
- The September 30, 2009, episode of Destination Truth, a reality television series on Syfy, features a paranormal investigation located at the site.
- In the 2010-2011 television series The Event, the character Thomas is said to have been responsible for the disaster at Chernobyl after attempting to transport the fuel rods from the site using alien technology.
- Motylki, Ukrainian miniseries, aired on April 27, 2013.
- In the British TV series Top Gear, season 21 episode 3 (originally aired on February 16, 2014), presenters Jeremy Clarkson and James May had to drive past the reactor as a part of a challenge. Clarkson ran out of fuel and was made to stop not far from the reactor.
- In Scorpion season 2 episode 23 ("Chernobyl Intentions", airdate April 18, 2016), the team works on an issue with the Chernobyl sarcophagus.
- Chernobyl miniseries, produced by HBO and Sky Atlantic, aired on May 6, 2019.
- In American Dad! season 15 episode 18, "The Chilly Thrillies" (originally aired on August 24, 2020), a hurt and betrayed Roger flees to Chernobyl in an attempt to prevent Francine from recording his whispered chatter for her to use as relaxing ASMR material.

== Video games ==
- In the home computer game Maniac Mansion (1987), the player can find a hidden nuclear reactor described as "made in Chernobyl".
- A hidden codec conversation in the video game Metal Gear Solid (1998) reveals that the supporting character Nastasha Romanenko was born in Pripyat and lived three kilometers north of there. The disaster occurred when she was 10 years old and lead to her parents' deaths from radiation sickness some years later, as well as her stance against nuclear weapons.
- The video game Snatcher (1988) features in its backstory a horrific disaster known as "The Catastrophe", involving an explosion at a nuclear facility in Chernoton, Russia that released into the atmosphere a biotoxin called Lucifer-Alpha which kills a large percent of the world's populace. Said catastrophe bears similarities to the Chernobyl disaster.
- The arcade game Chelnov (1988) was believed to be named after the events at Chernobyl, despite some developers stating it was independent of the Chernobyl disaster, other developers stated it originally had an alternative name but was changed to Chelnov due to the recent Chernobyl events.
- The computer game S.T.A.L.K.E.R.: Shadow of Chernobyl (2007), its prequel S.T.A.L.K.E.R.: Clear Sky, and its sequel S.T.A.L.K.E.R.: Call of Pripyat are based on the Chernobyl plant, disaster, and the surrounding areas. In the first two games, the power plant is the setting of the final stages. The games are also substantially influenced by the novel Roadside Picnic and Tarkovsky's film Stalker. The games are set in the Chernobyl Exclusion Zone; although the Zone is not replicated exactly, various landmarks, geographic features, and overall geography resemble and are based upon field trips to the Zone. The power plant is seemingly guarded by a fanatical cult called the "Monolith", which worships a mysterious crystal that resides in Reactor No. 4.
  - The sequel S.T.A.L.K.E.R. 2: Heart of Chornobyl is canonically set 9 years after S.T.A.L.K.E.R.: Call of Pripyat. It features both new and familiar areas from the original trilogy, all combined into one seemingly open world with the overall layout closer to the actual Chornobyl, but still heavily fictionalized. Originally set to release earlier in 2022, it was delayed due to the ongoing invasion of Russia but eventually released in late 2024.
- The video game Call of Duty 4: Modern Warfare (2007) features mission 11, "All Ghillied Up", and mission 12, "One Shot One Kill", and a multiplayer map, "Bloc", set in buildings and streets in and around abandoned Pripyat. The dangers of radiation and feral dogs are elements of the gameplay.
- Call of Duty: Modern Warfare 2 (2009) features the Spec Ops map "Hidden" and areas previously featured in "All Ghillied Up". There is also a multiplayer map "Wasteland" that is set in the outskirts of Pripyat. Reactor 4 can be seen in the distance in one area of the map. In the event that someone detonates a tactical nuke, the blast can be seen coming from the reactor.
- Call of Duty: Modern Warfare 3 (2011) includes a flashback cutscene of the mission "One Shot One Kill", from the point of view of the playable character Yuri and the series antagonist Vladimir Makarov, witnessing the attempted assassination of Imran Zakhaev.
- Counter-Strike: Global Offensive features a map based on Chernobyl called "de_cache". In April 2026, the map was re-added to Counter-Strike 2 with a visual overhaul.
- The science fiction horror video game Chernobylite is based in the exclusion zone of the aftermath of the Chernobyl Disaster.
- Reiuji Utsuho from Subterranean Animism (2008) of the Touhou Project franchise has her right leg encased in concrete similarly to the Elephant's Foot. Her design might also be inspired by the alleged 'Blackbird of Chernobyl'
- The video game Chornobyl Liquidators, released in 2024, puts players in the role of a liquidator immediately following the incident. Players are tasked with cleaning up the surrounding area.

== See also ==
- Disaster tourism
