= Christo, Castro and Free Love =

Novel by Georgi Tenev

Christo, Castro and Free Love is a novel by the Bulgarian writer Georgi Tenev.

The author tries to dramatize the relation between the life of a journalist intellectual and the world of the big figures in art and politics. On the one side stands the main character. On the other side are Christo Javacheff and Fidel Castro. In the novel Christo is going to "wrap" the rebuilt World Trade Center Twin Towers at New York. Purely fictional and oneiric experiences are inseparably interwoven with large sections of real personages or of slightly modified personages and events. For example, Christo bears his real name while his wife Jeanne-Claude is hereby renamed to become Pilar-Annuncion.

In 2008 Christo, Castro and Free Love was the first fiction publication in Vagabond, Bulgaria's English Monthly, cooperation between the magazine and The Elizabeth Kostova Foundation (EKF), giving the chance to read in English the work of Bulgarian writers "that the EKF considers original, refreshing and valuable".

== Editions ==
First published in 2005 by T.A.G., ISBN 9549475018, ISBN 978-954-9475-01-2
Second edition - 2008, Altera, ISBN 978-954-9757-17-0
