= The Bell of Chernobyl =

1987 documentary film by Rollan Serhienko

The Bell of Chernobyl is a 1987 documentary film directed by Ukrainian filmmaker, Rollan Serhienko. The film was made following the Chernobyl nuclear disaster and includes a variety of accounts of the incident and its implications for nearby communities. The film's synopsis describes it as presenting "an indictment against the irresponsible application of nuclear technology, armament and the Cold War". The film is presented in Russian language with English subtitles and is 89 minutes long. It was screened at IDFA in the Netherlands in 1988. The New York Times indicates that an 84-minute version of the film exists. The film is also known by the alternative titles The Poison of Chernobyl and Le Tocsin de Tchernobyl.
