= Roman Shumunov =

Israeli film director and screenwriter

Roman Shumunov (Hebrew: רומן שומונוב; born 1984) is an Israeli film director and screenwriter.

== Biography ==
Roman Shumunov (born 1984 in Tbilisi, Georgia) is an Israeli film and television director and screenwriter, best known for his emotionally powerful and socially engaged works that explore themes of immigration, identity, and memory. His films have been screened internationally and have received multiple awards, including recognition from the Ophir Awards, the Banff World Media Festival and nominations for the International Emmy Awards.

== Filmography ==
- 2011: No One But Us, short, 35 min, diploma work.
- 2012: Eyes, short
- 2015: Red Echoes of War
- 2016: Babylon Dreamers, documentary, 90 min.
  - Summary: A breakdancing team formed by immigrants from the former Soviet Union in a poor neighborhood in Israel plan competing in the International Breakdancing Competition in Germany.
- 2018: Here and Now (Hebrew: כאן ועכשיו), full feature film debut
  - Summary: A social drama evolving around a rap band of young immigrants from the former Soviet Union who live in the poor neighborhood of Ashdod and are rehearsing for auditions for an international music festival.
- 2020: Back to Chernobyl, documentary
- 2021: Berenshtein - The last Partisan (Hebrew: ברנשטיין — הפרטיזן האחרו), drama film
  - Based on a real story of Leonid Berenstein (1921–2019), commander of a partisan battalion, who discovered the secret test site of the Nazi "doomsday weapon", V2-rocket
- 2022 As Long as in the Heart,; English-language version: Memory Forest, a TV series in four 34 minute parts aired by Kan Educational about a group of Israeli teenagers on an educational trip to Poland to gain an experience about the Holocaust.
- 2022: One and a Half Generation, TV mini series produced by Kan 11.
- 2022 Munich 72 – A three-part docudrama recreating the 1972 Munich Olympic tragedy, produced with Global Screen and Channel 8 Israel.
- Memory Forest (2022) – A four-part youth drama for Kan Educational, following Israeli students on a journey to Poland to explore the Holocaust’s legacy. Winner – Banff World Media Festival 2023; Nominee – International Emmy Awards 2023.
- The Things That Were Lost (2024) – A three-part drama miniseries for Kan 11 about Rona, a teenage girl coping with the loss of her sister after the October 7th massacre. Winner – Banff World Media Festival 2025. Best Film Chelsea Film Festival 2025.

== Awards ==
- No one but us
  - 2012: Best Short Film, at the Mexico International Film Festival.
  - 2012: Best Actor Award and Honorable Mention Prize: Haifa International Film Festival.
  - 2011: Best Original Music, Cinema South Film Festival, Israel.
- Babylon Dreamers
  - 2016: Best debut film, at the DocAviv, Tel-Aviv International Documentary Film Festival
    - Jury Rationale: "The best debut prize is given to Roman Shumunov, a young filmmaker who brings his great rebel spirit to his film Babylon Dreamers. His fresh approach in portraying a group of tough and sensitive breakdancers opens up a window of hope and new possibilities for underground culture."
  - 2017: Best Documentary Film Award: KIFF Kiev International Film Festival, Ukraine
  - 2017: Best First Film Award at Israeli Documentary Film Awards
  - 2017: Audience Award for Best Film at the Moscow International Documentary Film Festival
  - 2018: Winner in section "We are changing" "(Mi változunk)" at the Budapest International Documentary Festival
- Here and Now
  - 2015, At the project stage, under the tentative title No Future, the film won the Jerusalem Film Festival Pitch Point’s Van Leer Foundation Award. Jury's opinion: "The film has the potential to be a unique, sensitive and authentic voice of an important ethnic group in Israel"
  - 2018, Best Music Award and the Ophir Awards
  - 2019, Best Screenplay Award Zabaikalsky International Film Festival.
- Berenshtein - The Last Partisan
  - 2022, Best Feature Film Award at Montreal Israeli Film Festival.
  - 2022, Best Director Award at Montreal Israeli Film Festival.
  - 2022 Best Feature Film – Stony Brook Film Festival, USA
  - 2023 Audience Award – Philadelphia Jewish Film Festival, USA
  - 2023 Best Feature Film – Philadelphia Jewish Film Festival, USA
- Memory Forest
- Winner – Banff World Media Festival 2023
- Nominee – International Emmy Awards 2023
- Remnants
- 2025 Winner – Banff World Media Festival
- 2025 Winner - Chelsea Film Festival, USA
