= Dogs in the Chernobyl exclusion zone =

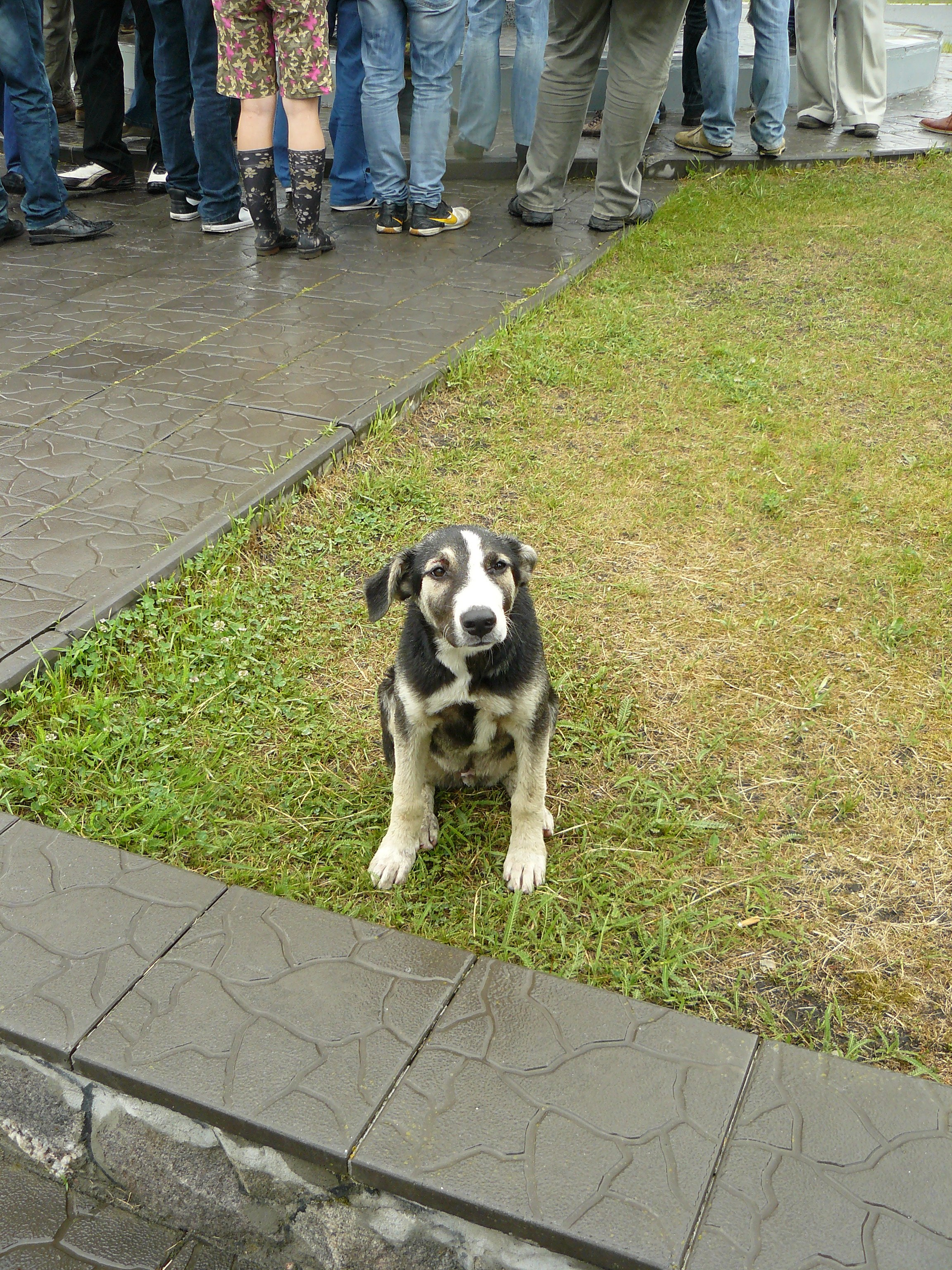
A dog in the Chernobyl exclusion zone, 2013

On April 25, 1986, a safety test was conducted on Chernobyl's Unit 4 reactor during a planned maintenance shutdown. Operators attempted to determine whether slowing the turbine could provide enough power to cool the reactor in the event of an outage. Miscommunication between the test engineers and plant safety staff led to the reactor operating under unstable conditions. The resulting power surge caused fuel damage, steam buildup, and two explosions early on April 26—one from steam pressure and another likely from the buildup of hydrogen. The blasts ignited fires and released radioactive material into the atmosphere, prompting the evacuation of nearby residents within a 30-kilometer zone that later became known as the Chernobyl Exclusion Zone.

After the 1986 nuclear disaster in Chernobyl, the regional domestic dog population suffered from environmental pollution originating from the radiation. This disaster made the environment highly mutagenic, leading to various evolutionary processes including, but not limited to, bottlenecks, directional selection, and higher rates of mutation resulting in evolutionary trajectories that differ from unexposed animals.

== History ==
=== Origin of populations ===
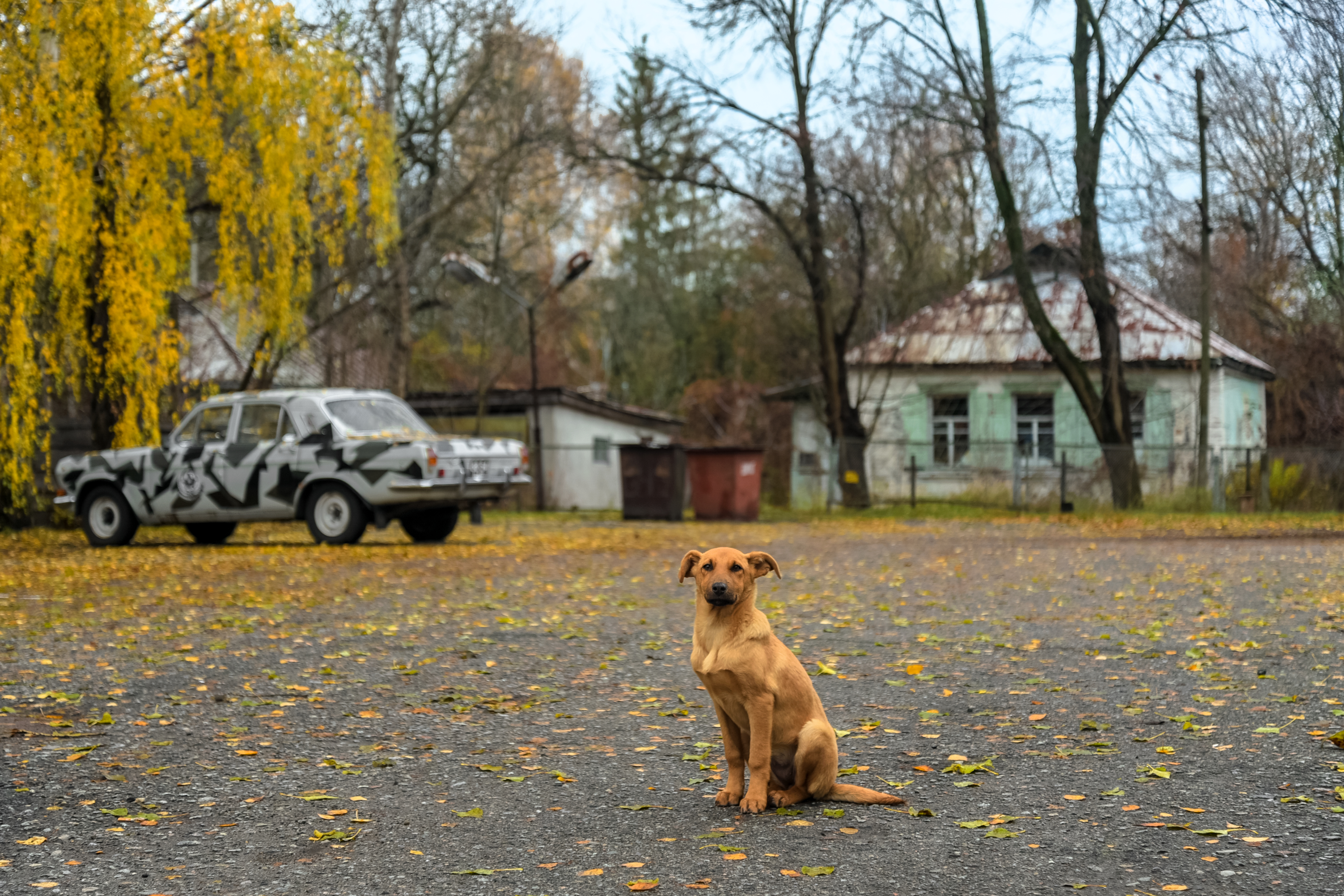
A dog in the Chernobyl exclusion zone, 2017

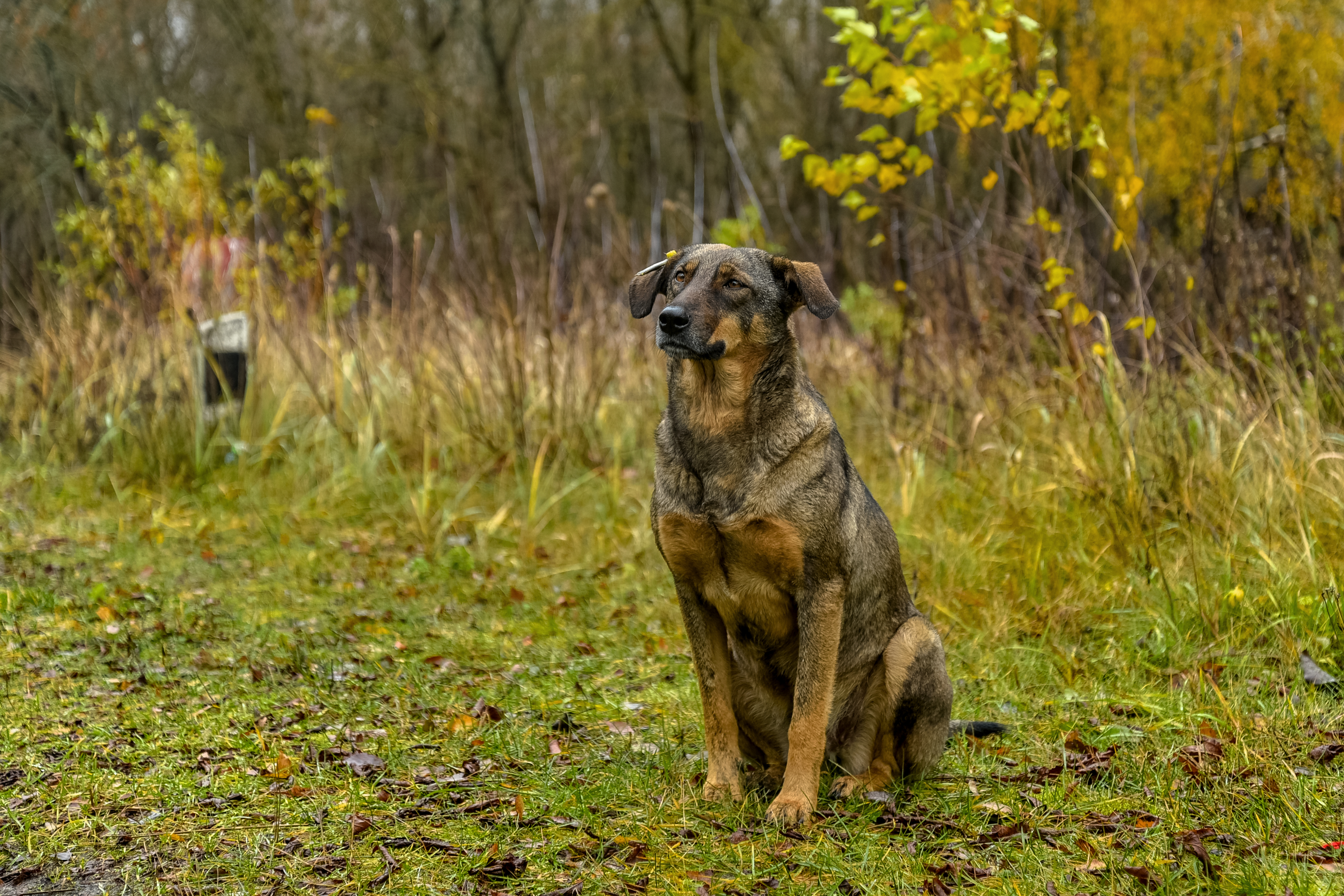
A dog in the Chernobyl exclusion zone, 2017

The exact origin of the populations of dogs living in the Chernobyl Nuclear Power Plant (CNPP) and the surrounding areas of the Chernobyl exclusion zone is unknown. However, it is hypothesized that these animals are the descendants of pets left behind during the original evacuation of Pripyat. Following the 1986 Chernobyl disaster, residents were ordered to evacuate with less than an hour's notice, leaving most of their animals behind. While many of these original pets population were killed by the Ukrainian Ministry of Internal Affairs to prevent the further spread of radiation, some dogs are believed to have survived by avoiding culling efforts and were soon after cared for by cleanup workers in the Exclusion Zone. Those that survived reproduced. There are currently two geographically and genetically distinct populations of dogs in the area, one in the CNPP and one in Chernobyl City. Scientists discovered this by implementing tracking and survey programs and conducting genetic analyses of the two dog populations. These studies showed limited gene flow and strong genetic differentiation despite the groups being only about 16 kilometers apart.

=== Population and Genomic characteristics ===
In 2017, researchers launched the Chernobyl Dog Research Initiative after noticing that the number of stray dogs in the exclusion zone had grown dramatically, with estimates suggesting a population of more than 800 animals. In response, three temporary veterinary centers were tasked with examining and testing geographic diversity within the populations living within and outside of the CNPP. In total, blood was drawn from 302 dogs, 132 living inside of the CNPP which included the nuclear power plant (NPP) itself (81 dogs), Pripyat 3km from the CNPP (9 dogs), Semikhody train station (14 dogs) and the interim used fuel storage facilities (ISF2) (28 dogs); 154 dogs in Chernobyl City 15km away from the CNPP, and 16 dogs in Slavutych, 30km away from the CNPP. 129,497 single-nucleotide polymorphisms (SNPs) were tested and used to create a choropleth map to measure the genetic similarities between these populations. The study found three genetically distinct populations that tend to gather in the choropleth map based on location. These clusters showed that dogs from the same region were most closely related to each other. However, there was overlap with a small portion of the population from Chernobyl City clustering with each region. When dogs within the CNPP were analyzed against each other, Semikhody did not cluster, showing free-roaming tendencies and interactions with all regions; while ISF2 clustered with their own and NPP and Pripyat clustered with each other. This data suggests gene flow is restricted between groups in the CNPP and those outside of it.

Using the same data collection, researchers measured individual dogs genomic heterozygosity within populations and discovered heterozygosity was highest in populations in Chernobyl City with average levels in Slavutych populations. This suggests that individuals in these populations have outbred while those within the CNPP have not. The low levels in CNPP populations suggest inbreeding.

Next, researchers measured kinship to purebred and free-breeding dogs in Europe, Asia, the Middle-East, neighboring countries and other Ukrainian cities by running principal components analysis (PCA)—split into PC1 (measuring variation within all dogs sampled) and PC2 (measuring variation within Chernobyl). The analysis of PC1 showed that dogs from Chernobyl were genetically different from dogs in Asia, the Middle-East and most purebred dogs but overlapped genetically with Shepherd breeds and free-roaming dogs and some eastern European populations. PC2 showed that dogs sampled within the NPP were genetically distinct from the dogs in Chernobyl City and beyond. Dogs from Slavutych did not form clusters, showing genetic links to purebred dogs, suggesting foreign ancestry. When researchers took a closer look they discovered that the dogs in the NPP specifically, were most closely related to Shepherd and eastern European breeds while dogs in Chernobyl City were most closely related to Roman-Mastiff breeds.

The data was later used to determine familial relationships within clustered populations. It was easy for the researchers to differentiate between ancestor and progeny but difficult to differentiate whether siblings were full-blood or half. Due to this, the researchers prioritized the former, discovering the presence of 15 distinct families. The first family consisted of 162 individuals from various regions within Chernobyl, suggesting the presence of gene flow amongst existing populations. 7 of the 15 families consisted only of one parent and one child while another family was related by a single individual from Pripyat, composed of 10 to 14 individuals from the Semikhody train station. It was observed that males are habitual maters while females only mate when in heat. These results suggest there is a complex social structure of mating and that it happens across regions in Chernobyl.

Lastly, when researchers compared DNA from their data set to purebreds they discovered that dogs in the NPP had a higher frequency of similar alleles to their purebred counterpart than those outside of this zone. Due to these free-roaming dogs being isolated to a highly radioactive area, they partake in increased levels of inbreeding. Their related ancestry is displayed in the similarity to their ancestors while dog populations in Chernobyl City, where humans have returned, are outbreeding with other dog populations.

=== Life in the Exclusion Zone ===
At present there is estimated to be over 700 dogs living in the Exclusion Zone with little growth in the population's numbers. While litters are born each year, the dogs are at risk of facing aggression from local wildlife, namely packs of wolves. This drives them out of the surrounding forests, bringing them closer to power plants and human activity. These aggressive interactions with wild animals are the main source of rabies in the population. Their lack of innate survival skills makes them reliant on humans and unable to live independently. In addition to rabies, the dogs face harsh environmental conditions and may die due to hypothermia, radiation exposure, malnutrition or car collisions, all contributing to an average lifespan of just 3-6 years old.

The dogs are not fully isolated from humanity, as there are 3,500 people each day who work in close proximity, providing care where they can. This has become increasingly difficult due to worries of rabies infection alongside the COVID epidemic. Despite this, in 2017, the Clean Futures Fund (CFF) created a program 'Dogs of Chernobyl' where three veterinary clinics opened to provide treatment for dogs with parvovirus, rabies, hepatitis and distemper. The non-profit is also in charge of neutering the strays in an effort to control the population and provide them with sustainable care, resulting in reduced birth rates and healthier individuals.

Researcher Jonathan Turnbull, cultural and environmental geographer of Cambridge University's geography department, documented how guards and workers within the exclusion zone frequently developed relationships with these dogs. Guards stationed at checkpoints may build them shelters, provide them with scraps and other leftovers as well as administering basic care like tick removal. In return for the guards' care, the dogs ward off encroaching wolves and provide entertainment along with needed companionship. In 2016, an initiative called the New Safe Confinement began, which would place a structure over the destroyed Reactor 4. However, when it was completed in 2019, most of the guards and employees had no plans to return to the CEZ depleting the dogs food supply. The CFF stepped in shortly after, setting up food and water stations to ensure the populations could sustain themselves. After the Russian invasion of Ukraine in 2022, which led to the Capture of Chernobyl resulted in over 300 staff on duty at the time being held hostage and the dogs being briefly left without supervision and care.

The 2019 documentary film "Fallout Dogs" directed by Julia Oldham follows the activities of stray dogs around the Chernobyl Exclusion Zone. Oldham, a multimedia artist known for exploring relationship between nature and technology, features a local translator and tour guide of the Exclusion Zone in said film and highlighted the local's personal efforts to care for the dogs by way of feeding and interacting with them frequently.

== Evolutionary processes ==
=== Rapid evolution ===
The dogs suffer from radiation that may differentiate them genetically from the population of CEZ with their surroundings. Nevertheless, processes such as the high likelihood of inbreeding can lead to difficulties at the moment of analyzing their genome. In addition, the conditions of their habitat, human control in the access to the CEZ, may simulate an island habitat in terms of evolutionary processes such as isolation.

=== Mutations ===
Despite the evidence of genetic differentiation mainly due to the radioactive environment, there is no support for pinpoint radiation as the primary driver of genetic differentiation; the evidence serves as insight for further research in these populations. Some regions of the genome indicate that they can be driven by directional selection. 391 outlier loci are influenced by directional selection, with at least 52 candidate genes. Some of the outlier loci are associated with DNA repair.

=== Comparisons with unexposed populations ===
Genetic signatures of the Chernobyl dog populations have been compared to both pure-bred and free-breeding dog population genetic structures. The Chernobyl populations did not share increased similarity to pure-bred dogs, indicating that the populations of dogs of Chernobyl have not been inundated with individuals that are modern pets. Instead, this population is similar to free-breeding populations, indicating that the population has been established at least since the disaster in 1986. However, the Chernobyl dogs show enough differentiation from these populations that they can be used as a unique entity for further genomic study.

=== Comparisons between the two exposed populations ===
Megan Dillon has done substantial research in determining genetic differences between the two populations of Chernobyl dogs, classifying them as Chernobyl City (CC) and Nuclear Power Plant (NPP) through factors such as pathogenic prevalence in ticks and genetic diversity on the chromosomal level.

Dillon's work with pathogenic prevalence in ticks showed a significant difference in exposures in these two locations. The results showed that most ticks in the CEZ are Castor bean tick (Ixodus ricinus) with a very small population of Ornate cow tick (Dermator reticulatus). 56.9% of I. ricinus were contaminated with 1+ pathogens, and with this knowledge, there was a substantially higher amount of bacteria contained in the ticks in the NPP (44% A. phagocytophilum and 42% B. burgdorferi) than CC (23.1% A. phagocytophilum and 19% B. burgdorferi). Despite this, there was a much lower level of A. phagocytophilum in the NPP dogs than in the CC dogs (1.8% and 11.7%). Despite all of this information, tick-borne parasites were equal for both populations.

Dillon's focus on the genetic diversity between the populations used karyotypic architecture, quantification of genetic differentiation, short tandem repeat (STR) analysis, and count of derived alleles from outgroup ancestors.

With these methods at the disposal of researchers, the karyotypic architecture collected eight samples, four from each of the two populations of dogs; however, only seven (three CC, four NPP) of these samples managed to produce sufficient quality of metaphase spreads for analysis. From these samples, 76 autosomes and two sex chromosomes were collected from each dog. Through this analysis, there were no abnormalities found in these populations.

For quantifying genetic differentiation between the two populations in the CEZ and unaffected dogs in Eastern Europe, the fixation index was significantly different for all values. The CC dogs were less significantly different from Eastern European populations (0.0178-0.0503) compared to NPP dogs in relation to Eastern European populations (0.503-0.0654), which supports the discriminant analysis of principal components (DAPC) with two distinct clusters of CC and NPP dogs.

For short tandem repeat (STR) analysis, the goal was to determine if the genetic difference in these two populations was due to mutation. With this in mind, fifty-four autosomal loci were selected for testing, 19 from unstable canine cancer, 20 from the International Society for Animal Genetics Parentage panel, and 15 from DogFiler (a specific DNA profiling panel for scientific and forensic use). These loci were extracted from STR genotypes from 106 samples between the two populations, with GangSTR finding that only 94 samples contained the sample location and length for the chromosome. A further 10 locus samples were removed for over half of the individuals due to inadequate quality. The remaining genotypes of 44 locus samples from the 94 individuals were then placed into Genetic Analysis in Excel (GenAlEx) for each locus of each sample to be analyzed based on the number of alleles, the number of effective alleles, and the number of private alleles. With these numbers, the Shannon index was calculated alongside the expected and observed heterozygosity and the fixation number. With this data collected there were significant differences between CC and NPP populations in the number of alleles (7.356 and 6.133), effective number of alleles (4.284 and 3.33), number of private alleles (1.733 and 0.511), Shannon index (1.561 and 1.339), expected heterozygosity (0.621 observed 0.718 expected for CNN, 0.583 observed 0.660 expected), and Polymorphic Information content (PIC)(genetic marker for variation within a population) (0.685 and 0.618).

The final experiment Dillon performed to determine the difference between these two populations was based on the populations' ancestors, as radiation leads to an increase in germ-line mutation rates, so the population with a higher expected number of derived alleles will have an increased mutation rate. Using whole-genome sequencing analysis (WGS), two outgroups were compared to the CC and NPP populations: the Basenji is an ancient dog breed that isn't common between the CEZ populations, and gray wolves (Canis lupus). Five dogs were randomly selected from each CC and NPP populations and were compared to a merged genotype of three Basenji dogs. To decrease genetic diversity between the Basenji dogs, the only loci that were compared to the CEZ dogs were which the alleles in the Basenji dogs were homozygous in all three samples. The comparison between the CEZ dog populations and the Basenji merged genotype was performed twice; however, the results agreed that the CC population had a higher amount of derived alleles (CC:0.503 NPP: 0.497/CC: 0.504, NPP: 0.496). When the comparison was done with a sample of five gray wolves, there was no difference between the two populations (CC: 0.500 NPP:0.500). When the fixation index was calculated, it drew the same conclusions: that the CC dogs were more similar to the Basenji dogs than the NPP population, and the CC and NPP populations derived the same amount from Gray wolves.

The conclusion was apparent, showing that there was no evidence of radiation-induced characteristics, as there wasn't a higher level of mutation with the NPP population, but there was evidence that directional selection took place with the NPP and CC populations, as they regulate the cell cycle and their response to DNA damage. Despite these accomplishments, these experiments didn't find the cause of differentiation between these populations, and further research needs to be done to see if the differences are due to environmental exposures.

=== Blue dog mystery ===
As of 13 October 2025, Clean Futures Fund (CFF) employees noticed a change in fur color, with some of the dogs having a blue-tint to their fur; three have been observed thus far. The spokesperson for the CFF stated that they believe that the dogs may have gotten into a chemical, but due to these dogs being able to recognize CFF workers by their uniform, they have evaded capture. Dr. Jennifer Betz, the Veterinary Medical Director for the Dogs of Chernobyl program with the Clean Futures Fund, announced a theory on 31st October 2025, that these "blue dogs of Chernobyl" have been rolling in a blue chemical from a nearby porta-potty, which resulted in the blue coloration, clarifying that this coloration has no relation to genetic mutation.

== Relief efforts ==
Since 2017, the Clean Futures Fund has implemented annual clinics in the Chernobyl Exclusion Zone to vaccinate, spay, and neuter the dogs of Chernobyl. This effort is made to reduce the risk of rabies passing to workers and tourists, to decrease the population size of the dogs, and to minimize the suffering that the dogs experience. The dogs in the zone are able to recognize the uniforms of CFF personnel and often avoid capture. For this reason, the CFF changes the color of their uniforms every year in order to vaccinate, spay, and neuter the dogs.

In 2018, the CFF facilitated 34 adoptions of dogs from the CEZ to Canada and the USA but have since paused these efforts due to concerns of spreading radiation. It is unknown if or when adoptions will resume.

In October 2022, Clean Futures Fund visited and sterilized 130 of the newly estimated 700 dogs. During a return visit in June, it was discovered that no puppies had been produced in the several months since the visit in October.
