= The Scary Jokes =

Musical project created by Liz Lehman

- Genres: Bedroom pop; synthpop; indie pop
- Years active: 2014–present
- Label: Needlejuice
- Members: Liz Lehman; (see members)
- Website: thescaryjokes.com

The Scary Jokes is the musical project of American singer-songwriter Liz Lehman, conceived by Lehman in 2014 in New Jersey. Their (Note: Lehman is non-binary and uses they/them pronouns.) music has been characterized as bedroom pop and synthpop. Their albums include April Fools (2016), Burn Pygmalion!!! A Better Guide to Romance (2019), and Retinal Bloom (2023).

== Career ==
Liz Lehman created the Scary Jokes from their bedroom in New Jersey in 2014. Following several early demo releases, the Scary Jokes released their debut album, bad at math, that same year. It was followed by April Fools (2016) and Burn Pygmalion!!! A Better Guide to Romance (2019), the latter being a concept album about a journalist contemplating their romantic relationship. Throughout this time, the Scary Jokes amassed an online following, particularly on the website Tumblr.

In 2021, a version of April Fools, remixed and remastered by musician Angel Marcloid, was released on digital platforms, as well as on CD, vinyl, and cassette. Marcloid also co-produced the Scary Jokes' fourth album, Retinal Bloom. Retinal Bloom spawned the single "Our Murderous Descent", a song Lehman was inspired to write after standing near a large waterfall; during the songwriting process, Lehman tied the concept of standing up under the force of a waterfall to members of the LGBTQ community supporting each other in the face of hostility. The album also spawned another single, "Riptide", based on the 2009 film Jennifer's Body and the media's exploitation of the film's lead actress, Megan Fox. Retinal Bloom was released on May 26, 2023. Lehman was also featured on The Fader's 2023 Bandcamp exclusive song compilation FADER & Friends Vol. 1 with their rendition of Tiny Tim's "Livin’ in the Sunlight, Lovin’ in the Moonlight."

== Discography ==
=== EPs ===
- blankets (2014) Tumblr exclusive EP
- car phone (2014)
- Cat City Vol.1 - "White Rabbit" (2025)

=== Albums ===
- bad at math (2014)
- April Fools (2016)
- Burn Pygmalion!!! A Better Guide to Romance (2019)
- Retinal Bloom (2023)

=== Singles ===
- "Livin' in the Sunlight, Lovin' in the Moonlight" (2023) Feature on FADER & Friends Vol. 1

=== Soundtracks ===
- & its beautiful (2021)
- Dream music in "The Meaning of Bunny's Dream" (2025)

== Books ==
- Cat City (2012)

== Members ==
- Liz Lehman – vocals, songwriting, production (2014–present)
- Juniper Abernathy – guitar (2019)
- Ellie Bennett – bass (2019)
