= Party Headquarters =

Novel by Georgi Tenev

Party Headquarters is a Bulgarian novel by Georgi Tenev, awarded with Vick Foundation Award for Novel of the Year (2007). The plot revolves around the changes following the collapse of the Communist Regime in Bulgaria. The novel addresses the emblematic events of the 1980s and the 1990s – the Chernobyl disaster, the anticommunist protests, the arson attack over the Communist Party Headquarters in Sofia. It deals with typologically set associations such as the symbolic use of Georgi Dimitrov's Mausoleum in the plot. To a great extent, this is no historical account but a book about the traumas of totalitarian conscience, about politics interweaving with sexuality.

== Reception ==
“Party Headquarters affected me personally. We still carry within ourselves the attitudes of socialism – subordination and privileges, forcible eroticism, the rule of partocracy. […] Socialism is not over. We live in it even now. […] The book is brilliant, with icy threads running in the ink. […] We fellow writers prefer keeping silence about Chernobyl, the fire in the Party Headquarters, the Pioneer camps; at best we turn our stories into exportable pamphlets. Tenev has managed to break open forbidden locks.” (Marin Bodakov Culture)

“Black irony, the use of lexicon format, the documentary reminders – all this makes Party Headquarters one of the most influential books of the recent times. Reading this novel prevents us from cancelling the memories and from betraying our desire for freedom.” (Amelia Licheva Capital Light)

“Party Headquarters interprets a deeply personal story where the private, the intimate, is publicly exposed. The success of Party Headquarters is most probably due to the peculiar topics and to the clear and easy to apprehend language of the writer.” (Maria Popova Politics)
