= Retinal Bloom =

2023 album by the Scary Jokes

Studio album by the Scary Jokes
- Released: May 26, 2023
- Genres: Psychedelic pop; neo-psychedelia; art pop
- Length: 44:13
- Label: Needlejuice Records
- Producers: The Scary Jokes; Angel Marcloid

The Scary Jokes chronology
BURN PYGMALION!!! A Better Guide to Romance (2019)	Retinal Bloom (2023)

Retinal Bloom is the fourth studio album by the Scary Jokes, the musical project of American singer-songwriter Liz Lehman. The album was released on May 26, 2023, by Needlejuice Records on streaming services, CD, vinyl, and cassette. All songs were written by Lehman and produced by Lehman and Angel Marcloid.

Retinal Bloom has been described as "nightmare pop", with a darker mood and more abstract lyrics compared to their previous album, BURN PYGMALION!!! A Better Guide to Romance.

== Songs ==
Retinal Bloom was supported by the singles "Magic Hat," "Our Murderous Descent," "Uzumaki," "Elephant Foot," and "Riptide". Lehman was inspired to write "Our Murderous Descent" after standing near a large waterfall; during the songwriting process, they (Note: Lehman is non-binary and uses they/them pronouns.) connected the concept of standing up under the force of a waterfall to members of the LGBTQ community supporting each other in the face of hostility. "Riptide" is based on the 2009 horror comedy film Jennifer's Body and the media's exploitation of the film's lead actress, Megan Fox.

The song "Elephant Foot" contains lyrics which pertain to the Elephant's Foot, a mass of radioactive material underneath the Chernobyl Nuclear Power Plant, and to hostility faced by Lehman due to their queer identity and status as an Internet personality.

== Track listing ==
All tracks are written by Liz Lehman.

No.	Title	Length
1.	"Our Murderous Descent"	4:21
2.	"Riptide"	4:09
3.	"Magic Hat"	5:02
4.	"Forever in You"	4:36
5.	"Uzumaki"	4:01
6.	"Elephant Foot"	4:13
7.	"Parthenogenesis"	4:30
8.	"Rage"	4:45
9.	"Demons of Accident"	4:13
10.	"Retreat to Celestial Bodies"	4:23
Total length:		44:13

== Personnel ==
- Liz Lehman – producer, artwork
- Angel Marcloid – producer, mixing, mastering
- Brandon Brown – layout, photography, executive producer
- Jace McLain – executive producer
