= All That Is Solid Melts into Air (novel) =

2014 novel

First edition (publ. Viking Press)

All That is Solid Melts into Air is the debut novel by the Irish writer Darragh McKeon.

Using the Chernobyl disaster as a backdrop, the novel chronicles the collapse and ultimate end of the Soviet Union. McKeon was shortlisted for the Newcomer of the Year award at the 2014 Irish Book Awards.
