= Georgi Tenev =

Bulgarian novelist, short story writer, playwright

- Born: October 9, 1969 (age 56); Sofia, Bulgaria
- Occupations: novelist, short story writer, playwright

Georgi Tenev (born 9 October 1969 in Sofia, Bulgaria) is a Bulgarian novelist, short story writer, playwright and film/TV screenwriter.

Major topics in Tenev's works are the cultural and ideological void in the post-totalitarian societies and the consequent emerging of counter-cultures; the fall of utopias and the social amnesias. Recurring narratives in his novels and plays are also quasi-religion and disbelief, barbarism and revolution, the Holocaust, problem of evil, theodicy. In his recent writings he often addresses environmental issues.

== Biography ==
He is born in 1969 in Sofia. He is the son of Tenyo Tenev and Bozhanka Konstantinova, a descendant of the poet Nikolai Liliev and the literary historian Georgi Konstantinov. In 1988 graduated from the H. Konstantin-Kyril Philosopher High School for Languages and Culture and Philological Studies at Sofia University "St. Kliment Ohridski” (1989–1991). In 1994 he was one of the graduates in the experimental class of Margarita Mladenova and Ivan Dobchev at the National Academy for Theater and Film Arts. He was elected a Herder Fellow by the Bulgarian Herder Award winner Konstantin Iliev and continued his studies at the University of Vienna in 1996/97.

He was a playwright at the Sfumato Theater Workshop (1997–1999) and an assistant at the National Academy of Theater and Film Arts in Sofia (1997–2002).

Since 1994 Georgi Tenev has been a freelance writer, playwright, screenwriter, and publicist. His novels and plays are winners of the most prestigious national awards for prose and drama: VICK Novel of the Year, the Elias Canetti Prize, the Askeer Academy Award.

His novels have been translated into English (Open Letter Books), Spanish (Baile del Sol), and German (eta Verlag, Berlin); the collection of stories was distinguished by the American PEN/Heim Translation Grant; the stories have been published in Bat City Review, Ninth Letter Anthology, Words Without Borders (USA), and Granta (UK). His dramaturgical sequel to Hamlet is noted in The Oxford Companion to Shakespeare.

Writes for the magazines and newspapers Kultura, Edno, Altera, Dnevnik, Literaturen Vestnik, Christianity and Culture (co-founder and editorial board member), Sfumato (co-founder).

Since 2013 he is a curator for projects at the: Sofia City Art Gallery, The Red House, L’Europeo. Tenev was a distinguished Guest Lecturer at the Sozopol Fiction Seminar (2014, 2018). In 2017–2019 led classes in creative writing. He was a program Director for the Practical Dramaturgy Club – New Bulgarian University (2018).

His collection Holy Light (Altera, 2009) is a book of science fiction short stories featuring mainly issues of political correctness/incorrectness and biopolitics treated in a provocative way: racism, ownership over human's reproductive functions, sexual difference, discrimination, violence. Other topics addressed in the story collection are pain and eroticism and different political and cultural values attributed to sexuality. In 2010 translator Angela Rodel was awarded with a PEN Translation Fund Grant to support the translation of the book.

Tenev's novel Party Headquarters (Altera 2007) deals with the social paradoxes of the post-communist Bulgarian society. The key metaphor here is the Chernobyl disaster. It won the Vick Foundation Award for Novel of the Year (2007). "Georgi Tenev examines the most recent past by avoiding taboos and using distinct words – it is a philosophical dealing with memory which uses powerful imagery."

In August 2011 "Returning to the Hague" from the Holy Light collection was published in the online edition of Granta. "On the Beautiful Blue Danube" from the same collection appeared in 2014 Issue of Bat City Review.

Wittenberg Revisited is Georgi Tenev and Ivan Dobchev's "intelligent Stoppardian appropriation of Hamlet" premiered in 2011. The play received the National Literature Prize „Elias Canetti“ 2013. This "local spin-off" by Georgi Tenev and Ivan Dobchev "testify to Shakespeare’s permeation in Bulgarian culture".

Tenev co-wrote the script for Alienation (Otchuzhdenie); the film premiered internationally in the Official Selection of Venice Days ('le Giornate degli Autori') in the frame of the 70th edition of the Venice Film Festival. By the end of the year 2013 Alienation won four international awards.

== Books ==
He is author of books and other publications translated into English, Spanish, German, Polish, French, Russian, Dutch, Lithuanian, and Finnish.

- Georgi Tenev (1999). Epistola. Triumviratus. (Poetry collection)
- Georgi Tenev (2000). The Agent's Fear of Recall. Triumviratus. ISBN 954969514X. (Prose and dramaturgy)
- Georgi Tenev (2002). Цитаделата (The Citadel). Зелена вълна. ISBN 9549109712. (Poem)
- Georgi Tenev (2004). Wunderkind/Karamazov (in Bulgarian). variatations. Triumviratus. ISBN 9549109720. (Novel)
- Georgi Tenev (2005). Кристо и свободната любов (Christo and Free Love). Triumviratus. ISBN 954-9475-01-8. (Novel)
- Georgi Tenev (2006). Партиен дом (Party Headquarters). Делта Ентъртейнмънт (Altera). ISBN 9789549757309. (Novel)
- Georgi Tenev (2008). Christo und die Freie liebe. Делта Ентъртейнмънт (Altera). ISBN 9789549757170. (in German translation)
- Georgi Tenev (2008). Christo, Castro, and Free Love. Делта Ентъртейнмънт (Altera). ISBN 9789549757170. (Trilingual Edition, in Bulgarian and English translation as "Christo and All Those Bad Things," by Angela Rodel)
- Georgi Tenev (2009). Свещена светлина (Holy Light). Делта Ентъртейнмънт (Altera). ISBN 9789549757309. (Stories)
- Georgi Tenev (2010). Mr. M. Делта Ентъртейнмънт (Altera). ISBN 9789549575545. (Novel) (in Bulgarian).
- Georgi Tenev (2010). Casa del Partido. Ediciones Baile del Sol. ISBN 978-8415019268. (in Spanish translation)
- Georgi Tenev (2012). Światło Święte. Scriptum. ISBN 978-83-60163-74-0. (in Polish translation)
- Georgi Tenev (2016). (Партиен дом) Party Headquarters. Open Letter Books, US. ISBN 978-1940953267. (English translation by Angela Rodel)
- Georgi Tenev (2016). Holy Light. Colibri. ISBN 9786191507313. - American PEN/Heim Translation grant (in English translation by Angela Rodel)
- Georgi Tenev (2016). Bulgarian Roses. Colibri. ISBN 978-619-150-899-0. (Novel) (in Bulgarian).
- Georgi Tenev (2017). The Writer's Wife. Colibri. ISBN 978-619-02-0074-1. (Stories)
- Georgi Tenev (2018). Parteipalast (Kakanien Revisited). eta Verlag, Berlin. ISBN 978-3-9819998-1-5. (in German translation)
- Georgi Tenev (2019). Balkan Ritual. Colibri. ISBN 978-619-02-0367-4. (Novel)

=== Other translations and publications ===
- 2011 – Returning to the Hague, Granta (UK), translated by Angela Rodel
- 2011 – Das Tal, heiliges licht, Sprache im technischen Zeitalter (Berlin), translated by Elvira Bormann
- 2014 – On the beautiful blue Danube, Bat City Review (USA), translated by Angela Rodel
- 2015 – Old Proud Mountain, Words Without Borders (USA), translated by Angela Rodel
- 2015 – Zły książę, Dialog (Poland), Stage play translated by Hanna Karpińska
- February 2019 – Excerpts from Atlantic Express, Bulgarian roses, and Mr. M, Ninth Letter Anthology (USA), edited and with introduction by Philip Graham, translated by Traci Speed

== Filmography ==
He is the author and co-author of scripts for feature and documentary films, distinguished at the:

- 70th Venice Film Festival (Fedeora Preis);
- Warsaw International Festival (Grand Prix);
- 17th Sofia Film Fest;
- Leipzig International Documentary Film Festival (Golden Dove Award, International Competition, eligible for the Oscars); etc.

In 2014 he was inducted into the European Film Academy. Winner of the Prix Europa – Berlin, European Radio Drama of the Year. He is a Script Consultant for the films "The Wolfpack" (Sundance Film Festival – Grand Jury Prize for Documentary Film) and "Aga" (Berlinale).

- Alienation (2013), (co-written with M.Lazarov, K. Todorov); director: Milko Lazarov; with Christos Stergioglou, Mariana Zhikich. World premiere at the 10th edition of Venice Days (Venice Film Festival), Official Selection; winning the FEDORA Award (Federation of Film Critics of Europe) and special mention of the "Europe Cinemas Label". Awarded The KCB Award for 'Best Bulgarian feature' at the 17th Sofia International Film Festival. Grand prize in the "1–2 competition" at the 29th Warsaw International Film Festival, “for the unadorned and poetic narration of a fundamental theme.”
- Houben Paints Money (2012), documentary; writer and director.
- Holy Light (2010), writer and director.
