= Individual involvement in the Chernobyl disaster =

People involved in the nuclear accident

The individual involvement in the Chernobyl disaster refers to the roles and experiences of the personnel present at the Chernobyl Nuclear Power Plant during the catastrophic nuclear accident on April 26, 1986. The disaster, rated the highest level 7 on the International Nuclear Event Scale, was caused by a combination of operator error and reactor design flaws during a safety test.

At 01:23 MSD (Moscow Summer Time) on April 26, 1986, an explosion at Reactor Number 4 spread debris and radioactive material across the surrounding area and into the atmosphere. Of around 600 workers present on the site during the early morning of 26 April 1986, hundreds received very high radiation doses with 134 of them being diagnosed officially with radiation sickness. This article details the specific actions and experiences of these individuals and others who responded in the immediate aftermath.

== Individuals present on 26 April ==
=== Anatoly Stepanovich Dyatlov ===
Dyatlov, the deputy chief engineer, supervised the test. At the moment the reactor power slipped to 30 MW, Dyatlov reported that he was out of the control room and inspecting equipment elsewhere in the plant. Dyatlov stated that Akimov and Toptunov were already raising power upon his return, and that if they had not done so, he would have ordered them to. In testimony at the trial, several witnesses recalled Dyatlov remaining in the room but did not report any disagreements or "serious discussions" related to the increase in power or at any other point during the test. When the reactor power had decreased to approximately 500 MW, the reactor power control was switched from local automatic regulator to the automatic regulators, manually to maintain the required power level.[21]: 11 AR-1 then activated, removing all four of AR-1's control rods automatically, but AR-2 failed to activate due to an imbalance in its ionization chambers. Toptunov reduced the power set-point to stabilize the automatic regulators' ionization sensors. The result was a sudden power drop to an unintended near-shutdown state, with a power output of 30 MW thermal or less. The circumstances that caused the power drop are unknown. Most reports attribute the power drop to Toptunov's error, but Dyatlov reported that it was due to a fault in the AR-2 system.[21]: 11

The power was stabilized at 200 MW at around 1:00 a.m., and the turbine rundown test was begun. A little under a minute after the beginning of the test, Dyatlov reports that Toptunov pressed the AZ-5 (scram) button to shut down the reactor upon completion of the test, and in accordance with maintenance which had already been scheduled for the weekend of April 26–27. Approximately three seconds after the initiation of the scram, the reactor underwent a power excursion, rising to 520 MW (thermal). As the control rods dropped into the core, the graphite displacers that made up the last few meters of the rods introduced additional moderation and hence reactivity into the reactor system. The first shocks occurred as the control rods were falling, and the subsequent damage prevented their further insertion into the reactor. Dyatlov's first concern after the explosion was that an accident in the deaerators immediately above the control room could result in boiling water raining down from the ceiling. He ordered everyone to evacuate to the backup control room, but no other operators left the room and Dyatlov soon countermanded his instructions. Other plant workers arrived in the control room, reporting damage.

Dyatlov went to the backup control room, pressing the AZ-5 button there and disconnecting power to the control rod servodrives. He initially ordered Kudryavtsev and Proskuryakov to lower the jammed control rods by hand (rubble initially prevented them from carrying out these orders) and attempted to countermand his order upon realizing its futility soon after, but Kudryavtsev and Proskuryakov had already left. Dyatlov recalls this as his only mistaken command from that night. After witnessing the fallen roof, fires and spilling oil in the turbine hall, Dyatlov ordered Akimov to call the fire brigade. In the corridor, he met Genrikh and Kurguz and sent them to the medical station. Realizing the magnitude of the disaster, Dyatlov suspended coolant supply to the reactor, although pumping of water would be resumed by order of Chief Engineer Nikolai Fomin around dawn. Dosimetrist Samoilenko reported that radiation levels in the left hand and central sections of the control room were 500–800 μR/s (micro-Roentgen per second), while readings were off the charts (over 1000 μR/s or 3.6 Roentgen per hour) on the right hand side of the control room. Dyatlov ordered Akimov to send Toptunov and Kirschenbaum (everyone but Stolyarchuk and Akimov) to the Unit 3 control room because they were of no further use, but Toptunov ultimately returned to the control room to retrieve the operator's log and remained on duty at Unit 4. Around 3:00 a.m., Dyatlov instructed Babishev to relieve Akimov on duty, but Akimov also remained at his post.

Dyatlov ran to the control room of Block 3 and instructed Rogozhkin to shut down reactor 3, overriding the latter's objections that Bryukhanov's permission was needed. Dyatlov then returned to control room 4 and ordered Akimov to call the daytime shift and get people to the affected unit; namely Lelechenko, whose crew had to remove hydrogen from the generator 8 electrolyzer. Dyatlov then received the report of Perevozchenko that pump operator Khodemchuk was still unaccounted for. Perevozchenko led Dyatlov and Aleksandr Yuvchenko on a brief and unsuccessful search for Khodemchuk, in corridors where the 1000 μR/s dosimeters reached their maximum. During the night, Dyatlov and Yuri Tregub went to survey the plant from the outside. Tregub recalled telling him "this is Hiroshima" to which Dyatlov replied, "Not in my nightmares have I seen anything like this". Around 5:00 a.m., already feeling ill, Dyatlov made a brief report to Bryukhanov in the Civil Defense Bunker, showing him the final printouts of reactor parameters leading up to the explosion. Dyatlov did not report the destruction of the reactor, but speculated that the accident was due to some malfunction of the Control and Protection System. Dyatlov was overcome by weakness and nausea in the bunker and went to the medical unit with Gorbachenko. Fomin replaced him at his post with Anatoly Sitnikov.

=== Aleksandr Fyodorovich Akimov ===
Akimov, the unit shift chief, was in charge of the test. He took over the shift at midnight from Tregub, who stayed on the site. At 1:23:04 a.m., the test began, and the main circulation pumps started cavitating due to the extremely high temperature of inlet water. The coolant started boiling in the reactor, and because of a combination of a positive void coefficient and xenon burnout, the power began to increase dramatically. At ~1:23:30 a.m., Toptunov asked Akimov whether he should shutdown the reactor for the planned maintenance. Akimov showed a gesture to Toptunov to press AZ-5. Toptunov pressed the button at 1:23:39. A second later, at 1:23:40 the SKALA computer registered the command. Akimov and many others heard a sound described as a Volga car failing to start up followed by two explosions. The room went black.

When the explosions occurred, the air filled with dust, there was a power cut and only battery-powered emergency lights stayed on. Perevozchenko ran into the control room, reporting the collapse of the reactor top. Brazhnik ran in from the turbine hall, reporting fire there. Brazhnik, Akimov, Davletbayev, and Palamarchuk ran into the turbine hall, having seen scattered debris and fires on levels 0 and +12. Akimov called the fire station and the chiefs of electrical and other departments, asking for electrical power for coolant pumps, removal of hydrogen from the generators, and other emergency procedures to stabilize the plant and contain the damage.

Internal telephone lines were disabled; Akimov sent Palamarchuk to contact Gorbachenko. Kudryavtsev and Proskuryakov returned from the reactor and reported its state to Akimov and Dyatlov. Insisting the reactor was intact, Akimov ordered Stolyarchuk and Busygin to turn on the emergency feed-water pumps. Davletbayev reported loss of electrical power, torn cables, and electric arcs. Akimov sent Metlenko to help in the turbine hall with manual opening of the cooling system valves, which was expected to take at least four hours per valve. At 3:30 a.m., Telyatnikov contacted Akimov, asking what was happening to his firemen; Akimov sent him a dosimetrist. Akimov, already nauseated, was replaced at 6 a.m., by the unit chief Vladimir Alekseyevich Babychev. Despite this, Akimov, together with Toptunov, stayed in the plant. Believing the water flow to the reactor to be blocked by a closed valve somewhere, they went to the half-destroyed feed-water room on level +27.

Together with Nekhayev, Orlov, and Uskov, they opened the valves on the two feed-water lines, then climbed over to level +27 and, almost knee-deep in a mixture of fuel and water, opened two valves on the 300 line. Due to advancing radiation poisoning caused by a dose of over 15 grays (4 being the LD50), they did not have the strength to open the valves on the sides. Akimov and Toptunov spent half an hour turning the valves; the radioactive water in room 714/2 was half submerging the pipeline. Viktor Smagin went in to open the third valves, spent 20 minutes in the room, and received 3 grays. By 7:45 the group made their way back to the control room of unit 4, here Akimov apologised exclaiming that they were unable to fully restart feed-water flow; before running to vomit into a bin. Though he tried his best to explain the work to the next shift, he was unable to stop vomiting and so was ordered along with Toptunov and Nekhaev to make their way to the infirmary; they were still wearing their soaking wet clothes. Akimov was evacuated to the hospital in Pripyat where he was put on an intravenous drip, his skin now a greyish brown. He along with Toptunov were selected as part of the first 28 people to be evacuated to Moscow for specialised treatment at the 6th clinic there. By 28 April, the effects of his exposure had largely subsided and he was able to talk and smoke with his colleagues. His condition quickly worsened, his gastrointestinal system and bone marrow ravaged by the radiation, his skin now swollen and charcoal black. Interrogations proved difficult as he was unable to talk. He was selected for receiving a fetal liver cell transplant. He died on the 10th May, two weeks after the accident due to skin and intestinal injuries. Until his death, he insisted he had done everything correctly and had made no mistakes.

=== Nikolai Gorbachenko ===
Gorbachenko, a radiation monitoring technician, began his shift and checked in unit 3; he skipped the check of unit 4 as it was being shut down, so at the moment of the accident he was in the duty room. A flat and powerful thud shook the building; he and his assistant Pshenichnikov thought it was a water hammer occurring during a turbine shutdown. Another flat thud followed, accompanied by lights going out, the control panel of unit 4 losing signal, latched double doors being blown apart by the blast, and black and red powder falling from the ventilation; emergency lights then switched on. Telephone connection with unit 4 was cut.

The corridor to the deaerator galleries was full of steam and white dust. The radiation counters went off the scale, and the high-range one burned out when switched on; the portable instruments were capable of showing at most 4 roentgens per hour (36 nA/kg), while the radiation on the roof ranged between 2,000 and 15,000 roentgens per hour (18 and 130 μA/kg). He went to the turbine hall to survey the damage, saw scattered pieces of concrete and returned to the duty room. Meeting two men there, they went to search for Vladimir Shashenok, found him unconscious in a damaged instrument room and carried him down. Gorbachenko returned to his post and changed clothes and shoes. He was then ordered to look for Valery Khodemchuk, but couldn't find him. He went to the control room and with Anatoly Dyatlov went outside to survey the reactor building. At 5 a.m., he began feeling weak and vomiting and was transported to a hospital, from where he was released on 27 October.

=== Valery Khodemchuk ===
Khodemchuk, the night shift main circulating pump operator, was likely killed immediately; he was stationed in the collapsed part of the building, in the far end of the southern main circulating pumps engine room at level +10. His body was never recovered and is entombed in the nuclear reactor's debris.

=== Vladimir Shashenok ===
Shashenok, the automatic systems adjuster from Atomenergonaladka—the Chernobyl startup and adjustment enterprise—was supposed to be in room 604, the location of the measurement and control instruments, on the upper landing across the turbine room, on level +24, under the reactor feedwater unit; he was reporting the states of the pressure gauges of the profile of the multiple forced circulation circuits to the computer room by telephone. The communication lines were cut during the explosion. Shashenok received deep thermal and radiation burns over his entire body when the overpressure spike destroyed the isolation membranes and the impulse pipes of the manometers in his instrument room just before the explosion, which then demolished the room itself. The landing was found damaged, covered with ankle-deep water, and there were leaks of boiling water and radioactive steam. Shashenok was found unconscious in room 604, pinned under a fallen beam, with bloody foam coming out of his mouth.

His body was severely contaminated by radioactive water. He was carried out by Gorbachenko and Pyotr Palamarchuk and died at 6 a.m. in the Pripyat hospital under care of the chief physician, Vitaly Leonenko, without regaining consciousness. Gorbachenko suffered a radiation burn on his back where Shashenok's hand was located when he helped carry him out. Khodemchuk and Shashenok were the first two victims of the disaster. A report by the Associated Press at the time, citing Soviet newspaper Pravda, claimed that Shashenok was buried two days later at a village near Chernobyl. His wife Lyudmilla had been evacuated before the burial and was not there. A year later he was exhumed and re-buried beside his 29 fellow workers at Moscow's Mitinskoe Cemetery.

=== Oleg Genrikh and Anatoly Kurguz ===
Genrikh, an operator of the control room on level +36, was taking a nap in a windowless room adjacent to the control room. The window in the control room was broken and the lights went out. His colleague Kurguz was in the control room with three open doors between him and the reactor room; at the moment of the explosion, he suffered severe burns from steam entering the control room. Genrikh received less serious burns as he was protected by the windowless room. The stairs on the right side were damaged; he managed to escape by the stairs on the left. On the way back they were joined by Simeonov and Simonenko, the gas loop operators, all four heading to the control room. Kurguz was shortly afterwards evacuated by an ambulance; aware of dangers of radiation contamination, Genrikh took a shower and changed his clothes.

=== Aleksandr Yuvchenko ===
Yuvchenko, an engineer, was in his office between reactors 3 and 4, on level 12.5; he described the event as a shock wave that buckled walls, blew doors in, and brought a cloud of milky grey radioactive dust and steam. The lights went out. He met a badly burned, drenched and shocked Viktor Degtyarenko, who asked him to rescue Khodemchuk; that quickly proved impossible as that part of the building did not exist anymore. Yuvchenko, together with the foreman Yuri Tregub, ran out of the building and saw half of the building gone and the reactor emitting a blue ionized air glow. They returned to the building and met Valeri Perevozchenko and two junior technicians, Kudryavtsev and Proskuryakov, ordered by Dyatlov to manually lower the presumably seized control rods. Tregub went to report the extent of damage to the control room.

The four climbed a stairwell to level 35 to survey the damage; Yuvchenko held open the massive door into the reactor room and the other three proceeded in to locate the control rod mechanism; after no more than a minute in the hallway near the entrance to the reactor hall, all three had sustained fatal doses of radiation.

The three would later die in the Moscow hospital. Yuvchenko meanwhile suffered serious beta burns and gamma burns to his left shoulder, hip and calf as he kept the radioactive-dust-covered door open. It was later estimated he received a dose of 4.1 Sv. At 3 a.m., he began vomiting intensely; by 6 a.m., he could no longer walk. He later spent a year in the Moscow hospital receiving blood and plasma transfusions and received numerous skin grafts. Yuvchenko died of leukemia in November 2008, aged 47.

=== Valery Perevozchenko ===
Perevozchenko, the reactor section foreman, was in his office at the start of his shift. He went around inspecting the North and South Main Circulation Pump halls. After finding an issue with a pipe, he went to Alexander Yuvchenko's office to discuss the issue. They decided they should not bother Unit 4 operators during the test, so they went to Unit 3, and found Alexander Agulov. While both men were heading to the North MCP hall to speak with Khodemchuk, Perevozchenko was called to the Unit 4 control room for an urgent matter, so he parted with Yuvchenko and made his way to CR-4, arriving shortly before the test began.

After the explosion, Alexander Akimov had ordered that the ECCS pumps to be started from the automatic emergency diesel generators, and orders Valery Perevozchenko to open the system valves. He returned to the control room after an unsuccessful attempt to get to the tank where there are valves connecting the water supply to the primary system pumps. The entrance to the room was covered in debris, impossible to get into, so he made his way back to the Unit 4 Control Room, arriving at around 1:27.

He spotted Viktor Proskuryakov and Alexander Kudryatsev, who attempted and failed to enter the reactor hall from the western entrance, and decides to lead them to an alternative route to the eastern entrance via the staircase 001/4. On their way, they are spotted by Yuri Bagdasarov, outside the Unit 3 control room. He yells at the three, ordering them to leave, however they continue.

Yuvchenko and Tregub encountered the three men, and after they explained that they were going to the Unit 4 reactor hall to try to manually lower the rods, Yuvchenko’s protested, stating the reactor is destroyed, however Perevozchenko responds that they still have to try. As Yuvchenko is the only one with a flashlight, he joins Perevozchenko, Proskuryakov and Kudryastev, as Tregub returns to the Control Room to report the damage. On their way, they encounter Agulov, and he is ordered by Perevozchenko to close the compressed air supply to Unit 4.

At around 1:48, the 4 men reach a small ledge on +35.5, with an elevator, the stairwell they ascended, and the door to the eastern side of the reactor hall. Perevozchenko, Proskuryakov and Kudryatsev entered the reactor hall while Yuvchenko held the door. After seeing the blazing reactor for no more than 15 seconds, they left and informed Yuvchenko there was nothing they could do.

Returning to the Unit 4 control room, they are ordered by Dyatlov to open the valves allowing for water to drain from the turbine hall to the bubbler pools. Despite Yuvchenko protesting, they leave.

Upon returning to the Unit 4 control room, Perevozchenko dismisses Kudryatsev and Proskuryakov, while Perevozchenko and Yuvchenko take a break to smoke a cigarette.

During this break, Perevozchenko was informed by Akimov that 3 workers, Valery Khodemchuk, Anatoly Kurguz and Oleg Genrikh were missing. He eventually reported back to Akimov that Genrikh and Kurguz had been found and taken away on ambulances, however Khodemchuk had not yet been found. At around 2:45, Perevozchenko, along with Dyatlov and Yuvchenko, plus an unnamed dosimetrist, went to the now destroyed North MCP hall to search for Khodemchuk, who unbeknownst to them, had been crushed during the explosion. After reaching the entrance to the North MCP hall, the dosimeter went off its scale of 3.6 roentgens per hour, so the dosimetrist left, leaving his device with Perevozchenko, Dyatlov and Yuvchenko.

Yuvchenko, who was trying to reach a specific region of the debris where he believed Khodemchuk could be, clambered through the rubble, though he had no luck in finding Khodemchuk, and this would give him a severe dose of radiation. Failing to find Khodemchuk, Perevozchenko, Yuvchenko and Dyatlov went back to the Unit 4 control room.

Half an hour later, Perevozchenko and Yuvchenko met up with Agulov where they began searching the building, calling out Khodemchuk's name. Returning to the North MCP hall without Agulov, Perevozchenko had located a wooden board and placed it over the debris. At risk of water splashing him, falling into a cavity and getting trapped, or a lethal dose of radiation, he crawled over the debris toward room 235 where he believed Khodemchuk was trapped. He reached 435 however was unable to locate Khodemchuk.

Parting ways with Yuvchenko whom went with Agulov to search the sub reactor rooms, Perevozchenko began suffering the early affects of Acute Radiation Sickness, and an hour later, at 4:40, he alongside Yuvchenko were found in the Unit 3 control room by Agulov, who found Perevozchenko leaning against a table and Yuvchenko had collapsed on a desk, clutching at his stomach. Perevozchenko asks for Agulov to help them both out of the building to the ABK-1 building to be taken away by ambulance. Agulov agrees, and they slowly make their way out of the building, with Yuvchenko periodically stopping to empty the contents of his stomach. After reaching ABK-1, both men were taken away by ambulance to Pripyat Hospital number 126, and Agulov turned back to continue his work.

=== Vyacheslav Brazhnik, Pyotr Palamarchuk and Razim Davletbayev ===
Brazhnik, the senior turbine machinist operator, ran into the control room to report fire in the turbine hall. Palamarchuk, the Chernobyl enterprise group supervisor, together with Davletbayev, followed him back to the turbine room. They witnessed fires on levels 0 and +12, broken oil and water pipes, roof debris on top of turbine 7, and scattered pieces of reactor graphite and fuel, with the linoleum on the floor burning around them.

Palamarchuk unsuccessfully attempted to contact Shashenok in room 604, then ran around the turbo generator 8, down to level 0 and urged the two men from the Kharkov mobile laboratory, assigned to record the turbine 8 vibrations, to leave; they, however, had both already received a lethal radiation dose. Akimov asked Palamarchuk to look for Gorbachenko and then rescue Shashenok as the communication with the dosimetry room was cut. Palamarchuk met Gorbachenko by the staircase on level +27, then they together found and recovered Shashenok's unconscious body.

=== Aleksandr Kudryavtsev and Viktor Proskuryakov ===
Kudryavtsev and Proskuryakov, the SIUR trainees from other shifts, were present to watch Toptunov. After the explosion they were sent by Dyatlov to the central hall to turn the handles of the system for manual lowering of the presumably seized control rods. They ran through the de-aerator gallery to the right to the VRSO unit elevator, found it destroyed, so climbed up the staircase instead, towards level 36; they missed Kurguz and Genrikh, who used another stairwell. Level 36 was destroyed, covered with rubble.

They met Perevozchenko and Yuvchenko, then went through a narrow corridor towards the central hall. Proskuryakov shone a flashlight around the corner into the reactor hall, which later resulted in severe burns appearing on his hand.

=== Viktor Bryukhanov ===
Bryukhanov, the plant manager, arrived at 2:30 a.m. Akimov reported a serious radiation accident but intact reactor, fires in the process of being extinguished, and a second emergency water pump being readied to cool the reactor. Due to limitations of available instruments, they seriously underestimated the radiation level. At 3 a.m., Bryukhanov called Maryin, the deputy secretary for the nuclear power industry, reporting Akimov's version of the situation.

Maryin sent the message further up the chain of command, to Frolyshev, who then called Vladimir Dolgikh. Dolgikh subsequently called General Secretary Mikhail Gorbachev and other members of the Politburo. At 4 a.m., Moscow ordered feeding of water to the reactor. As Director of the Chernobyl site, Bryukhanov was sentenced to ten years imprisonment but only served five years of the sentence.

The first director of the Chernobyl nuclear power plant, Viktor Petrovich Bryukhanov, died on October 13, 2021, at the age of 85.

=== Nikolai Fomin ===
Nikolai Fomin, the chief engineer, arrived in the block 4 control room at 4:30 a.m. He ordered continuous feeding of water into the reactor, which was already in progress by emergency pump 2 from the deaerators. Fomin kept pressing the staff to feed water to the reactor and transferred more people to unit 4 to replace those being disabled by radiation.

After Dyatlov was evacuated by ambulance, Fomin, Bryukhanov and Parashin sent Sitnikov to assess damage around Unit 4.

Fomin attempted suicide following the disaster. He was found guilty of criminal mismanagement in 1988 for his role in causing the disaster, and sentenced to 10 years in prison. He was released early, spending some time in a psychiatric hospital before later working at Kalininskaya Nuclear Power Plant.

=== Vladimir Pravik and Viktor Kibenok ===
Vladimir Pravik and Viktor Kibenok were both shift commanders of their respective fire departments (Militarized Fire Department No.2 & Paramilitary Fire Department No.6) and were first responding firefighters to the disaster.

Pravik commanded the first firefighters to arrive on scene at 1:28 AM. He arrived on the north side of the reactor building, and upon seeing the destroyed power unit, called for a stage 3 alarm, summoning all available fire departments in the Kyiv Oblast. He entered the unit 4 transport corridor and spoke with a plant worker, who suggested the roof of the turbine hall was on fire. Pravik ordered his men to move to the turbine hall and begin tackling the fire there. Pravik continued into the plant. He entered the turbine hall and asked the workers there if there was anything to be done, but they told him the fires there were under control and no assistance was needed.

At 1:35 am, Viktor Kibenok arrived on scene with 9 firemen in 3 vehicles from Pripyat, initially along the turbine hall. Pravik spoke to Kibenok over the radio, and requested that he redeploys his vehicles to the north side of the reactor building, as the roof of the ventilation block had begun to burn and there was a risk of the fire spreading to the roof of reactor 3, which was still operational. By 1:47 am, Kibenok's vehicles were parked underneath the VSRO building, to the rear of unit 3. Kibenok used his mechanical ladder truck to climb to the roof of the VSRO building with two firemen, and he began supervising fire extinguishing efforts on the roof of the VSRO building.

In the meantime, reinforcements from the town of Chernobyl arrived in the form of two fire engines. Pravik began assembling a squad to climb to the roof of the third unit to extinguish the fires there. At around 1:50 am Pravik, and a squad of four other firefighters, (Vasily Ignatenko, Nikolai Titenok, Nikolai Vashchuk and Vladimir Tishura) began climbing to the roof, using the fire escape staircase on the northern face of unit 3. The squad reached the roof at 2:00 am, and Pravik determined the fires on the roof of the ventilation block needed to be extinguished in order to protect reactor 3. At 2:05 am, Pravik reported over the radio: "Explosion in the reactor compartment of the fourth block", presumably after looking into the reactor hall from the roof of the vent block.

After hearing this radio report, Viktor Kibenok climbed to the roof of the ventilation block, possibly out of curiosity—a decision that would ultimately cost him his life. The firefighters on the roof soon discovered their hoses were ineffective against the burning pieces of superheated graphite, as the water from the hoses evaporated before making contact with the graphite blocks, which were burning at hundreds of degrees Celsius, so they began attempting to stomp out the glowing blocks instead. At this point, the bitumen covering on the roof had begun to melt, making it difficult to move around, as it stuck to their boots.

At around 2:16 am, the firemen on the roof of the ventilation block began to succumb to the early symptoms of acute radiation sickness. Vladimir Tishura collapsed first, vomiting uncontrollably, shortly followed by Nikolai Titenok. Vasily Ignatenko and Kibenok assisted them down from the roof of unit 3. When they reached the fire escape staircase, they were met by Ivan Shavrey and Aleksandr Petrovsky as well as Anatoly Ivanchenko, who were already on their way up to reinforce Pravik's squad. Shavrey ordered Ivanchenko to help the weakened men down to the ground.

By 2:40 am, the squad of six men were taken to Sanitary Unit No.126 in Pripyat by ambulance. Kibenok had an unusually positive outlook on the whole situation, reportedly stating to Pravik that it was: "one of the best nights of his life". Even during their initial hospitalization at Moscow Hospital No.6, Kibenok grasped Pravik by the shoulder and exclaimed: "Come on brother, we'll drink the cup more than once!". However, a week into May, their conditions began to worsen. They both died on May 11, 1986.

On September 25, 1986, both lieutenants were posthumously named Heroes of the Soviet Union.

== Engineers who drained the steam suppression pools ==
On May 6, 1986, plant mechanical engineers Oleksiy Ananenko, Valery Bespalov, and Boris Baranov, navigated through a series of underground corridors located beneath the fourth reactor building, which had become flooded by firefighting and coolant water in the days prior, to locate and open two release valves to drain the water. Each engineer wore two dosimeters (one attached to the chest, another one around the ankle). Ananenko, who was familiar with the layout, brought an adjustable spanner, which he planned to use in case the valve became stuck. The men moved quickly to prevent acute radiation exposure. The mission was completed without complication.

In 2018, the three men were awarded the Order For Courage by Ukrainian President Petro Poroshenko. During the April 2018 ceremony, with the Chernobyl New Safe Confinement structure in the background, Poroshenko noted that the three men had been quickly forgotten at the time, with the Soviet news agency still hiding many of the details of the catastrophe. It had previously been reported that all three had died and been buried in "tightly sealed zinc coffins". Ananenko and Bespalov received their awards in person, while Baranov, who died in 2005 of a heart attack, was awarded his posthumously.

== Tables ==
=== Operators and Engineers ===
| Name | Date of death | Role | Notes |
|---|---|---|---|
| Aleksandr F. Akimov | 11 May 1986 | Unit 4 shift leader | Akimov was in the control room with Toptunov at the reactor control panel at the moment of the explosion. Received a fatal dose of 1,500 rad during attempts to restart feedwater flow into the reactor; posthumously awarded the Order For Courage. |
| Yuri Y. Badaev | | SKALA computer operator | In the SKALA room at the moment of the explosion. |
| Anatoly I. Baranov | 20 May 1986 | Electrical engineer | Posthumously awarded the Order For Courage. |
| Nikolai S. Bondarenko | | Oxygen–nitrogen station operator | At the moment of the explosion stationed in the nitrogen-oxygen station, 200 meters (660 ft) from block 4. |
| Vitaly I. Borets | | | Former Leningrad Nuclear Power Plant block shift leader; in charge of preparation of the test, would supervise it according to the original schedule, asked his colleagues to cancel it due to the state of the reactor. Went home for the night, was called on-site to assist with post-accident situation. |
| Vyacheslav S. Brazhnik | 14 May 1986 | Senior turbine operator | In the turbine hall at the moment of explosion; received fatal dose (about 1,290 rad) during firefighting and stabilizing the turbine hall, died in Moscow hospital; posthumously awarded the Order For Courage; irradiated by a piece of fuel lodged on a nearby transformer of turbogenerator 7 during manual opening of the turbine emergency oil drain valves. |
| Vladimir A. Chugunov | | Reactor stop 1 deputy director | Radiation burn on right side, right hand, received a potentially lethal radiation dose during post-accident site survey suffering from ARS of the 3rd degree. |
| Razim I. Davletbayev | 15 Mar 2017 | Deputy head of Unit 4 turbine division | In control room at desk T with Kirschenbaum at the moment of explosion. Assessed the damage in and around the Turbine Hall following the explosion. |
| Viktor M. Degtyarenko | 19 May 1986 | Reactor operator | At the moment of explosion close to the pumps; posthumously awarded the Order For Courage, face scalded by steam or hot water, received a lethal dose of 460 rad and died in Moscow hospital. |
| G. A. Dik | | Plant employee | Morning shift. |
| Anatoly S. Dyatlov | 13 Dec 1995 | Deputy Chief Engineer, Units 3 and 4 | In the control room with Akimov and Toptunov at the time of the explosion. Exposed to radiation dose of 650 rem. Arrested in August 1986, spent a year in a Kiev prison awaiting trial; found guilty of gross violation of safety regulations. Sentenced to 10 years in a labor camp, served three. Released due to ill health in 1990. |
| M. A. Elshin | | Thermal plant automation and measurement, shift leader | Present in the control room when the reactor power dropped; returned to his office when power was stabilized, where he was during the explosion. |
| Sergei N. Gazin | | Turbo generator chief engineer | Worked the 4 to 12 p.m. shift; stayed to watch the test; in control room at desk T with Kirschenbaum at the moment of explosion. |
| Nikolai F. Gorbachenko | | Dosimetrist | Gorbachenko rescued with Palamarchuk the unconscious Shashenok. |
| Aleksander A. Kavunets | | Turbine repair department chief | |
| Valery I. Khodemchuk | 26 Apr 1986 | Main circulating pumps, senior operator | Stationed in the northern main circulating pumps engine room, likely killed immediately; body never found, likely buried under the wreckage of the steam separator drums; has a memorial plaque on the west side of the phase 2 ventilation building; posthumously awarded the Order For Courage. |
| Igor Kirschenbaum | | Turbine control senior engineer (SIUT), deputy head of unit 4 turbine section | Present in the control room, desk T, at the moment of explosion; in charge of switching off the turbo generator 8 and starting its spindown. |
| Yuri I. Konoval | 28 May 1986 | Electrician | Received a fatal dose of 830 rad and died in Moscow Hospital. Posthumously awarded the Order For Courage. |
| Yuri V. Korneev | 2021 | Turbine equipment machinist-inspector | In the turbine hall at moment of explosion during firefighting and stabilizing the turbine hall. |
| Alesandr. P. Kovalenko | | Reactor 4 supervisor | Former Tomsk-7 worker; received dose of radiation during post-accident survey; demoted but allowed to continue work while awaiting trial; found guilty of violating safety regulations, sentenced to three years in a labor camp. |
| Aleksandr H. Kudryavtsev | 14 May 1986 | SIUR trainee | Present in the control room at the moment of explosion; received a fatal dose of radiation (560 rad) during attempt to manually lower the control rods as he approached the reactor hall; posthumously awarded the Order For Courage. |
| Aleksandr A. Kukhar | | Chief of electrical laboratory | At the central control room with Lelechenko; at the moment of explosion just arrived to the block 4 control room. |
| Anatoly K. Kurguz | 12 May 1986 | Operator, central hall | Scalded by radioactive steam entering his control room; his colleague, Oleg Genrikh, in a room close by was spared the worst and they made their way to hospital. Unfortunately, on top of the thermal burns he suffered, he had received a fatal dose of 670 rad and died 16 days later in a Moscow hospital. Genrikh, having received 3rd-degree ARS, would recover. |
| Nikolai G. Kuryavchenko | | SKALA computer operator, electromechanic (DES), block 3 | In block 3. |
| Aleksandr G. Lelechenko | 7 May 1986 | Plant worker, deputy chief of the electrical shop | Former Leningrad Nuclear Power Plant electrical shop shift leader; at the central control room with Kukhar; at the moment of explosion just arrived to the block 4 control room; to spare his younger colleagues radiation exposure he himself went through radioactive water and debris three times to switch off the electrolyzers and the feed of hydrogen to the generators, then tried to supply voltage to feedwater pumps; after receiving first aid, returned to the plant and worked for several more days. Suffered 4th-degree ARS after receiving 1,200 rad and died in a Kiev hospital 10 days later. |
| Viktor I. Lopatyuk | 17 May 1986 | Electrician | Received fatal dose (650 rad) during switching off the electrolyzer. |
| Grigoriy V. Lysyuk | | Electrician, shop chief | At the moment of the explosion in the control room; in charge of issuing the simulated Maximum Projected Accident signal on Metlenko's command. |
| Gennady P. Metlenko | | Senior brigade electrical engineer | At the moment of explosion present with two assistants in the N area of the control room, at the oscillographs; supposed to monitor the slowdown rate of the spinning down turbo generator, and its electrical characteristics, worked together with Kirschenbaum; after the explosion sent to help in the turbine hall but sent back from there. |
| Aleksandr A. Nekhaev | 2017 | | Morning shift, helped Akimov and Toptunov opening the valves to feed water to the reactor through steam separator drums and main circulation pumps in room 714/2. Suffered 3rd-degree ARS after receiving 700 rad. Had both legs amputated, but survived. |
| Oleksandr V. Novyk | 26 Jul 1986 | Turbine equipment machinist-inspector | Received fatal dosage of 1,200 rad during firefighting and stabilizing the turbine hall; posthumously awarded the Order For Courage; irradiated by a piece of fuel lodged on a nearby transformer of the turbo generator 7 during attempts to call the control room. |
| Pyotr Palamarchuk | | Chernobyl enterprise group supervisor | Palamarchuk rescued together with Gorbachenko the unconscious Shashenok. |
| Kostyantyn H. Perchuk | 20 May 1986 | Turbine operator, senior engineer | In the turbine hall at the moment of explosion; received fatal dose (about 1,010 rad) during firefighting and stabilizing the turbine hall, died in Moscow hospital; posthumously awarded the Order For Courage; irradiated by a piece of fuel lodged on a nearby transformer of the turbogenerator 7 during manual opening of the turbine emergency oil drain valves. |
| Valery I. Perevozchenko | 13 Jun 1986 | Foreman, reactor section | Received fatal dose of 800 rad during attempt to locate and rescue Khodemchuk and others, approached the reactor hall together with Kudryavtsev and Proskuryakov; posthumously awarded the Order For Courage; radiation burns on side and back. |
| Georgi I. Popov | 13 Jun 1986 | Vibration specialist | Mobile laboratory in a vehicle at turbine 8; received a fatal dose (690 rad) and died in Moscow. Buried in Mitinskoe Cemetery. |
| Viktor V. Proskuryakov | 17 May 1986 | SIUR trainee | Present in the control room at the moment of explosion; received fatal dose of radiation while attempting to enter the reactor hall to manually lower the control rods; posthumously awarded the Order For Courage; suffered 100 percent radiation burns, most severely to his hands while shining a flashlight into the reactor hall. Taken with the second convoy to Moscow; case 62 and suffered 4th-degree ARS after received 720 rad. |
| Boris V. Rogozhkin | | Block shift leader | Supervisor of the 12 to 8 a.m. shift; after the disaster demoted, allowed to continue working in the plant while awaiting trial; found guilty of gross violation of safety regulations, sentenced to five years in a labor camp plus two years concurrently for negligence and unfaithful execution of duty. |
| Gennady Rusanovsky | 2017 | Main circulating pumps, second operator | Face scalded by steam. Found by Yuvchenko and assisted in searching for Khodemchuk before receiving medical attention. Was in the first convoy transporting the worst 26 affected, suffered 2nd-degree ARS after receiving 540 rad. |
| Aleksei V. Rysin | | Turbine operation senior engineer | |
| Volodomyr I. Savenkov | 21 May 1986 | Vibration specialist | Mobile laboratory in a vehicle at turbine 8; first person selected for transportation to Moscow (case number 1). Suffered 4th-degree ARS after receiving 770 rad. Received a bone marrow transplant but died 25 days after exposure in hospital; buried in Kharkov in a lead coffin. |
| Anatoly I. Shapovalov | 19 May 1986 | Electrician | Aided Konoval, Baranov, Lopatyuk and Lelechenko ultimately receiving ARS of the 4th degree with a dose of 1,160 rad. Posthumously awarded the Order For Courage |
| Vladimir N. Shashenok | 26 Apr 1986 | Automatic systems adjuster | Stationed in room 604, found unconscious and pinned down under a fallen beam, with broken spine, broken ribs, deep thermal and radiation burns. Died in hospital without regaining consciousness. |
| Anatoly V. Shlelyayn | | SKALA computer operator, senior officer (SDIVT), block 3 | In block 3. |
| Anatoly A. Sitnikov | 30 May 1986 | Deputy Chief Engineer, Units 1 and 2. | Part of the day shift, suffered ARS of the 3rd degree and died 34 days after the accident in Moscow. Received fatal dose of 530 rad while surveying damage to the plant and assisting with restarting coolant flow in room 714/2 to the reactor C. |
| Viktor G. Smagin | 23 Oct 2023 | Shift foreman, reactor 4 | Aided in restarting coolant flow to the reactor in room 714/2 where he spent 20 minutes close to the entrance. A few hours later experienced nausea and vomiting; suffered ARS of the 2nd degree having received 300 rad. |
| Boris Stolyarchuk | | Senior unit 4 control engineer | Present in the control room, desk P, at the moment of the explosion, controlling the feedwater and deaerator mechanisms. Later taken to Moscow Hospital where he was tested for ARS, potentially unconfirmed. |
| Leonid F. Toptunov | 14 May 1986 | SIUR, senior engineer for management of the reactor (reactor operator) | In the control room at the reactor control panel at the moment of explosion having been the person who pressed AZ-5. Dismissed by Dyatlov but returned to his post and along with Akimov, Nekhaev, Uskov and Orlov ventured to room 714/2 where he received a fatal dose of 1,300 rad during attempts to restart feedwater flow into the reactor. Unable to stop vomiting he was admitted to hospital and selected as one of the first 26 patients to be flown to Moscow where he died 18 days later; posthumously awarded the Order For Courage. |
| Andrey M. Tormozin | | Turbine equipment machinist-inspector | In the turbine hall at the moment of explosion during firefighting and stabilizing the turbine hall, survived. |
| Yuri Tregub | | Unit 4 shift leader | Head of the previous evening shift. Decided to stay in the control room and help the night shift carry out the test. After the explosion, went to survey the plant from the outside first with Yuvchenko and then with Dyatlov. Also ordered by Dyatlov to manually turn on the emergency high-pressure coolant water. Survived. |
| Arkady G. Uskov | | Reactor operator, senior engineer, block 1 | Suffered ARS of the 2nd degree having received a potentially fatal radiation dose of 400 rad when helping Orlov, Akimov and Toptunov to manually open cooling system valves. |
| V. F. Verkhovod | | SKALA computer operator, senior officer (SDIVT), block 4 | In the SKALA room at the moment of the explosion. |
| Yuri A. Vershynin | 21 Jul 1986 | Turbine equipment machinist-inspector | In the turbine hall at the moment of the explosion; received a fatal dose of about 920 rad during firefighting and stabilizing the turbine hall. Died in a Moscow hospital; posthumously awarded the Order For Courage; irradiated by a piece of fuel lodged on a nearby transformer of the turbogenerator 7 during attempts to call the control room. |
| Aleksandr Yuvchenko | 10 Nov 2008 | Senior mechanical engineer | Assisted with assessing damages to the reactor. Aided Perevozchenko, Proskuryakov and Kudryavstev in attempting to enter the reactor hall. Suffered 3rd-degree ARS after receiving 450 rad. Died due to acute leukemia. |

=== First Responders ===
| Name | Date of death | Role | Notes |
|---|---|---|---|
| Mikhail Golovnenko | 2005 | Firefighter | Fire engine driver from the Chernobyl Town Fire Department (PPC-17/ ППЧ-17) He arrived on scene at 1:47 AM and stayed on the north side of the reactor building until 6:00 AM. Received an approximate 140 REM dose; died in 2005. |
| Vasily I. Ignatenko | 13 May 1986 | Firefighter | A fireman from the Pripyat Fire Department (SWPCH-6/ СВПЧ-6). Arrived on scene at 1:35 AM under the command of Lieutenant Viktor Kibenok. He was the first man from his squad to reach the roof of reactor 3. Assisted in fire extinguishing efforts on the roof of the ventilation block and successfully prevented the fire from spreading to reactor 3. He carried two of his comrades down from the roof, despite being weakened by the radiation himself. Received a 1240–1440 REM dose. Died in Moscow Hospital No.6 17 days later. |
| Grigori M. Khmel | 8 Jan 2005 | Firefighter | Fire engine driver from the Chernobyl Town Fire Department (PPC-17/ ППЧ-17) He arrived on scene at 1:47 am and stayed on the north side of the reactor building until 6:00 AM. Participated in crucial work ensuring a constant water supply to Pravik's squad on the roof of the reactor building. Infamously picked up a piece of graphite from the ground near the VSRO building. |
| Viktor M. Kibenok | 11 May 1986 | Firefighter | Lieutenant, shift leader from the Pripyat Fire Department. Arrived on scene at 1:35 am, along with Lieutenant Pravik, coordinated firefighting deployments on the north side of the reactor building. Climbed to the roof of unit 3 at 2:05 am after Pravik reported over the radio that there had been an explosion in the reactor compartment. He received a fatal dose of radiation (900–1100 REM) whilst assisting and coordinating firefighting efforts on the roofs of the ventilation block and reactor 3. Died two weeks later. Posthumously became a Hero of the Soviet Union. |
| Oleksandr I. Petrovsky | 11 November 2026 | Firefighter | Firefighter from the nuclear power plant's fire station (ВПЧ-2). Among the first firemen to arrive at 1:28, assisted in fire extinguishing efforts on the roof of the turbine hall. Later moved to the north side of the plant at 2:20 am to reinforce Pravik's squad. Placed on fire watch on the roof of the ventilation block with Ivan Shavrey, however descended after a few minutes after he reportedly went temporarily blind. Received an approximate 210 REM dose. Alive as of 2021. |
| Vladimir Pravik | 11 May 1986 | Firefighter | Lieutenant, Shift leader of the nuclear plant's fire station. Commanded the first unit to arrive at 1:28. He called a stage 3 alert immediately upon seeing the destroyed reactor building. Held scene command until 2:00 am. Offered to guide Pripyat firefighters to the roof of reactor 3, as they didn't know the way. Coordinated firefighting efforts on the roof of the ventilation block, successfully preventing the spread of fire to reactor 3's roof. Likely the first person to look into the reactor core from the roof. Descended from the roof at 2:30 am but had already received a lethal dose of radiation (1420–1620 REM). Died two weeks later in Moscow Hospital No.6. Posthumously named a Hero of the Soviet Union. |
| Vladimir. I. Prishchepa | 1993 | Firefighter | Firefighter from the nuclear power plant's fire station (ВПЧ-2). Among the first firemen to arrive at 1:28, assisted in fire extinguishing on the roof of the turbine hall. He picked up two uranium fuel pellets and put them in his pockets to take as souvenirs. Received an approximate 160 REM dose, died in 1993. |
| Leonid Telyatnikov | 2 Dec 2004 | Firefighter | Major. Commanding officer of the nuclear plant's fire station (ВПЧ-2). He was on vacation at the time of the disaster and arrived at 1:47 AM. Took over scene command from Lieutenant Pravik and began his reconnaissance inside the plant. He held overall scene command until 4 AM, when he could no longer continue due to the onset symptoms of ARS. He received an estimated 450 REM dose, recovered from his treatment, and was named a Hero of the USSR in September 1986. Died from jaw cancer in December 2004. |
| Vladimir I. Tishura | 10 May 1986 | Firefighter | A fireman from the Pripyat Fire Department (SWPCH-6/ СВПЧ-6). Arrived on scene at 1:35 am under the command of Lieutenant Viktor Kibenok. Assisted in fire extinguishing efforts on the roof of the ventilation block and successfully prevented the fire from spreading to reactor 3. He was the first to collapse and had to be assisted down from the roof by his comrade Vasily Ignatenko. He received an estimated 1140–1340 REM dose and died in Moscow Hospital No.6 two weeks later, being the first fireman to die. He was posthumously named a Hero of Ukraine in 2006. |
| Nikolai I. Titenok | 16 May 1986 | Firefighter | A fireman from the Pripyat Fire Department (SWPCH-6/ СВПЧ-6). Arrived on scene at 1:35 am under the command of Lieutenant Viktor Kibenok. Assisted in fire extinguishing efforts on the roof of the ventilation block and successfully prevented the fire from spreading to reactor 3. He was the second fireman in his squad to collapse and had to be assisted down from the roof in his weakened state. He died two weeks later in Moscow Hospital No.6 after receiving an estimated 1300–1500 REM dose. He was the last fireman to die from ARS, and was posthumously named a Hero of Ukraine in 2006. |
| Mykola V. Vashchuk | 14 May 1986 | Firefighter | A fireman from the Pripyat Fire Department (SWPCH-6/ СВПЧ-6). Arrived on scene at 1:35 am under the command of Lieutenant Viktor Kibenok. Assisted in fire extinguishing efforts on the roof of the ventilation block and successfully prevented the fire from spreading to reactor 3. He notably ran hose lines to and from the roof multiple times. He received an estimated 1220–1420 REM dose and died two weeks later in Moscow Hospital No.6. He was posthumously named a Hero of Ukraine in 2006. |
| Ivan M. Shavrey | 20 Nov 2020 | Firefighter | Firefighter from the nuclear power plant's fire station (ВПЧ-2). Among the first firemen to arrive at 1:28 AM, assisted in fire extinguishing efforts on the roof of the turbine hall. Later moved to the north side of the plant at 2:20 am to reinforce Pravik's squad. Placed on fire watch on the roof of the ventilation block with Aleksandr Petrovsky, however descended after a few minutes after Petrovksy reportedly went temporarily blind. Received an approximate 220 REM dose. Died from complications stemming from COVID-19 during the COVID-19 pandemic. |
| Leonid M. Shavrey | 14 Apr 2012 | Firefighter | Firefighter from the nuclear power plant's fire station (ВПЧ-2). Among the first firemen to arrive at 1:28 am. Was the first man on the roof of the turbine hall. Placed on firewatch by Major Telyatnikov at 3:00 am and remained on the roof until 5:00 am. He was hospitalized with 2nd degree ARS, receiving an approximate 200 REM dose. He survived his treatment and died in 2012. |
| Petr G. Khmel | | Firefighter | Lieutenant, Shift leader of the nuclear plant's fire station. Wasn't on duty at the time of explosion and was drinking with his colleagues in Pripyat. Was called to respond at 2:30 am, he arrived close to 3:00 am and was apparently under the influence. He relieved firefighters and took over command on the roof of the turbine hall. He remained on the roof until 6:00 am when he could no longer continue. Received an approximate 180 REM dose. Alive as of 2024. |
| Anatoly A. Zakharov | | Firefighter | Fire engine driver from the nuclear power plant's fire station (ВПЧ-2). Among the first firemen to arrive at 1:28 am. Ensured a consistent supply of water to the roof of the turbine hall. Stayed on site until 3:00 am. Received an estimated 200 REM dose. Alive as of 2022. |

=== Others ===
| Name | Date of death | Role | Notes |
|---|---|---|---|
| Viktor P. Bryukhanov | 13 Oct 2021 | Plant director | Stripped of Communist party membership after disaster. Arrested in August 1986, spent a year in a Kiev prison awaiting trial; found guilty of gross violation of safety regulations, sentenced to 10 years in a labor camp plus concurrent five years for abuse of power. Of this he served five. |
| Nikolai M. Fomin | | Chief engineer | Arrived at 4:30 am; spent a month in the Moscow clinic; after the disaster stripped of Communist party membership, arrested in August 1986, spent a year in a Kiev prison awaiting trial; cleared of charges of abuse of power, found guilty of gross violation of safety regulations, sentenced to 10 years in a labor camp, released soon afterwards because of a nervous breakdown. |
| Yakaterina A. Ivanenko | 26 May 1986 | Pripyat police guard | Guarded a gate opposite to block 4; stayed on duty until morning. |
| Klavdia I. Luzganova | 31 Jul 1986 | Pripyat police guard | Received a fatal dose (500 rad) guarding the spent fuel storage-building construction site, about 200 meters (660 ft) from block 4. |
| Ivan L. Orlov | 13 May 1986 | Chemical worker | Received a fatal dose (1450 rad) when the wind blew radioactive debris towards the Unit 5 staging area. |
| Petr Tolstiakov | | | Fishing at the shore of the cooling water channel when he witnessed the explosion. |

== Legacy ==
Two decades after the accident, the Chernobyl Forum Report showed that the first responders and clean-up workers, who were the people exposed to the highest level of radiations, still had the highest rates of depression and post-traumatic stress disorder.

== See also ==
- Deaths due to the Chernobyl disaster
- List of Chernobyl-related articles
