= Vasily Ignatenko =

Soviet firefighter (1961–1986)

Hero of Ukraine Vasily Ivanovich Ignatenko
- Ignatenko during his term of conscripted service as a military firefighter
- Born: 13 March 1961; Sperizh'e, Byelorussian SSR, Soviet Union
- Died: 13 May 1986 (aged 25); Moscow, Russian SFSR, Soviet Union
- Cause of death: Acute radiation syndrome
- Burial place: Mitinskoe Cemetery, Moscow, Russia
- Spouse: Lyudmilla Ignatenko (m. 1983)
- Children: Natasha Ignatenko (1986–1986)
- Military career
- Allegiance: Soviet Union
- Branch: MVD Internal Troops
- Service years: 1980–1982
- Rank: Senior Sergeant
- Unit: Paramilitary Fire Brigade No. 6 (Pripyat)
- Known for: First response to the 1986 Chernobyl disaster
- Awards: Order of the Red Banner (1986); Hero of Ukraine (2006); Order for Courage (2006)

Vasily Ivanovich Ignatenko (Ukrainian: Василь Іванович Ігнатенко; Belarusian: Васіль Іванавіч Ігнаценка; Russian: Василий Иванович Игнатенко; 13 March 1961 – 13 May 1986) was a Soviet firefighter who was among the first responders to the Chernobyl disaster.

He worked as an electrician before being conscripted into the Soviet Armed Forces in 1980, where he completed his two years of service as a military firefighter. Afterwards, he took up employment as a paramilitary firefighter with Fire Brigade No. 6, based in Pripyat. On 26 April 1986, Ignatenko's fire brigade was involved in mitigating the immediate aftermath of the Chernobyl disaster, fighting the fires that broke out following the initial explosion of Reactor 4 at the Chernobyl Nuclear Power Plant. While on site, Ignatenko received a high dose of radiation, leading to his death at a radiological hospital in Moscow eighteen days later.

== Early life ==
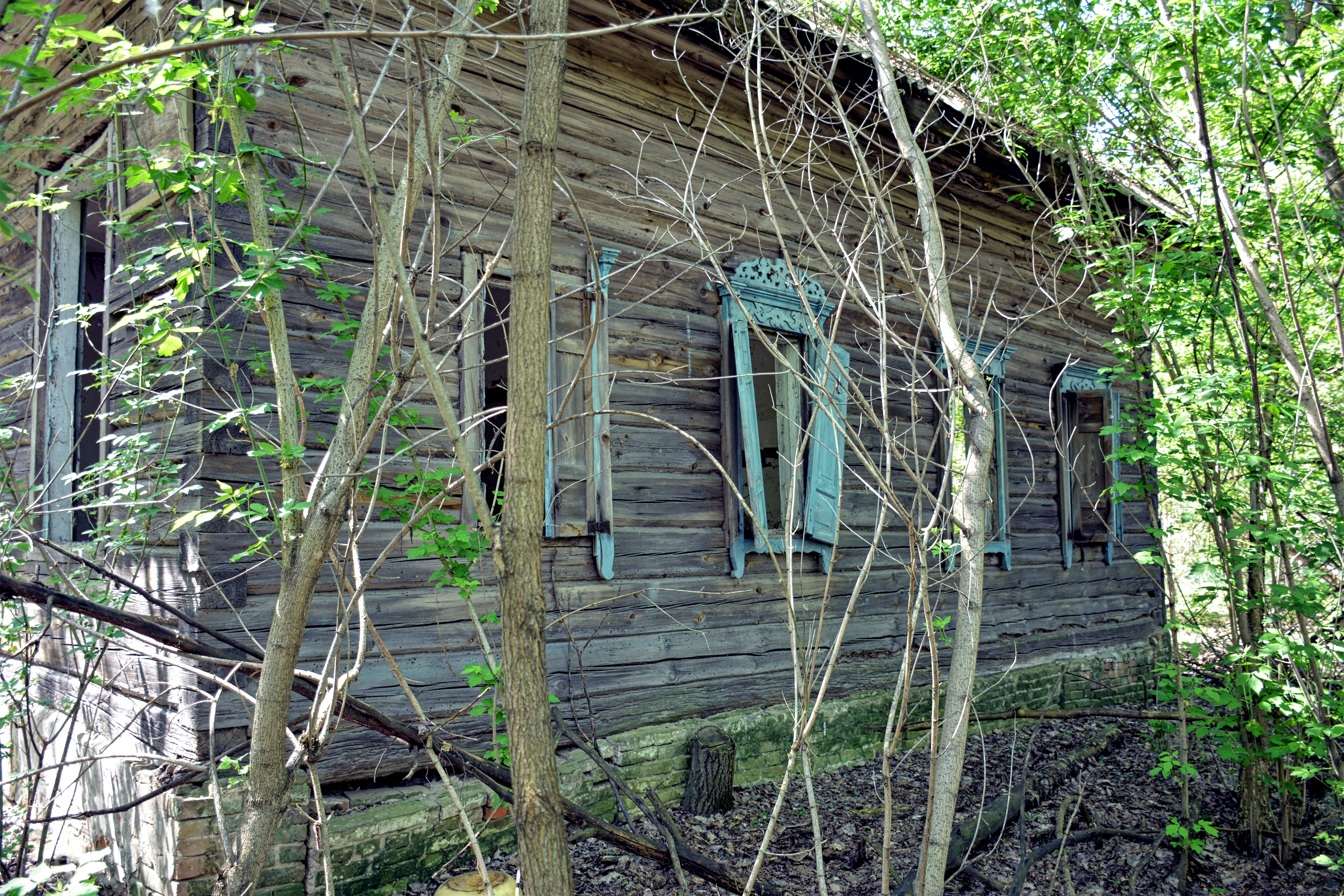
The School in Sperizh'e pictured in 2016.

Vasily Ivanovich Ignatenko was born on 13 March 1961, on a collective farm in the Brahin District of the Gomel Region of the Byelorussian SSR. He was the third child of Tatiana Petrovna Ignatenko and Ivan Tarasovich Ignatenko. Tatiana Ignatenko was a collective farm fieldworker, and Ivan Ignatenko a tractor, and later truck, driver. They had been married in 1958. Ignatenko had an older sister, Lyudmilla, a younger brother, Nikolai, and a younger sister, Natasha. Lyudmilla trained in medicine and worked as an ambulance paramedic, Nikolai became a bus and truck driver, and Natasha, after working in a state-run kindergarten for a time, would follow Ignatenko into the fire service. Ignatenko also had an older brother named Vitya, who had died from fever at age two or three, before Ignatenko was born. As a child, Vasily Ignatenko lived in the village of Sperizh'e with his family, helping with chores on the collective farm after school every day. He was especially fond of sports, spending Sundays playing football and other games.

== Firefighting career ==
After Ignatenko completed the requisite 10 classes of schooling, he enrolled in the Gomel vocational school of electrical engineering (PTU No. 81), studying to become an electrician. Following his graduation in 1978, he was assigned work at a mechanical fertilizer machine factory in Bobruisk. Ignatenko worked at the factory as an electrician for two years before he was called up into the Soviet Military.

=== Military service (1980–1982) ===
Ignatenko's firefighting career began during his time in military service. Following his call up in April 1980, he was assigned to the military fire department of Internal Troops of the Ministry of Internal Affairs (MVD), in Moscow. (The Moscow fire department, at this time, was staffed by conscripted military personnel.) It was here that he received his initial training in firefighting, and took the oath of service at the end of his training period. During his time in the Moscow fire department, Ignatenko became involved in fire-applied sports, contributing significantly to his fire brigade's success in competition.

=== Paramilitary Fire Brigade No. 6 (1982–1986) ===
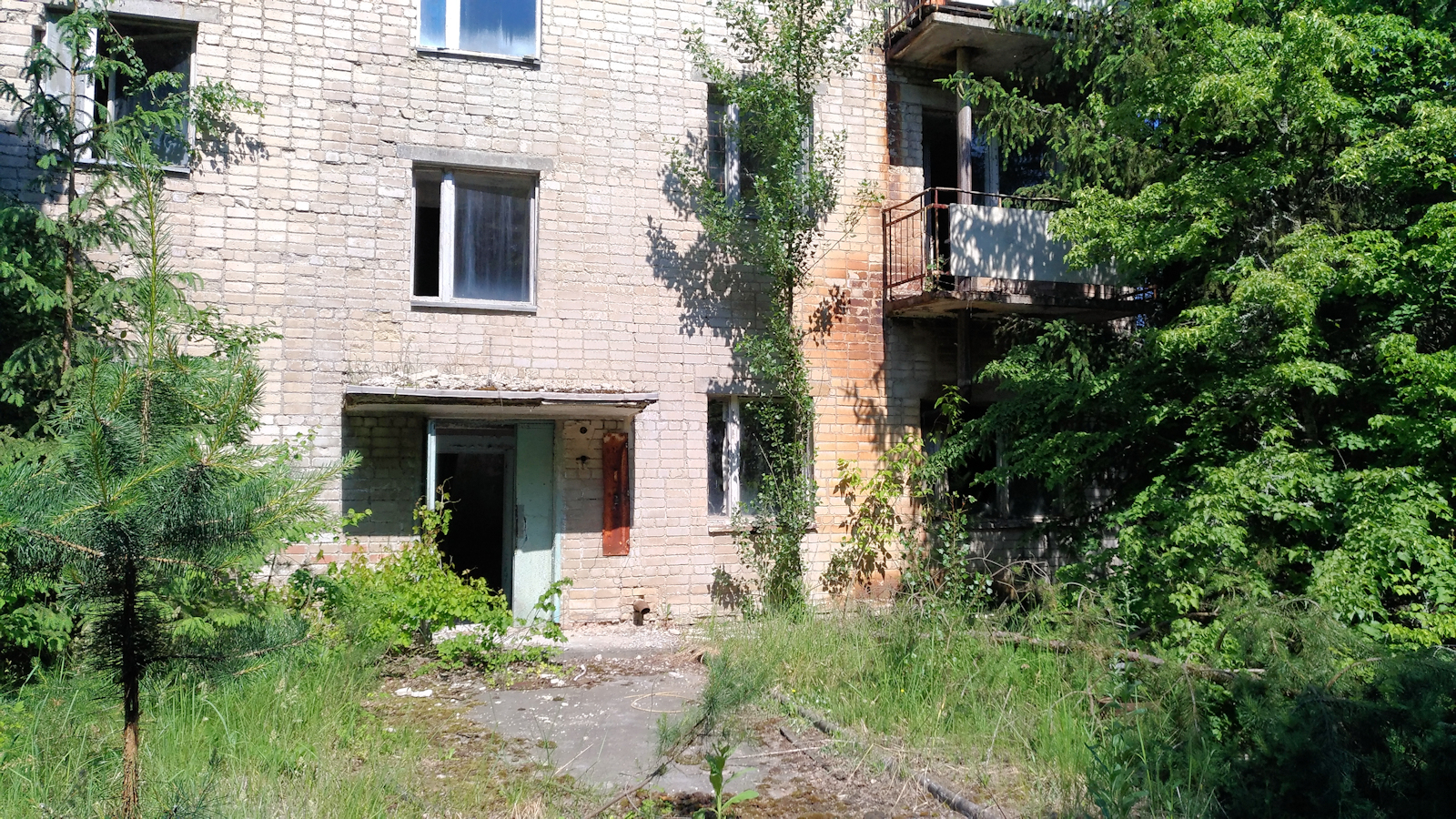
The fire station apartments in Pripyat where Ignatenko lived, as they appeared in 2019.

Ignatenko was discharged at the end of his two year obligatory service on 25 August 1982, and returned home to Sperizh'e. On his return, he immediately began to look for employment as a firefighter in nearby cities. His mother recalled: "After the army, he decided to go to the fire department. He went to Chernigov, and for some reason he was not taken there. Our neighbor worked at the nuclear power plant, and Vasya decided to try it too. From Chernigov he went straight there. He was hired immediately. Not even a month had passed since the army."

With his firefighting training and experience, Ignatenko was hired in the city of Pripyat, becoming an employee of the Paramilitary Fire Service, a uniformed, yet civilian-staffed, MVD firefighting organization. He soon moved into an apartment in the city fire station, beginning what would be a four-year term of service.

During his time with Paramilitary Fire Brigade No.6 (СВПЧ-6), he was promoted to Senior Sergeant, becoming a squad leader. He also continued to be active as an applied-fire sport athlete, becoming known as the brigade's champion.

== 1986 Chernobyl disaster ==
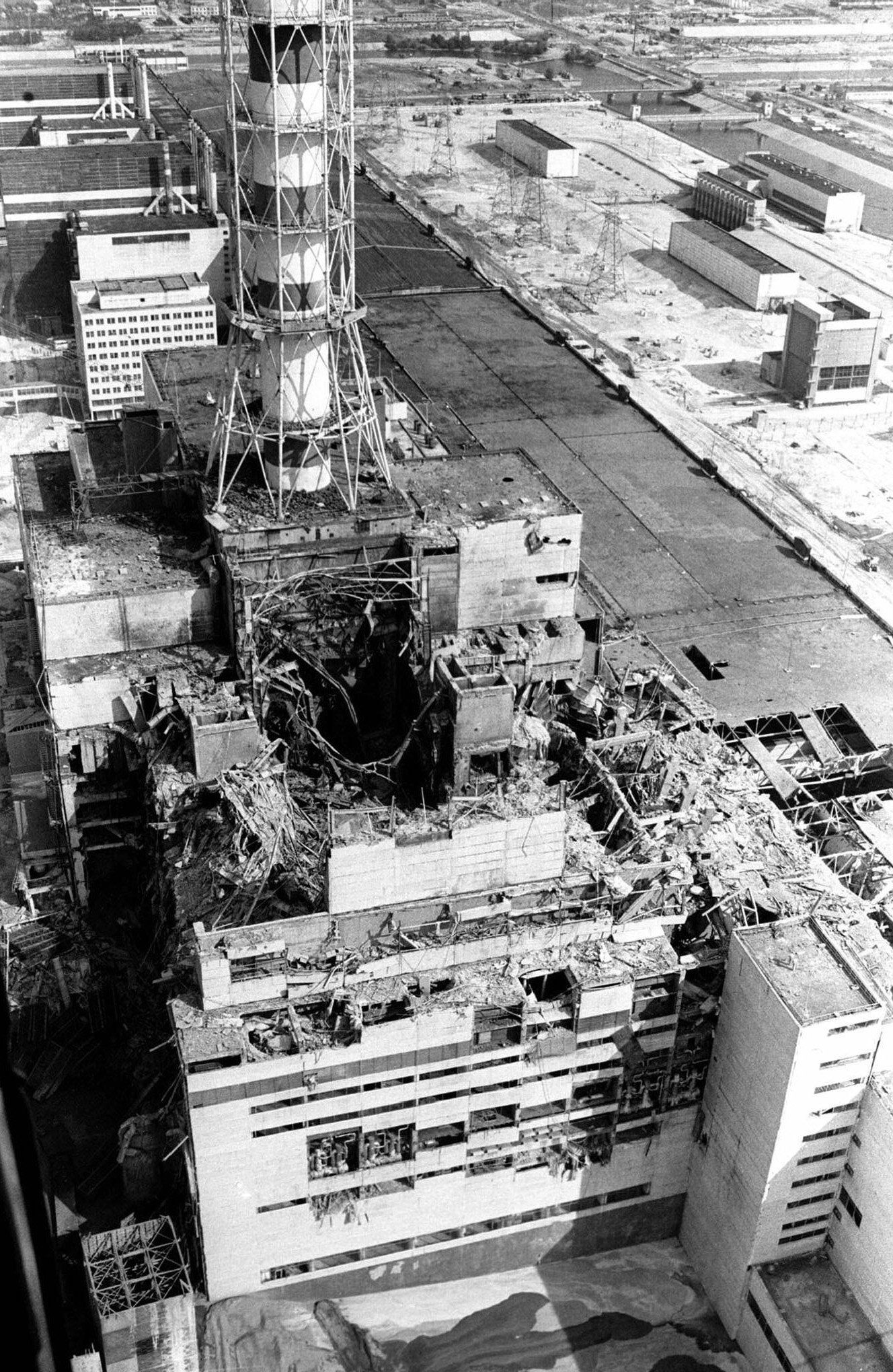
Ignatenko fought fires on the roofs of the ventilation block and reactor three, the part of the structure seen here around and behind the striped ventilation stack

On 26 April 1986, following the initial explosion at the Chernobyl Nuclear Power Plant, Paramilitary Fire Brigade No. 6 was quickly called to the scene, the call out coming at 1:29 a.m. As Ignatenko was on duty that night, he was among the first 9 duty-watch firefighters from Pripyat to depart for the power station, located a mere four kilometers (2.5 mi) away from the city.

On the scene, Ignatenko fought fires on the roof of the ventilation building and unit three (adjacent to the destroyed fourth reactor), where numerous small blazes had been started by super-heated pieces of graphite, zirconium, and other components flung from the RBMK reactor during the explosion. Using the unit three fire escape to reach the top of the 20-story structure, he, along with fellow firefighters Vladimir Tishura, Nikolai Titenok, and Nikolai Vashchuck were led by Lieutenants Viktor Kibenok and Volodymyr Pravyk in using water to extinguish these localized fires, while coordinating efforts to run firehoses up to the roof. This was necessary because the building's internal firefighting water-pipes had been fractured by the explosion and water pumped through them was lost before it could reach the roof.

The high level of radioactivity present on the roof, however, quickly began to take its toll. Ignatenko and the others were inhaling irradiated smoke, and working amid piles of ejected nuclear material, and soon began to experience the initial effects of acute radiation syndrome. Firefighters ordered by Major Leonid Telyatnikov to ascend the fire escape and assist met them halfway up as they struggled to descend, vomiting uncontrollably and unable to fully support themselves without one another's help. Helped to the ground by fellow firefighters, Ignatenko was evacuated to the Pripyat Hospital, around 2:35 a.m.

== Hospitalization and death ==
Ignatenko was initially hospitalized in Pripyat, but as the extent of the disaster began to be understood, all of the firefighters and plant personnel suffering from radiation exposure were evacuated by road to the Boryspil Airport near Kyiv, and from there to Moscow by air. He and the others were then transported to Hospital No. 6, a hospital operated by The Ministry of Medium Machine Building (the Soviet state nuclear energy agency) and the All-Union Physics Institute which had a specialized radiological department. There, in hopes of mitigating the effects of Acute Radiation Syndrome, Ignatenko was administered a bone marrow transplant on 2 May 1986, with his older sister as the donor. Ignatenko's younger sister Natasha had been identified as the preferable candidate and summoned to Moscow with her sister by telegram on April 28, but as she was then only thirteen years of age, Ignatenko rejected her out of concern for her health. It was hoped the procedure would raise his white blood cell count, which had been lowered sharply by radiation exposure, leaving him extremely vulnerable to infection.

Though Ignatenko recovered from the operation, the transplant was unsuccessful in producing the desired result and his condition continued to worsen. He experienced hair loss and skin necrosis as his digestive and respiratory systems continued to degrade. By May 4, he was unable to stand. Infection brought on by damage to his immune system eventually led to organ failure. Vasily Ignatenko died at 11:20 in the morning on 13 May 1986.

Ignatenko's funeral was held two days later on 15 May, attended by his family and the families of other injured and deceased firefighters. Ignatenko was interred in two coffins, an inner one made of zinc, and an outer of wood. He was buried with full military honours alongside other Chernobyl victims in Mitinskoe Cemetery, Moscow.

== Personal life ==
Vasily Ignatenko remained very close to his family throughout his life, regularly taking the train from Pripyat to visit them on weekends. He helped around the house and with garden chores during these visits, even making furniture. After the accident, his family's village was contaminated, forcing them to resettle elsewhere. Their house, which the family had built in 1981, burned down soon after its abandonment.

From 1983, Ignatenko was married to Lyudmilla Ignatenko (born 1963; not to be confused with Ignatenko's sister of the same name). She was from central Ukraine, and worked at the confectionery shop of a factory-kitchen enterprise in Pripyat. Meeting through mutual friends at an apartment party in Pripyat, they courted and were legally married on 24 September 1983. Two separate celebrations were held for the families of both the bride and groom in their respective hometowns following a civil ceremony.

After the disaster, Lyudmilla traveled to Moscow with Ignatenko's father. There, she remained at the hospital through her husband's illness, helping to care for him through his decline in health up until his death. It was she who summoned the family to Moscow by telephone as Ignatenko entered terminal decline.

Vasily and Lyudmilla Ignatenko had one child following a previous unsuccessful pregnancy: Natasha Ignatenko. Reportedly born with congenital heart defects and cirrhosis of the liver, she died shortly after she was born and was buried with her father in Mitinskoe Cemetery, Moscow.

As Lyudmilla was pregnant with her daughter at the time of the accident and during her husband's hospitalization, it has been speculated that her daughter's death was the result of radiation exposure from her husband. In a 1996 interview, Lyudmilla said that her baby "took the whole radioactive shock [...] She was like a lightning rod for it". However Ukrainian medical responder Alla Shapiro, in a 2019 interview with Vanity Fair, said such beliefs were false, and that once Ignatenko was showered and out of his contaminated clothing, he would not have been dangerous to others, precluding this possibility. Robert Peter Gale, an American hematologist who was directly involved in the treatment of Chernobyl radiation patients, also writes that victims were not radioactive themselves and therefore did not pose a danger of radiation exposure to others, although this was unknown at the time of the disaster.

== Legacy ==
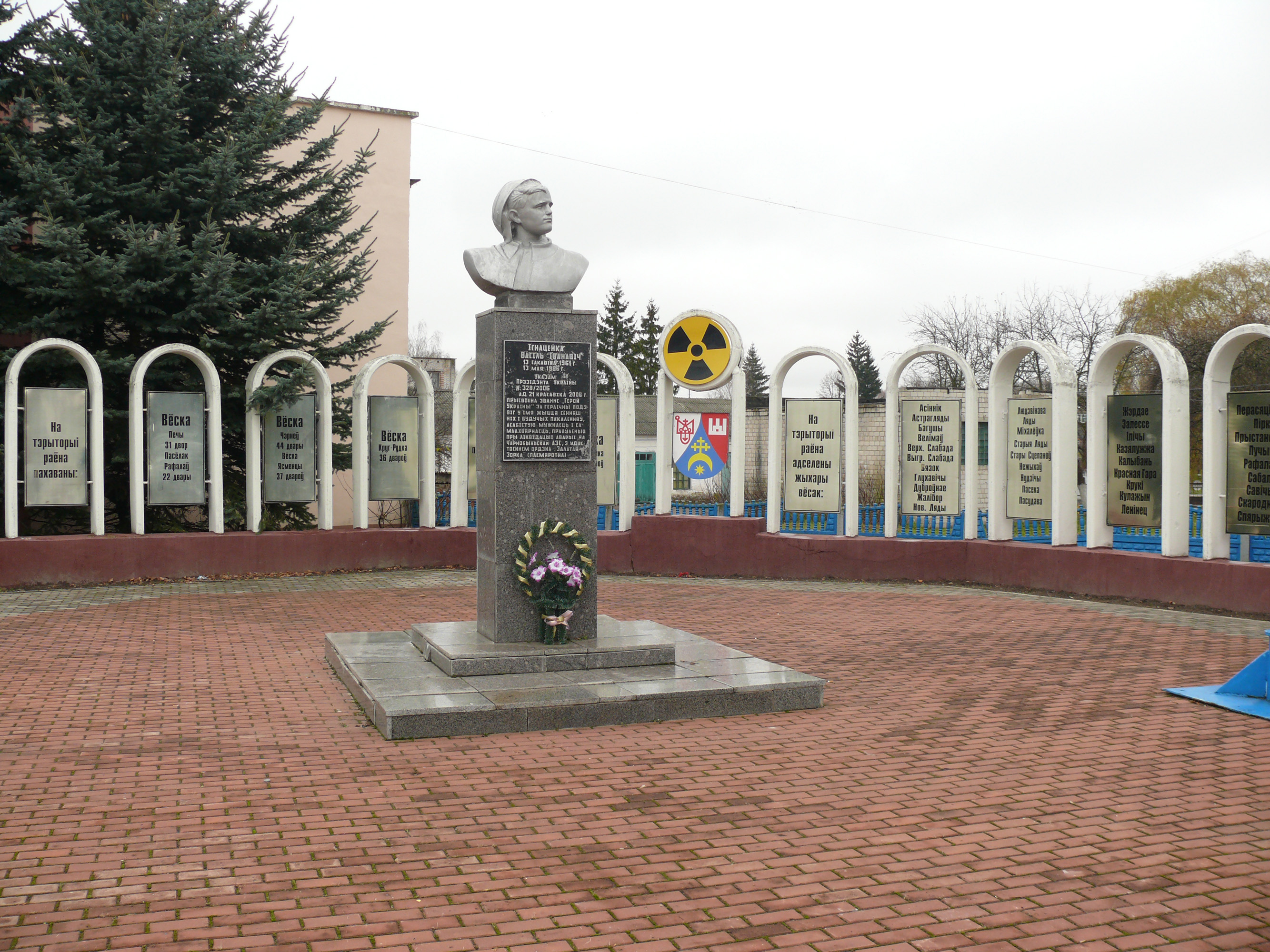
Monument to Ignatenko in Brahin, Belarus

Vasily Ignatenko was awarded the Soviet Order of the Red Banner posthumously in 1986. In 2006, he was posthumously awarded the title of the Hero of Ukraine, the highest national award in the country, along with the Ukrainian Order for Courage. Several monuments have been erected in his honor, including in Berezino and his home district of Brahin, where a museum exhibit has also been dedicated to him. There are streets named in his honor in Minsk and Berezino.

=== Posthumous honours ===
Hero of Ukraine (2006)
Ukraine's Order for Courage
Order of the Red Banner

=== In popular culture ===
Ignatenko's wife, Lyudmilla Ignatenko, provided an account reflecting on her husband's death to Belarusian author Svetlana Alexievich for her 1997 book Voices From Chernobyl. This story was adapted for use in streaming service HBO's 2019 miniseries Chernobyl (where Ignatenko and his wife were portrayed by Adam Nagaitis and Jessie Buckley respectively) and the subject of Ljudmilas Röst, a 2001 documentary film by Gunnar Bergdahl.

== See also ==
- Individual involvement in the Chernobyl disaster

== General sources ==
- Alexievich, Svetlana (2005). Voices from Chernobyl: The Oral History of a Nuclear Disaster. Translated by Gessen, Keith. Normal, Illinois: Dalkey Archive Press. ISBN 1-56478-401-0. OL 17152904M.
- Benitsevich, Natalia; Brushko, Dimitri. ""Плакать на кладбище запрещали". Во имя чего умер ликвидатор, который тушил пожар на ЧАЭС" (in Russian). TUT.BY News. Archived from the original on 12 May 2019.
- Zlydenko, Nina (26 April 2016). "Мать героя Чернобыля рассказала о сыне" (in Russian). Gomel Pravda.
- "Игнатенко Василий Иванович" (in Russian). Fireman.club. 4 December 2016.
- Denisova, Alexandra (5 June 2019). "'Гибель мужа мне предсказала гадалка', — интервью с вдовой ликвидатора аварии на ЧАЭС Василия Игнатенко". ФАКТЫ. Archived from the original on 10 April 2021.
- Melinichuk, Tatiana (5 June 2019). "Герой "Чернобыля": мать пожарного Василия Игнатенко о том, каким он был в жизни" (in Russian). BBC News. BBC Russian Service.
- "Ignatenko, Vasily Ivanovich". Book of Memory, participants in the liquidation of the Chernobyl accident. (in Ukrainian). Kiev, Ukraine: National Chornobyl Museum.
- Yushchenko, Viktor (21 April 2006). "On the Title of Hero of Ukraine" (in Ukrainian). Kyiv: Verkhovna Rada of Ukraine. Document 328/2006.
- Gale, Robert Peter (24 May 2019). "Chernobyl, the HBO miniseries: Fact and fiction (Part II)". The Cancer Letter.
- "Chernobyl Doctor Fact Checks the HBO Series". Vanity Fair. 19 September 2019. Event occurs at 08'22".
- "Василий Иванович Игнатенко". Vulica (in Russian).
- Higgenbotham, Adam (2019). Midnight in Chernobyl. New York, NY: Simon and Schuster. ISBN 978-1-5011-3461-6.
- Karplan, Nikolai (2012). From Chernobyl to Fukushima. Kyiv: S. Podgornov. pp. 14–18. ISBN 978-966-7853-00-6.
