= Viktor Kibenok =

Chernobyl firefighter, Hero of the Soviet Union

- Виктор Николаевич Кибенок
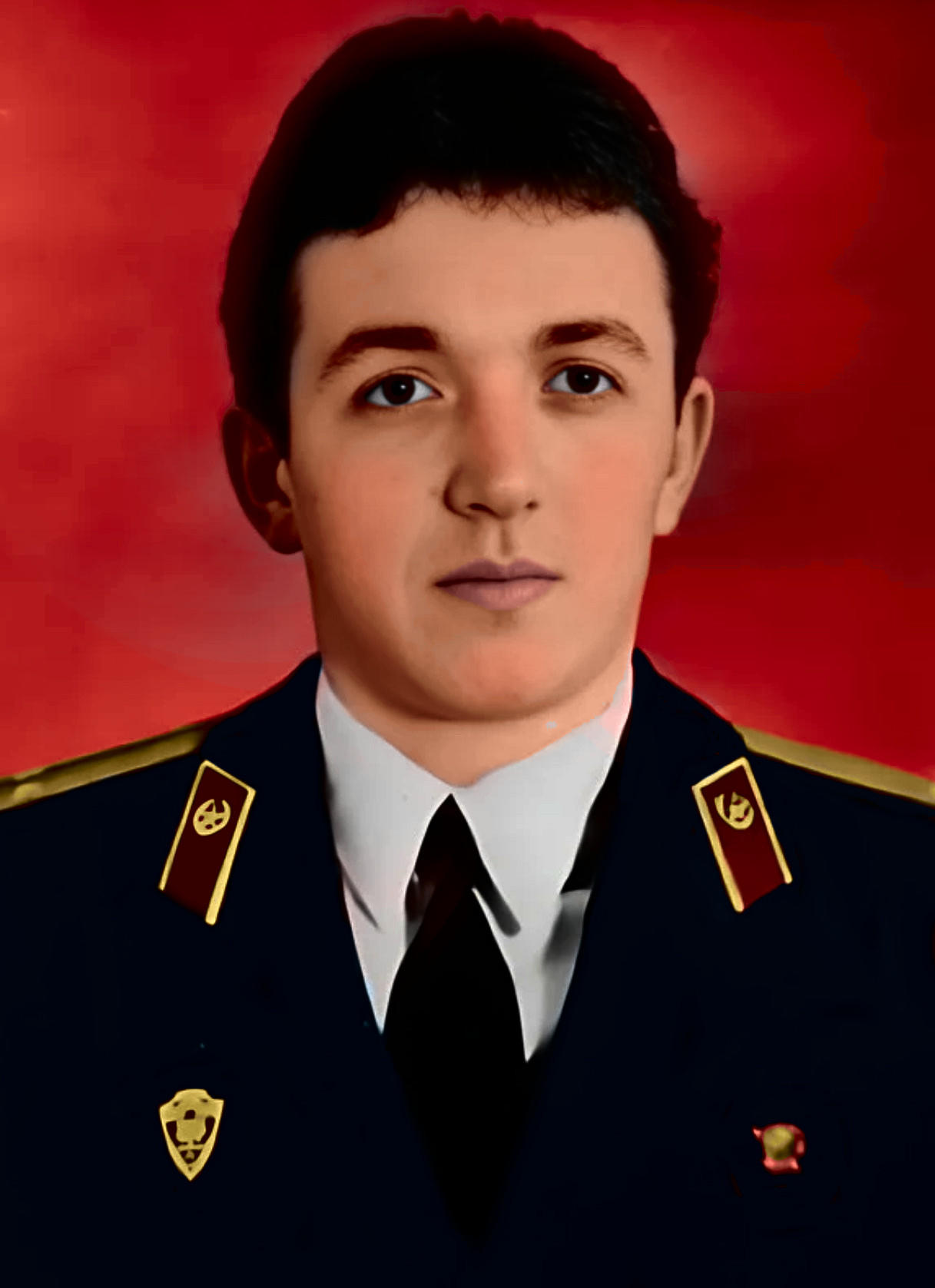
- Kibenok in 1984
- Born: 17 February 1963; Ivanivka, Ukrainian SSR (now Ukraine), Soviet Union
- Died: 11 May 1986 (aged 23); Moscow, RSFSR, Soviet Union
- Cause of death: Acute radiation syndrome
- Burial place: Mitinskoe Cemetery
- Spouse: Tatyana Kibenok
- Military career
- Allegiance: Soviet Union
- Branch: Internal Troops of the Ministry for Internal Affairs
- Service years: 1984–1986
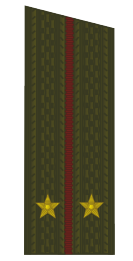
- Rank: Lieutenant
- Unit: Paramilitary Fire Department No.6
- Conflicts: Chernobyl Disaster
- Awards: Hero of the Soviet Union; Order of Lenin; Order for Courage

Viktor Nikolaevich Kibenok (Ukrainian: Віктор Миколайович Кібенок, Russian: Виктор Николаевич Кибенок; 17 February 1963 – 11 May 1986) was a Chernobyl firefighter who was posthumously awarded the title Hero of the Soviet Union after he died of acute radiation syndrome.

== Early life ==
Viktor Kibenok was born on 17 February 1963 in the village of Ivanivka, Kherson Oblast in the Ukrainian Soviet Socialist Republic. Kibenok's father, Nikolai Kibenok, was also a firefighter who was awarded the Medal "For Courage in a Fire".

== Firefighting career ==
Kibenok completed his preliminary high school education in 1980 before working as a paramilitary fireman for the Militarized Fire Department No.2 (Russian: Военизированная пожарная часть № 2/ ВПЧ-2) in Chernobyl from 1980 to 1981. Kibenok eventually studied as a cadet at the Voroshilov School for Junior Leadership Training before enrolling at the Cherkasy Fire Safety Institute for the Ministry of Internal Affairs in Cherkasy. Kibenok graduated from the Cherkasy Fire Safety Institute in August 1984 with the rank of Lieutenant. Kibenok was eventually assigned to the 6th Paramilitary Fire Department (CВПЧ-6) in Pripyat in 1984 where he was the head of the fire brigade.

== Chernobyl disaster ==
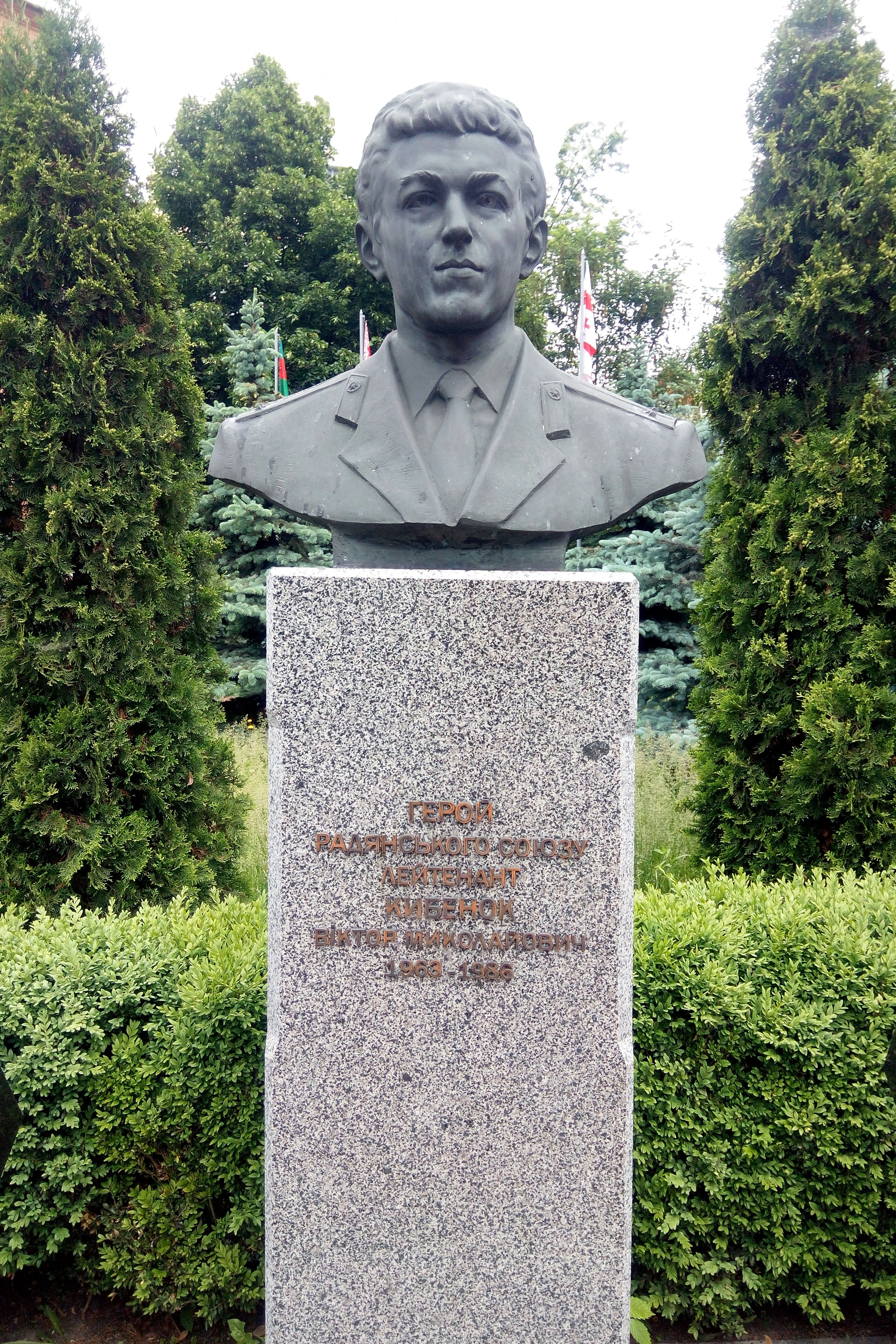
Bust of Kibenok in Kyiv

Kibenok was part of the 28-man team which responded to the alarm at 01:29 in the morning on 26 April 1986 at the beginning of the Chernobyl disaster shortly after the initial explosion. Among the team was Volodymyr Pravyk, Vasily Ignatenko, Nikolai Vashchuk , Vladimir Tishura, Nikolai Titenok, and Leonid Telyatnikov, among others. While extinguishing the fires on and around the roof of the Chernobyl Nuclear Power Plant's reactor hall Kibenok and others received lethal doses of radiation and began to exhibit signs of acute radiation syndrome.

== Hospitalization and death ==
Kibenok stayed in Sanitary Unit No.126 (the Pripyat Hospital) for one day before the true scale of the accident was realized. He was then transported by air to Moscow Hospital No.6, which specialised in treating victims of radiation accidents. Kibenok had received bitumen burns on the inside of his mouth and his lungs were damaged by inhaling burning bitumen. Due to these internal burns, Kibenok couldn't eat and it was extremely painful for him to speak. By 9 May 1986 Kibenok could no longer stand. Kibenok died a few days later on 11 May 1986 a few hours after his friend and colleague Vladimir Pravik. Kibenok's funeral was held on 13 May 1986. Kibenok received an estimated 1000 REM (10 Sv) dose. Kibenok was aged just 23. He is buried alongside his comrades in Mitinskoe Cemetery in Moscow.

== Legacy ==
After his death, Kibenok left behind a wife and unborn child, although the child would later be stillborn. Kibenok was posthumously awarded the Hero of The Soviet Union award along with the Order of Lenin on 25 September 1986. Kibenok has a street named after him in his home city of Ivanivka. Kibenok also has numerous monuments, all over the Kyiv region, including one at the Cherkasy Fire and Technical School where Kibenok trained to become an officer.

== See also ==
- Deaths due to the Chernobyl disaster
- Individual involvement in the Chernobyl disaster
