= Nikolai Vashchuk =

Russian-Ukrainian firefighter (1959–1986)

Nikolai Vasilyevich Vashchuk
- Russian: Николай Васильевич Ващук; Ukrainian: Микола Васильович Ващук
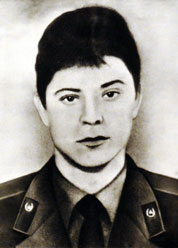
- Born: June 5, 1959; Velika Khaicha, Zhytomyr Oblast, Ukrainian SSR, USSR
- Died: May 14, 1986 (aged 26); Moscow, USSR
- Known for: Chernobyl disaster cleanup

Nikolai Vasilyevich Vashchuk (Russian: Николай Васильевич Ващук) (Ukrainian: Микола Васильович Ващук; 5 June 1959, Velika Khaicha, Zhytomyr Oblast — 14 May 1986, Moscow) — was a liquidator for cleaning up the Chernobyl disaster, commander of the sixth independent militarized fire department for the protection of the city of Pripyat, and Hero of Ukraine (2006, posthumously).

== Biography ==
Vashchuk died of acute radiation sickness in the 6th Clinical Hospital (Moscow) on May 14, 1986. He is buried at Mitinskoe Cemetery in Moscow.

== Awards ==
- The title of Hero of Ukraine with the award of the Order of the Gold Star (April 21, 2006) - for heroic deeds in the name of the lives of present and future generations, personal courage and self-sacrifice demonstrated during the liquidation of the accident at the Chernobyl nuclear power plant (posthumously).
- The insignia of the President of Ukraine - the cross "for courage"Cross "For Courage" (May 8, 1996) - for personal courage and bravery demonstrated during the liquidation of the accident at the Chernobyl nuclear power plant (posthumously)
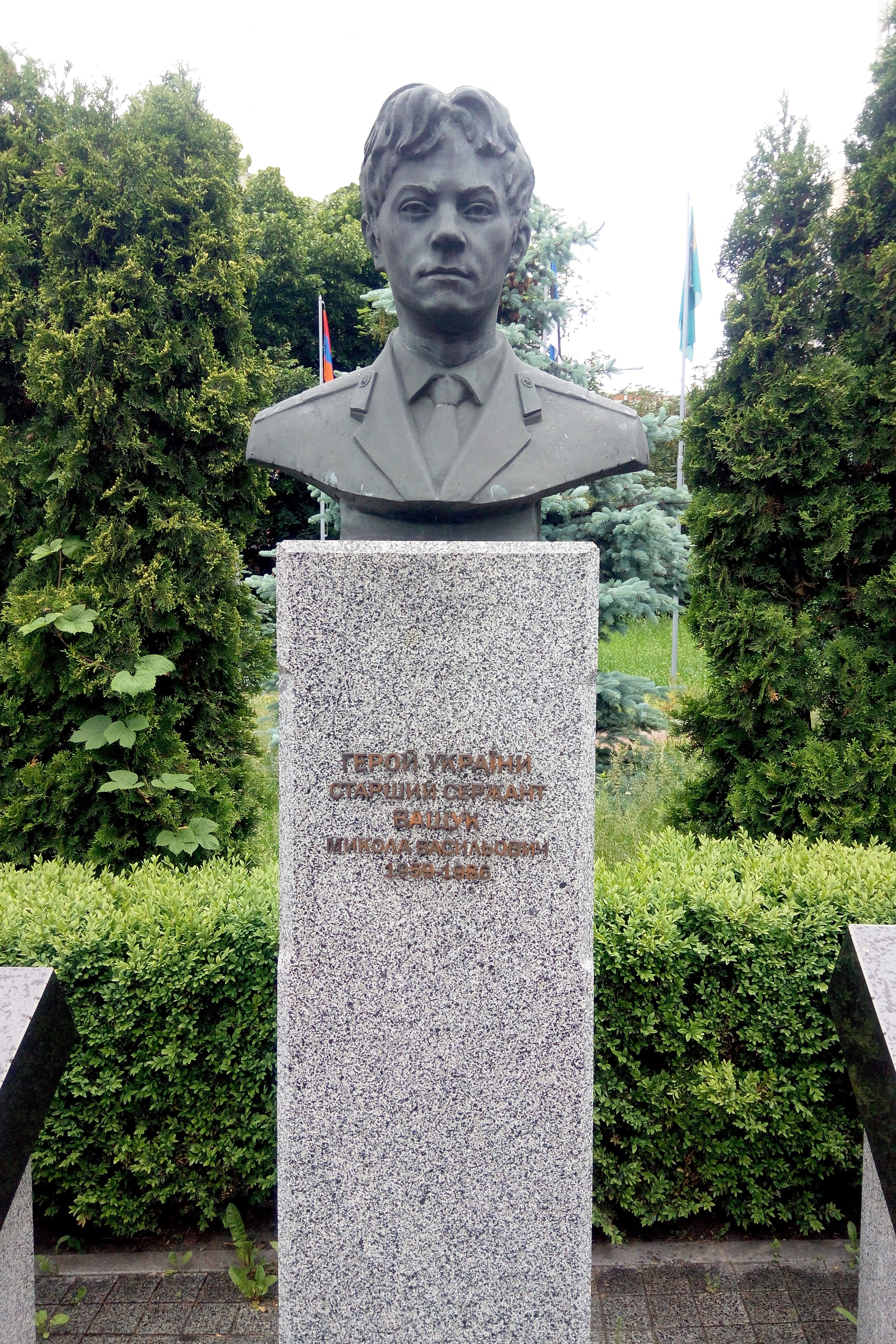
  A bust of Nikolai Vashchuk on the Alley of Heroes of Chernobyl in Kyiv
- Posthumously awarded the order of the Red Banner.
