= Proskuryakov =

Proskuryakov, feminine: Proskuryakova or alternative spelling Proskouriakov and Proskouriakoff is a surname. It may refer to:

- Ilya Proskuryakov (born 1987), Russian ice hockey player and goaltender
- Viktor Proskuryakov, a trainee present to watch Toptunov during Chernobyl disaster. See Individual involvement in the Chernobyl disaster#Aleksandr Kudryavtsev and Viktor Proskuryakov
- Elena Proskurakova (born 1985), Kyrgyz judoka
- Lavr Proskuryakov (1858–1926), Russo-Soviet engineer and structural mechanic
- Tatiana Proskouriakoff (1909–1985), Russian-American Mayanist scholar and archaeologist
- Tatyana Rodionova (long jumper) née Proskuryakova, Russian long jumper
- Yuliya Proskuryakova (born 1982), Russian pop singer and actress
