= Leonid Toptunov =

Soviet senior nuclear engineer (1960–1986)

- Леонід Топтунов
- Born: Leonid Fedorovych Toptunov; 16 August 1960; Mykolaivka, Buryn Raion, Sumy Oblast, Ukrainian SSR, Soviet Union
- Died: 14 May 1986 (aged 25); Moscow, Soviet Union
- Cause of death: Acute radiation syndrome
- Education: Obninsk Institute for Nuclear Power Engineering
- Honors: 3rd Class Order for Courage (2008)
- Engineering career
- Discipline: Nuclear engineering
- Employer: Chernobyl Nuclear Power Plant (1983–1986)

Leonid Fedorovych Toptunov (Ukrainian: Леонід Федорович Топтунов, Russian: Леонид Фёдорович Топтунов; 16 August 1960 – 14 May 1986) was a Soviet nuclear engineer who was the senior reactor control chief engineer at the Chernobyl Nuclear Power Plant Reactor Unit 4 on the night of the Chernobyl disaster, 26 April 1986.

== Early life ==
Leonid Toptunov was born on 16 August 1960 in Mykolaivka, Buryn Raion, Sumy Oblast, Ukraine. His father was involved in the Soviet space program and during his childhood, he was surrounded by scientists and engineers.

In 1983, he graduated from the Obninsk Institute for Nuclear Power Engineering with a specialist degree in nuclear power plant engineering.

== Chernobyl ==
In March 1983, Toptunov began his career at the Chernobyl Nuclear Power Plant. During his studies of the reactor documentation, he mentioned to his friend, Sasha Korol, that control rods may, in certain circumstances, accelerate rather than slow the reaction. He worked as a unit control engineer and senior reactor control engineer. While working in Chernobyl, Toptunov befriended Aleksandr Akimov; the two would become good friends who would engage in recreational activities together. Toptunov always desired an older brother, and Akimov provided just that.

On the night of 26 April 1986, Toptunov worked in the control room at the reactor control panel with Akimov. Toptunov only had two months' experience in operating the reactor, and this was his first shutdown as operator. The operators attempted to perform a rundown test before scheduled routine maintenance. In preparation, Anatoly Dyatlov ordered the power to be reduced to 700 MW, as the test plan stipulated. Toptunov, deviating from the test program, lowered power beyond 700 MW to mitigate a possible pressure wave in the drum separators. However, the reactor stalled unexpectedly during test preparations, dropping to a low 30 MW, due to a failure in the automatic regulators. Some theories have suggested that xenon poisoning was the cause of this power drop, however it has been determined that xenon alone could not have caused such a rapid power drop. Raising power after this point put the reactor into a potentially dangerous state due to design flaws in the reactor unknown to the operators. Toptunov didn't want to raise control rods, aware of his own inexperience, so he got Yuri Tregub to assist him ordered by Dyatlov. Toptunov began raising control rods to try and raise power to a level that the test could be conducted at. Due to the operators being unaware of the level of control rod insertion thanks to several factors, the operators raised a dangerous number of control rods in order to reach a power level of 200 MW, which was deemed not only safe for the test, but a better option than conducting the test at the stipulated 700 MW. During the test, Akimov called for the AZ-5 (scram) button to be pressed to shut down the reactor after a sudden power surge, and Toptunov operated the button. Due to a design flaw of the RBMK reactor, the descending control rods momentarily accelerated the nuclear reaction and caused the reactor to explode.

Toptunov, along with non-essential personnel, was dismissed. He left the control room, but decided to return out of a sense of responsibility. He worked with Akimov, Nekhaev, Uskov and Orlov to manually open water valves in an attempt to increase water supply to the reactor, during which time they began to experience symptoms of acute radiation syndrome. They were found by other workers and taken to the infirmary. During the accident, he was exposed to a lethal radiation dose of 1300 rem.

He was initially admitted to Pripyat Hospital, but quickly transferred to Moscow Hospital 6. By 28 April, the symptoms of radiation sickness had mostly subsided. His parents visited him in the hospital; although he could walk, his parents could see he had severe skin damage. During his stay, he discussed possible causes of the accident with Akimov and Dyatlov, but they were mystified. Toptunov received a bone marrow transplant in an attempt to restore his immune system, while Akimov did not get a transplant as it would have seemed insufficient due to the severity of his ARS. Toptunov died from acute radiation poisoning on 14 May 1986 and was laid to rest at the Mitinskoe Cemetery in Moscow. His family was informed that his death was the only reason he was not prosecuted for the accident.

While the initial Soviet investigation put almost all the blame on the operators and management, later findings by the IAEA found that the reactor design and how the operators were informed of safety information were more significant. However, the operators were found to have deviated from operational procedures, changing test protocols on the fly, and having made "ill judged" actions, making human factors a major contributing factor.

== Recognition ==
In 2008, Toptunov was posthumously awarded with the 3rd degree Order For Courage by Viktor Yushchenko, the then-President of Ukraine.

He was portrayed by actor Volodya Stepanenko in the 2004 Zero Hour TV series. He was portrayed by Michael Colgan in the 2006 BBC production Surviving Disaster: Chernobyl Nuclear Disaster and by Robert Emms in the 2019 HBO miniseries Chernobyl.

== See also ==
- Deaths due to the Chernobyl disaster
