= Valery Khodemchuk =

Chernobyl disaster victim (1951–1986)

- Валерій Ходемчук
- Born: 24 March 1951; Kropyvnia, Ukrainian SSR, Soviet Union
- Died: 26 April 1986 (aged 35); Pripyat, Ukrainian SSR, Soviet Union
- Cause of death: Collapsed floor during the explosion at reactor hall
- Burial place: Chernobyl Nuclear Power Plant
- Occupation: Pump operator
- Known for: First victim of Chernobyl disaster
- Spouse: Nataliia Khodemchuk
- Children: 2
- Awards: Order of the Badge of Honour; Order For Courage Third Class

Valery Ilyich Khodemchuk (Ukrainian: Валерій Ілліч Ходемчук; Russian: Валерий Ильич Ходемчук; 24 March 1951 – 26 April 1986) was a Soviet engineer who was the night shift circulating pump operator at the Chernobyl power plant, and the first casualty of the Chernobyl disaster.

== Biography ==
Valery Khodemchuk was born 24 March 1951 in Kropyvnia, Ivankiv Raion, Kyiv Oblast.

He began his career at the Chernobyl Nuclear Power Plant in September 1973. During his first years at Chernobyl, he held the positions of the engineer of boilers, the senior engineer of boilers of the workshop of thermal and underground communications, the operator of the 6th group and the senior operator of the 7th group of the main circulation pump of the 4th unit of the reactor workshop.

On the night of 26 April 1986, Khodemchuk was in the northern main circulation pump hall. Shortly before his death, Khodemchuk placed a phone call to another pump operator, Aleksandr Odintsov, and said "I need to recharge the lower feed for [pump number] 22… Okay, come on. So it's shortened, one sec…"

Then, just seconds later, at approximately 1:23:48 a.m. (Moscow Time), two powerful explosions tore through Unit 4, including the main circulation pump halls. Valery Khodemchuk was the first person to die in the Chernobyl disaster; it is thought he was vaporized instantly by the blast or crushed by large chunks of falling debris.

His body was never found, and it is presumed that he is entombed under the remnants of the circulation pumps. A monument to Khodemchuk was built into the side of the Sarcophagus' interior dividing wall, east of the pump hall where he died. In 1998, a cenotaph honoring him was placed at Mitinskoe Cemetery in Moscow, the final resting place of firefighters and power plant workers who died putting out the fires from the Chernobyl disaster.

== Family ==
Khodemchuk was married to Nataliia Khodemchuk.

During the Russo-Ukrainian war, Nataliia was seriously injured on 14 November 2025, when Russian "Shahed" drones bombed Kyiv and one of them struck her home. She died in the hospital the following day from the injuries she sustained.

== Recognition ==
In 2008, Khodemchuk was posthumously awarded with the 3rd degree Order For Courage by Viktor Yushchenko, the President of Ukraine.

Actor Kieran O'Brien portrayed him in the 2019 HBO miniseries Chernobyl.

== See also ==
- Deaths due to the Chernobyl disaster
