= Leonid Telyatnikov =

Ukrainian firefighter at Chernobyl (1951-2004)

- Леонід Петрович Телятников
- Born: 25 January 1951; Vvedenka, Kostanay Region, Kazakh SSR, Soviet Union (now Kazakhstan)
- Died: 2 December 2004 (aged 53); Kyiv, Ukraine
- Burial place: Baikove Cemetery, Kyiv
- Spouse: Larisa Ivanova Telyatnikov
- Children: Oleg Telyatnikov, Mikhail Telyatnikov
- Military career
- Allegiance: Soviet Union→Ukraine
- Branch: Paramilitary Fire Service of the Ministry of Internal Affairs of the USSR; Ukrainian Interior Ministry State Fire Service
- Service years: 1968–1995
- Rank: Major; Lieutenant Colonel; Major General
- Commands: Head, Kustanai Paramilitary Fire Department (1978–1980); Deputy Head, Paramilitary Fire Brigade No.69, Kustanai (1980–1982); Senior Engineer Group of the Protected Objects Division of the Kiev-Svyatoshinsky District Fire Safety Department, Kiev Executive Committee (1982–1983); Head, Paramilitary Fire Brigade No.2, Chernobyl Nuclear Power Plant (1983–1986); Head, Kiev Fire Test Laboratory (1986–1989); Head, Regulatory and Fire Safety Department of the Kiev Police Department and Executive Committee (1989–1993); Deputy chief (1993–1995), Head (1995) State Fire Service of the Ukrainian Ministry of Internal Affairs; Head, Kyiv Volunteer Fire Company (1998)
- Awards: Hero of the Soviet Union (1986); Order of Lenin (1986); Ukrainian Order for Courage, 3rd degree (1996) [British fire union medal] [Other Soviet Medals]
- Other work: Founder of Kiev "Young Firefighters" organization.

Leonid Petrovych Telyatnikov (Ukrainian: Леонід Петрович Телятніков; 25 January 1951 – 2 December 2004) was a Soviet, and later Ukrainian, fire brigade commander notable for his role in directing the early stages initial response to the Chernobyl disaster. Telyatnikov served many years as an officer in both Soviet and Ukrainian firefighting organizations, working in a variety of junior and senior leadership positions throughout his career.

== Early life ==
Leonid Petrovych Telyatnikov was born on January 25, 1951, in the village of Vvedenka, located in the Kustanay Rayon of the Kazakh SSR of the Soviet Union. (Now the Kostanay Rayon of Kazakhstan.) He completed his primary schooling there. Following his graduation, he worked for a time as an electrician at the Kustanay Auto Repair Plant before beginning his fire fighting career in 1968.

== Early firefighting career (1968–1986) ==
=== In the Kazakh SSR ===
Telyatnikov enrolled as a cadet in the Sverdlovsk Fire-Technical Academy in 1968. Having completed the three-year program, he graduated in 1971, becoming a part of the Paramilitary Fire Department of the Ministry of Internal Affairs of the USSR (MVD). After his graduation, he became a fire safety inspector in the Kustanay Rayon, serving in this capacity for two years. In 1973, he was reassigned to the MVD of the Rudny Executive Committee, serving as a fire inspector in the city for a year. In 1974, Telyatnikov enrolled in the Higher Engineering and Fire-Technical Academy of the MVD in Moscow. Finishing the four-year term of study, Telyatnikov graduated in 1978. Telyatnikov then returned to Kustanay and became the head of the Paramilitary Fire Department of the MVD of the Kustanai City Executive Committee, a position he held from 1978 to 1980. From 1980 to 1982, Telyatnikov was the deputy head of Paramilitary Fire Brigade No.69 in Kustanay.

=== In the Ukrainian SSR ===
In 1982, Telyatnikov moved from Kustanai to Kiev. In his first year there, he served as senior engineer of the group for supervision of special objects of the Fire Safety Department of the ROVD of the Kiev-Svyatoshinsky District Executive Committee of the city of Kiev. In 1983, he was given command of Paramilitary Fire Brigade No.2, the fire brigade tasked with the protection of the Chernobyl Nuclear Power Plant, moving his family to the nearby city of Pripyat.

== Chernobyl disaster ==
At the time of the Chernobyl disaster, Telyatnikov, now a Major in the MVD, was vacationing with his wife and children at their dacha outside of Pripyat. He and his wife were awake, waiting for the cold water to come on the tap, when several explosions were heard. Unalarmed, they believed that they had heard the sound of supersonic aircraft passing low overhead, which was a common occurrence in the area. Soon after, at around 01:32 or 01:33 in the morning, Telyatnikov was telephoned by the fire dispatcher, informing him of the accident and summoning him to the power station. Telyatnikov quickly put on his uniform and telephoned the Pripyat Militsiya Station, asking the duty officer there to send a car to take him to the station, which was four or five kilometers from his dacha.

Arriving at the station around 1:45 in the morning, Telyatnikov found that the response to the fire had already begun. As commander of Paramilitary Fire Brigade No.2, charged with the fire protection of the station, he assumed command of the fire-fighting efforts. One of his first actions was to order a visual survey of the building to determine the locations of the many fires:

"We surveyed the Unit 4 building. Through holes left by concrete panels smashed out we could see cable rooms, where no fires were observed. However, from the central reactor hall we clearly saw something like a blaze or glow... What was it? There is nothing except the reactor's "top face" in the central room, nothing was expected to burn there. We decided that it was the reactor itself that generated the glow. I called FFU-2 (the fire fighting unit serving the Chernobyl NPP only) and reported the situation for further transmission to Kiev... "

Telyatnikov visited the Unit Four control room, and was told by Deputy Chief Engineer Anatoly Dyatlov that with the fire on the roof of the turbine hall under control, the priority must be the roofs of Unit 3 and the ventilation block. Around 02:30, Telyatnikov ordered three firemen to the roof of the ventilation block to relieve the first group of firefighters which had been fighting the fires ignited there since the beginning of the emergency. This initial group, which included Volodymyr Pravyk, Viktor Kibenok, and Vasily Ignatenko, was already suffering from the effects of radiation exposure and descended the fire escape from the roof with difficulty. After their leader, Lieutenant Pravik, reported to Telyatnikov that the fire on the roof of the power station's third power unit had been extinguished, Telyatnikov, noting that he and the men with him appeared very unwell, ordered them into a nearby ambulance for evacuation to the Pripyat hospital. Soon after, on the south side of the station, Telyatnikov ascended the fire escape to the roof of the turbine hall and ordered firefighters there to maintain a fire watch there until relieved.

By 03:30, Telyatnikov was himself beginning to experience nausea and retching, initial symptoms of radiation exposure. He was evacuated to Sanitary Unit No. 126 – the Pripyat Hospital – around this time. Experiencing only the mild initial effects of radiation exposure, and unaware of the extent of his injuries, he was able to talk, smoke, and walk around with fellow firefighters.

=== Hospitalisation and recovery ===
As the extent of the disaster and the severity of the radiological injuries sustained by first responders began to be understood, the decision was made to evacuate Telyatnikov and the other hospitalized firefighters and plant staff to Moscow. By bus to Borispol Airport in Kiev, and from there to Moscow by air, he was taken to Hospital No.6, a hospital run by Sredmash (the state ministry for nuclear energy) and the All-Union Physics Institute, which had a specialized department for treating radiation injuries.

By this time, Telyatnikov was beginning to suffer from the more severe effects of his radiation exposure. He had lost consciousness in the course of transfer from Pripyat to Kiev by bus, and his condition continued to deteriorate. His bone marrow had been damaged by ionizing radiation, lowering his white blood cell count, weakening his immune system and leaving him vulnerable to bacteriological infection. He suffered from a fever of over 40 °C, and his lungs and respiratory tract became inflamed. His sisters and father were summoned to Moscow as potential bone marrow donors, should Telyatnikov's white blood cell count not recover and it prove necessary to attempt a bone marrow transplant.

However, Telyatnikov did begin to improve. And he was released from the isolation ward and allowed to walk around Hospital No. 6 in July, 1986, on his own, while wearing a gauze mask to protect his lungs from infection. It was at this time that he was first informed of the death of his subordinate Lt. Vladimir Pravik and the other five firemen who succumbed to ARS. He remained there until August, 1986, when he was transferred to a resort on the Latvian coast, and allowed to recuperate in the company of his wife and children. On September 5, 1986, he was released from the convalescent home. That same month, he was able to visit his parents in Kazakhstan. Frequent medication during hospitalization, however, had taken a toll on his liver, and Telyatnikov would return to hospital three times before the end of the year for treatment of this complication. He was released for the last time on December 22, 1986, ending seven months of medical treatment and recovery.

It is unclear what Telyatnikov's accumulated radiation dose was. Telyatnikov stated in a 1987 interview that it was "somewhere from 200 to 400 rem", but other sources claim that Telyatnikov received a dose of 450 to even 520 rem.

=== Post-recovery honours ===
The President of the British Fire Services Association presenting the Order of Gallantry, for bravery, to Major Telyatnikov, the Commander of the Chernobyl Fire Brigade.

After his recovery, Telyatnikov was honored in the Soviet media, including a front-page feature in Isvestia and spotlights on television and radio. He was honored with the Order of Lenin and the title of Hero of the Soviet Union by a decree of the Presidium of the Supreme Soviet on September 25, 1986.

=== International goodwill tour ===
In 1987, following his release from hospital and the completion of his recovery, Telyatnikov was sent on an international goodwill tour. Visiting Bulgaria, Japan, the United States, and Great Britain, he attended various state receptions, firefighter conventions, and other events. In Great Britain, he met Prime Minister Margaret Thatcher and received a medal from the British Firefighter's Union. Visiting the United States, in November 1987, he delivered an address at the Fourth Great National Firehouse Exposition and Muster, a firefighting convention in Baltimore, Maryland. In Japan, Telyatnikov attended a meeting of Doctors Without Borders for Nuclear Disarmament.

== Post-Chernobyl career (1986–1995) ==
Following his recovery and the end of his international tour, Telyatnikov returned to work in the Fire Department as commander of an MVD fire test laboratory. He served in this capacity until 1989. That year he was promoted to become the deputy head of the Regulatory and Technical Department of the Fire Safety Directorate of the Internal Affairs directorate of the Kiev Regional Executive Committee. He would hold this position through the dissolution of the USSR, until 1993.

In newly independent Ukraine, Telyatnikov was promoted to higher positions within the state fire brigade. In 1993, he became the Deputy Head of the Main Fire Directorate of the Ministry of internal Affairs of Ukraine. And in 1995, having attained the rank of Major General, Telyatnikov was promoted to head the State Fire Department of the Ministry of Internal Affairs, becoming commander of the entire Ukrainian state firefighting apparatus. Telyatnikov retired the same year.

== Post-retirement activities and death ==
Following his retirement, Telyatnikov remained active in firefighting as the chairman of the Kyiv Volunteer Firefighting Society from 1998. In this capacity he was responsible for organizing an annual children's firefighting festival, which would continue to be held after his death, and was subsequently rededicated in his honor. In 1996, by order of Ukrainian President Leonid Kuchma, Telyatnikov was awarded the Ukrainian Order for Courage, 3rd class.

In 2003, Telyatnikov was diagnosed with cancer of the jaw, which was almost certainly caused by his radiation poisoning from the accident. Invited to receive free treatment in Germany, he traveled to the country and underwent six months of treatment, including two operations. Though doctors were optimistic that he would recover, the cancer returned in the fall of 2004, and Telyatnikov died on December 2 of that year, at age 53.

His death was publicized by news agencies and his family received a letter of condolences from President Vladimir Putin of Russia.

== See also ==
- Deaths due to the Chernobyl disaster
- Liquidator (Chernobyl)

== General sources ==
- Kinzhakov, Ivan Vladimirovich. "Telyatnikov Leonid Petrovich". Patriotic Project “Heroes of the Country”.
- "Telyatnikov Leonid Petrovich: Hero of the Soviet Union, Veteran of Chernobyl". Пожарно-техническая выставка: Виртуальный интерактивный обучающий комплекс. ВДПО.
- Rybinskaya, Irina. "Non-Heroic Hero". FACTS.
- "Telyatnikov, Leonid Petrovich". Book of Memory: Participants in the Liquidation of the Chernobyl Accident (in Ukrainian). National Chornobyl Museum.
- Svetlov, Andrei (February 5, 2006). "Firefighters Against the Atom. How it Was". NuclearNo.ru.
- Plokhy, Serhii (2020). Chernobyl: The History of a Nuclear Catastrophe. New York: Basic Books. ISBN 9781541617087.
- Higgenbotham, Adam (2019). Midnight in Chernobyl. New York, NY: Simon and Schuster. ISBN 9781501134616.
- "Firefight at Chernobyl". omeka.net. Baltimore, MD: Fire Files Digital Library. 17 September 1987. Archived from the original on 28 November 2020.
