= Order for Courage =

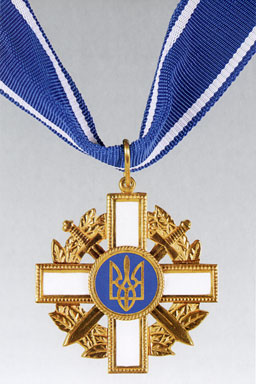
- Order for Courage
- Type: 3 grade order
- Awarded for: Individual courage and heroism while rescuing people or valued materials while endangering own life
- Presented by: Ukraine
- Eligibility: Any individual
- Status: issued
- Established: August 21, 1996
- First award: August 22, 1996 (2nd and 3rd Class)
- Ribbon of the Order for Courage

Precedence
- Next (higher): Order of the Heavenly Hundred Heroes
- Next (lower): Order of Princess Olga

The Order for Courage (Ukrainian: Орден «За мужність», romanized: Orden “Za muzhnist”) is a Ukrainian award established by Ukrainian president Leonid Kuchma on August 21, 1996. The medal is designed by Ukrainian artist Mykola Lebid.

== Awards of the President of Ukraine for Courage ==
Before August, 1996, personal bravery had been honoured with Awards of the President of Ukraine for Courage: the Star for Courage and the Cross for Courage instituted on April 29, 1995. On August 21, 1996, they were transformed into three classes of the Order for Courage. Recipients of Awards of the President of Ukraine, such as the Star for Courage and the Cross for Courage, are considered to be equal to the recipients of the Order for Courage and they are recognised as holders of the Order for Courage retaining the right to wear decorations that have been granted. Granting the Star For Courage and the Cross for Courage was discontinued following the institution of the Order for Courage.

the Star for Courage (1995–1996)	the Cross for Courage (1995–1996)

== Medals, star and ribbons ==
First Class	Second Class	Third Class
Ribbon

== Awardees ==
- Viktor Hurniak (1987–2014) - Ukrainian scout, photographer, volunteer killed in the Russian-Ukrainian War.
- Aleksandr Akimov (1953–1986) - Engineer and shift supervisor at the Chernobyl Nuclear Power Plant who worked tirelessly unto his death to mitigate the safety risks posed by the Chernobyl disaster.
- Leonid Toptunov (1960–1986) - In the control room at the reactor control panel at the moment of explosion, with Akimov; received fatal dose during attempts to restart feedwater flow into the reactor
- Valery Khodemchuk (1951–1986) - Engineer who was the night shift circulating pump operator at the Chernobyl power plant and was the first victim of Chernobyl disaster
- Yuri A. Vershynin - (died 28 July 1986) - In the turbine hall at the moment of explosion; received fatal dose (over 1,000 rad) during firefighting and stabilizing the turbine hall, died in a Moscow hospital
- Anatoly I. Shapovalov (died 19 May 1986) - Electrician during the Chernobyl disaster.
- Viktor V. Proskuryakov (died 17 May 1986) - Present in the control room at the moment of explosion; received fatal dose of radiation while attempting to enter the reactor hall to manually lower the control rods during the Chernobyl disaster
- Valery I. Perevozchenko (died 13 June 1986) - Foreman during the Chernobyl disaster. Received fatal dose of radiation during an attempt to locate and rescue Khodemchuk and others, approached the reactor hall together with Kudryavtsev and Proskuryakov
- Oleksandr V. Novyk (died 26 July 1986) - Turbine equipment machinist-inspector during Chernobyl disaster Received fatal dosage of more than 1,000 rad during firefighting and stabilizing the turbine hall.
- Vladimir I. Tishura (15 December 1959 – 10 May 1986) - First responding firefighter to the Chernobyl disaster. Received a fatal dose whilst extinguishing fires on the roof of reactor 3.
- Viktor N. Kibenok (17 February 1963 – 11 May 1986) - Chief of the Pripyat Fire Department, first responder to the Chernobyl disaster. Received a fatal dose of radiation while extinguishing fires on the roof of reactor 3 and around the ventilation chimney.
- Vladimir P. Pravik (13 June 1962 –11 May 1986) - The first firefighter to arrive on the scene of the Chernobyl disaster, coordinated firefighting efforts on the roof of the turbine hall and the roof of reactor 3. Received a fatal radiation dose while on the roof of reactor 3.
- Vasily I. Ignatenko (13 March 1961 – 13 May 1986) - First responding firefighter after the Chernobyl explosion. Extinguished fires around the ventilation chimney and helped carry his comrades down from the roof. He received a fatal radiation dose while on reactor 3's roof. (13 Sv)
- Leonid P. Telyatnikov (25 January 1951 – 2 December 2004) - Chief of the Chernobyl Nuclear Power Plant FD, arrived 10 minutes after the explosion and coordinated all firefighting efforts at the site. He also helped his men into ambulances. (6 Sv)
- Nikolai I. Titenok (5 December 1962 – 16 May 1986) - First responder to the Chernobyl disaster. He was a sergeant from the Pripyat Fire Department. Helped firefighting on the roof of reactor 3.
- Nina Strokata Karavanska (31 January 1926 – 2 August 1998) - "for civil courage, devotion in the struggle for the establishment of the ideals of freedom and democracy, and on the occasion of the 30th anniversary of the Ukrainian Public Group to promote the implementation of the Helsinki Accords.”
- Roman Mamasuyev (20 February 1983 - 22 December 2016), Ukrainian soldier from Alushta, Autonomous Republic of Crimea, fallen near Avdiivka.
- Viktor Chornobay (20 July 1983 - 20 July 2017), Ukrainian soldier from Kreminna, Luhansk Oblast, died near Krasnohorivka, while protecting a comrade with his own body.
- Dmytro Streknev (9 July 1997 - 6 April 2019) - Ukrainian soldier from Nyzhnia Duvanka, Luhansk Oblast, fallen near Zolote, for bravery and courage and in the defense of the homeland.
- Valeriy Herovkin (1999-2021), Ukrainian soldier from Kramatorsk
- Ivan Fedorov (born 29 August 1988) - Mayor of Melitopol, for bravery at the Battle of Melitopol.
- Jonathan Tseng (12 September 1997 – 2 November 2022) - Taiwanese volunteer, first East Asian killed in action during the Russian invasion of Ukraine, after successfully covering 3 colleagues to retreat in front line under siege.
- Trevor Kjeldal (? – 2 November 2022) - Australian sniper, returning from previous wound; Tseng's teammate, died in action of the same battle.
- Patron (born 2019) - Bomb-sniffing dog, awarded jointly with his handler Mykhailo Iliev.
- Mikhailo Dianov, soldier involved in the Mariupol resistance.
- Kyrylo Budanov, head of Main Directorate of Information of the Ukrainian Defense Ministry.
- Oleksiy Ananenko, (born 13 October 1959) - After the Chernobyl disaster, he was part of the three-man "suicide squad" that drained the steam suppression pools under the fourth reactor building.
- Oleksandr Kolchenko (born 26 November 1989), political activist from Crimea, who was held as a political prisoner by the Russian Federation for resisting against the ongoing occupation of the peninsula.
- Samuel Francis Thomas Newey , (2000 - 2023) - 22-year-old Birmingham-born British volunteer during the Russian Invasion of Ukraine.
- Luke Barrett Maczynski (born 20 February 2005) - American volunteer during the Russian Invasion of Ukraine. Analyst and battle action planner (планувальник бойових дій), awarded due to actions in the liberation of Pokrovsk and surrounding settlements in Donetsk Oblast.
