= Mitinskoe Cemetery =

Cemetery in Moscow

- Митинское кладбище
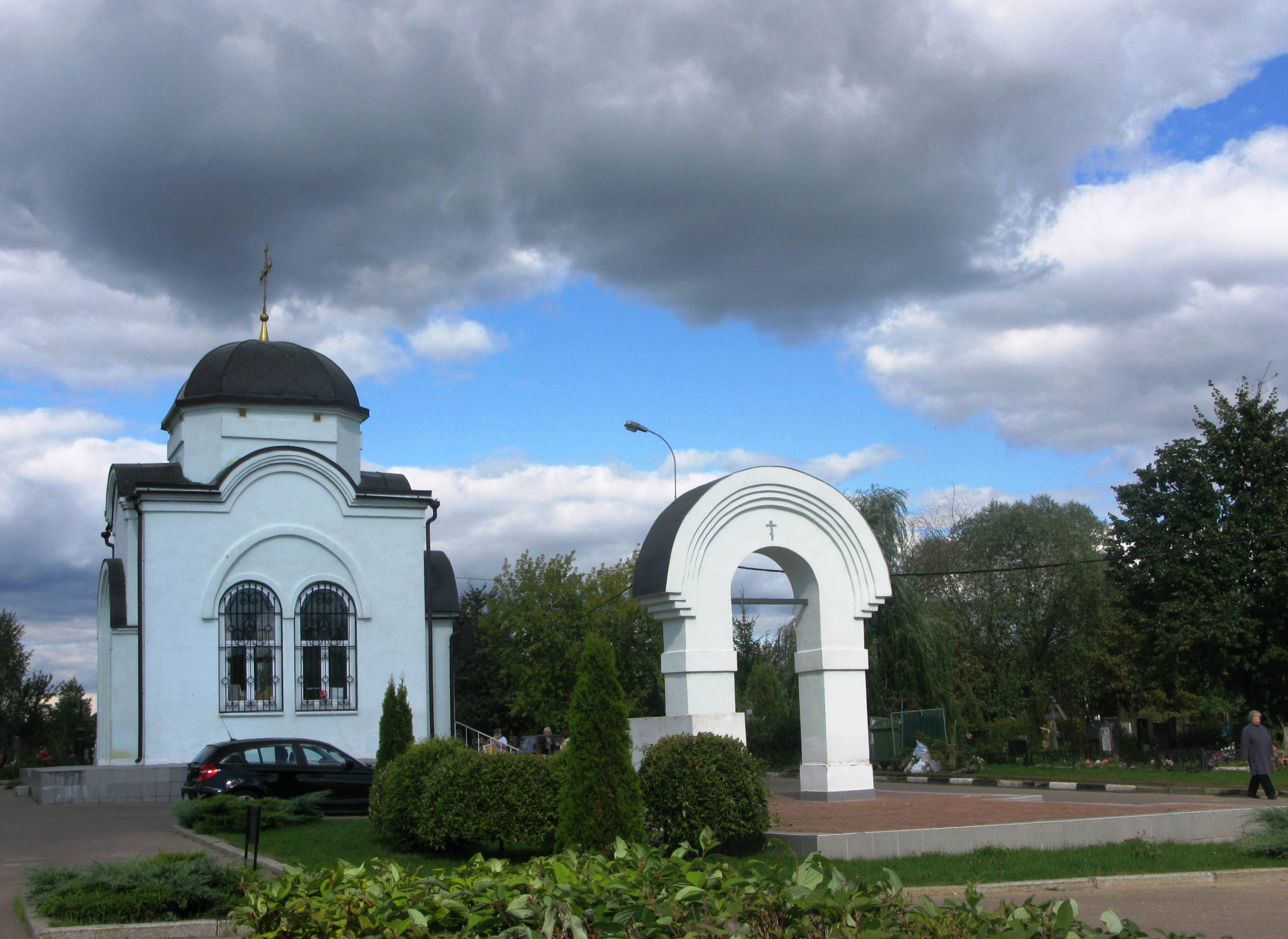
- Interactive map of Mitinskoe Cemetery

Details
- Established: 15 September 1978
- Location: Moscow
- Country: Russia
- Coordinates: 55°52′40″N 37°20′48″E
- Owned by: Government of Moscow
- Size: 108 hectares (270 acres)

Mitinskoe Cemetery (Russian: Ми́тинское кла́дбище) is a cemetery located in Moscow's North-Western Administrative Okrug. It was established on September 15, 1978. A Russian Orthodox church, which was built in 1998, is located on its grounds and has been visited several times by Patriarch Alexius II. The cemetery has a total area of 1,080,000 m^{2} (11,600,000 sq ft). The cemetery is the final resting place of firefighters and power plant workers who died while putting out the fires from the Chernobyl disaster, as well as eminent Soviet and Russian cultural, scientific, and military figures (including several Heroes of the Soviet Union and Russian Federation). Olympic Silver Medalist Viktor Logunov (1944–2022) is buried here.

Each year at 10 a.m. on 3 September, crowds gather at the cemetery and light thousands of candles in memory of the victims of the Beslan school hostage crisis.
