= 1:23:45 =

- Chernobyl episode
- Reactor No. 4 of the Chernobyl Nuclear Power Plant is on fire due to the explosion, while several firefighters attempt to put out the fire, unaware of the radiation exposure.
- Episode no.: Episode 1
- Directed by: Johan Renck
- Written by: Craig Mazin
- Cinematography by: Jakob Ihre
- Editing by: Jinx Godfrey
- Original air dates: May 6, 2019 (United States); May 7, 2019 (United Kingdom)
- Running time: 58 minutes

Guest appearances
- Adam Lundgren as Vyacheslav Brazhnik; Karl Davies as Viktor Proskuryakov; Donald Sumpter as Zharkov; Billy Postlethwaite as Boris Stolyarchuk; Joshua Leese as Igor Kirschenbaum; Nadia Clifford as Svetlana Zinchenko; Jamie Sives as Anatoly Sitnikov; Douggie McMeekin as Aleksandr Yuvchenko; Michael Socha as Mikhail; Jay Simpson as Valeriy Perevozchenko

Episode chronology
← Previous —	Next → "Please Remain Calm"

"1:23:45" is the series premiere of the historical drama television miniseries Chernobyl, which details the nuclear disaster that occurred on April 26, 1986, and the consequences that everyone involved faced. The episode was directed by Johan Renck and written by the series creator Craig Mazin, and aired on HBO in the United States on May 6, 2019 and on Sky Atlantic in the United Kingdom and Ireland on May 7, 2019. The episode details the explosion of the reactor 4 at the Chernobyl Nuclear Power Plant and the reactions of the citizens of Pripyat, particularly the plant workers and firefighters. Deputy Chief Engineer Anatoly Dyatlov (Paul Ritter) and the Pripyat Executive Committee dismiss the severity of the explosion, despite the core's exposure endangering the lives of its citizens.

Mazin started to research for the project in 2014, reading several books and government reports that detail the events that happened during the explosion and its aftermath. He also interviewed nuclear scientists and former Soviet citizens to understand how a nuclear reactor works and get a better idea of the culture in 1986. A companion podcast for the miniseries for each episode was released alongside the release of each episode, starting with "1:23:45" being released on May 6, 2019.

The episode received widespread acclaim from critics with praise towards the realistic depiction of the Chernobyl disaster, atmosphere, cinematography, and Ritter's performance. The initial broadcast of the episode through HBO drew over 756,000 viewers in the United States, while in the United Kingdom though Sky UK it managed to attract over 861,000 viewers. The episode won three Primetime Creative Arts Emmy Awards.

== Plot ==
On April 26, 1988, Valery Legasov records tapes revealing the truth of what really happened on the night of the Chernobyl disaster. Legasov manages to hide the tapes while avoiding being seen by the KGB (sitting in a car), then returns to his apartment and hangs himself (his death occurred one day after the second anniversary in real-life).

Two years prior, on April 26, 1986, Reactor No. 4 of the Chernobyl Nuclear Power Plant explodes near Pripyat, Ukraine. Firefighter Vasily Ignatenko and his pregnant wife Lyudmilla Ignatenko see the explosion (which casts an electric blue Ionized-air glow from the Power Plant) from their apartment. Inside the Power Plant's control room, Deputy Chief Engineer Anatoly Dyatlov refuses to believe that the Nuclear Core exploded despite both hearing the claims of some of the workers and seeing the scattered nuclear graphite on the roof of one of the buildings. While some of the badly injured engineers scramble to locate their missing colleagues, Dyatlov leaves the Plant to meet with the Pripyat Executive Committee, alongside Chernobyl manager Viktor Bryukhanov and chief engineer Nikolai Fomin. Before he leaves, Dyatlov forces Aleksandr Akimov and Leonid Toptunov to manually open the water valves to flood the damaged reactor and restore the cooling. They oblige, but by doing so, they are exposed to lethal radiation doses.

Vasily is called to the scene. He, and other firefighters and first responders, arrive and scramble to put out the fire. Due to the explosion, several blocks of nuclear graphite are spread around the rubble. After one of firefighters picks up one of these blocks, his hand becomes severely burned within seconds. Vasily, who is red from radiation burns, begins to suffer from acute radiation syndrome (ARS). Lyudmilla, fearing for the risks of the explosion, refuses to watch the fire from the road bridge alongside her neighbors, who inadvertently become exposed to high radiation doses.

Meanwhile, Dyatlov, Bryukhanov, and Fomin meet and conclude that while the reactor was badly damaged and a hydrogen explosion caused a leakage of contaminated water, the damage is under control. They, along with the committee, disregard the dangers of the explosion and the radiation, forbid the Pripyat residents to evacuate, and proceed to block all communication to the outside world. Chernobyl's deputy chief operational engineer Anatoly Sitnikov arrives and reports that the Nuclear Core is exposed after witnessing the damage. His claims are dismissed, and Bryukhanov and Fomin force Sitnikov to go to the roof to make a visual inspection after Dyatlov collapses from ARS. Sitnikov objects, but at gun point, does so and receives a fatal dose of radiation. He reports back to Bryukhanov and Fomin, but they still refuse to believe that the reactor exploded.

Legasov receives a call from the Council of Ministers' deputy chairman Boris Shcherbina, who orders him to provide technical advice to the committee managing the response. Meanwhile, wind carries radioactive smoke slowly towards Pripyat, creating the Red Forest and killing wildlife. Pripyat children walk to school, and when a bird falls from the sky and dies due to the radiation, the children are unaware of it.

== Production ==
=== Development ===
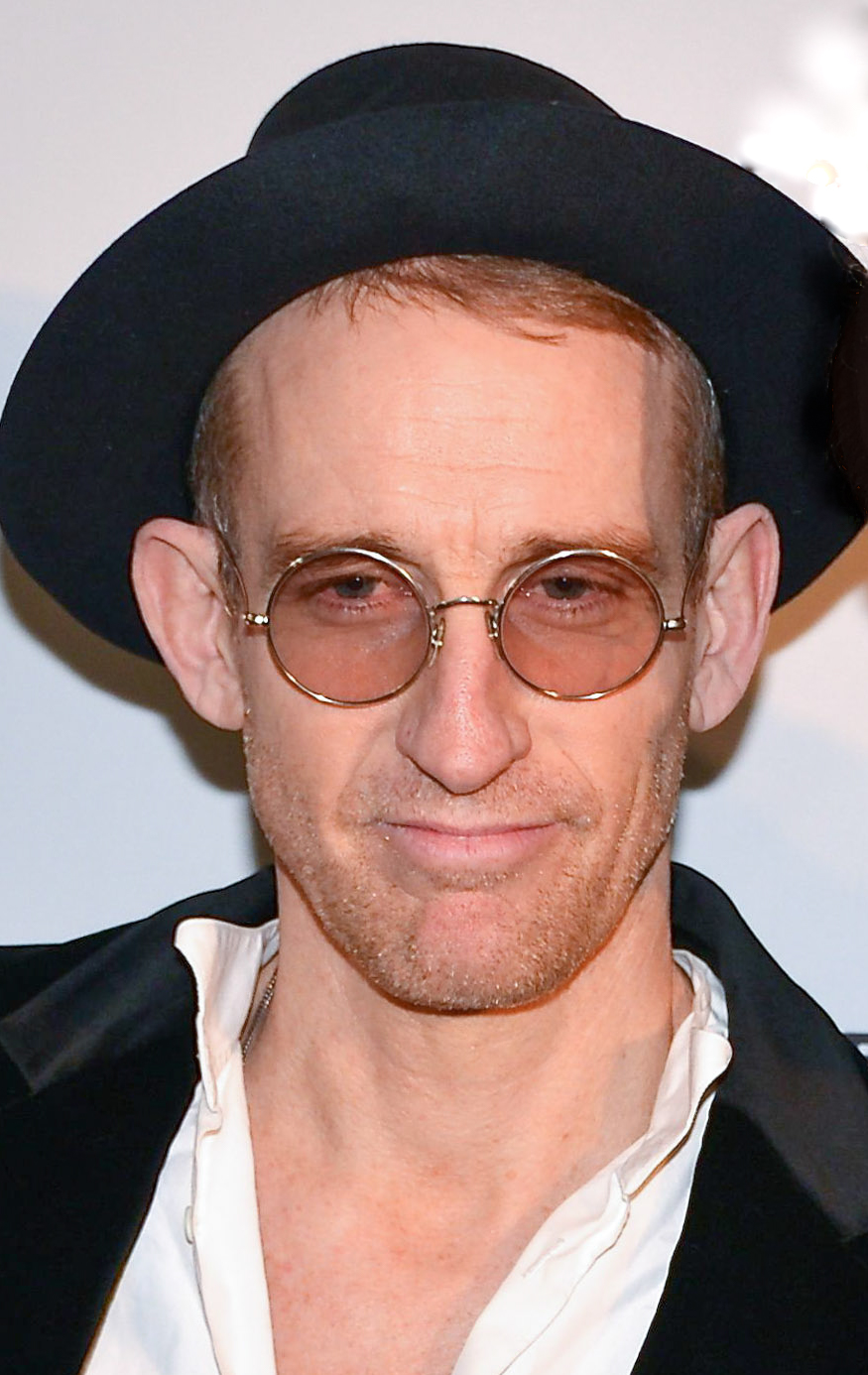
Series director Johan Renck was in charge of directing the episode.

Screenwriter Craig Mazin was recognized for primarily working in comedies for the last 20 years such as Scary Movie, Identity Thief, and The Hangover. Mazin considered working on Chernobyl easier than comedies, "It's brutal. It requires a sense of logic, and it requires a kind of intellectual capacity. Some of the smartest people I know are comedy writers. You have to be transgressive, but you also have to understand character. When I was writing Chernobyl, it seemed very natural to me." In order to capture the show's full scope of the explosion, Mazin went to the Chernobyl Exclusion Zone, stating: "That required kind of both living inside that mind in that culture and sharing the scripts early on with people who grew up in Soviet Ukraine and having them vet through things. Insane attention to tiny details, clothing, watches, glasses, everything. Shooting in Lithuania, a lot of our crew were old enough to remember what it was like living in the Soviet Union. They would let us know, ‘You know, if you brought your lunch to work, you would use a briefcase for that. You wouldn't use a paper bag."

In 2014, Mazin developed an interest in adapting the Chernobyl disaster and began researching for the project by reading books and interviewing nuclear scientists with the hopes of getting the most accurate portrayal of the explosion to the series. He stated: "Well, at the heart of this story is a question about what happens when we disconnect from the truth. And the Soviet system was essentially an enormous monument to the useful lie. They made lying an art: They lied to each other, they lied to the people above them, they lied to the people below them, and they did it out of a sense of survival. Ultimately, it just became expected, and the truth was debased. When it did kind of peek its head out, it was attacked. So I thought the worst possible thing I could do in telling a story like that would be to contribute to that problem by over-fictionalizing, over-dramatizing." He also revealed that he wanted to show the audience that lying, arrogance, and suppression of criticism are indeed the real danger that lead to the disaster and not nuclear power.

On July 26, 2017, it was announced that Johan Renck would direct the miniseries, having previously worked on some episodes of Breaking Bad and The Walking Dead. Renck expressed interest in directing the show after reading the script due to his interest on dark stories, explaining: "It basically started with a script showing up on my desk one day. The title alone interested me a lot because this kind of tragically dark, eerie and dramatic story tends to suit my taste. It's the stuff I respond to. I'm from Sweden originally and lived in Stockholm in 1986 when the catastrophe occurred, so I remember it vividly because while Sweden wasn't hit by it they were also the first ones to understand something had happened outside of the Soviet since they'd put a lid on it." The series horror elements were due to Renck wanting to portray the disaster with his "own feelings and perception of reality rather than trying to sort of work within the realm of film and have to use those traditional tools"

=== Casting ===
The producers originally intended to have Daniel Day-Lewis in the lead role as Valery Legasov, but the former retired from acting just a few days before the series announcement following the completation of his last film Phantom Thread. On June 26, 2017, it was confirmed that Jared Harris would be joining the series as Legasov; "I felt some responsibility, but I'm not playing the historical figure. The script made some changes to the real events to focus on the story between Legasov and Shcherbina, so you need to figure out your role in the story and then use your imagination to connect with the material." Instead of using a Russian accent, Harris used his natural one as the characters were ‘speaking in their own language’ and deemed that it would make better sense for the actors to use their respective accents.

On March 19, 2018, it was confirmed that Stellan Skarsgård would join the series in the role of Boris Shcherbina and stated: "Nobody would see it as a privilege to spend five months in a dilapidated nuclear plant, unless it was to play in a script like this by Craig Mazin, work with a director like Johan Renck, collaborate with a producer like Jane Featherstone, jam with an actor like Jared Harris and finally be at the feet of Emily Watson whom I have been missing for some 20 years." Adam Nagaitis and Jessie Buckley were cast in the series portraying Vasily Ignatenko and Lyudmilla Ignatenko respectively. The episode also stars Paul Ritter as Anatoly Dyatlov, Con O'Neill as Viktor Bryukhanov, Adrian Rawlins as Nikolai Fomin, Sam Troughton as Aleksandr Akimov, and Robert Emms as Leonid Toptunov.

=== Filming ===
The filming for the show began its principal photography in April 2018, in Lithuania, due to keeping the same architecture during its period of the country still being part of the Soviet Union. In order to portray the city of Pripyat for the series, filming took place at the residential district of Fabijoniškės in the city of Vilnius. The main reason for the crew to not film at Pripyat is due to the current deteriorating state that the city is in after its evacuation following the disaster, as it was needed to represent the city as it was during the time of the incident. Mazin also revealed that it is still dangerous to film close to Chernobyl, as 20,000 years need to pass in order to become available for human habitation again. The scenes that took place at the power plant were filmed at the Ignalina Nuclear Power Plant, which has been closed since 2009, due to both of them being very similar.

=== Title meaning ===
The episode's title refers to the exact time of the clock when the reactor 4 of the Chernobyl nuclear plant exploded, at 1:23:45 AM on April 26, 1986. It also depicts the exact time of when Legasov committed suicide in order to coincide with the second anniversary of the Chernobyl explosion. However, this is only used in the episode for dramatic purposes, as Legasov in reality committed suicide a day later.

== Reception ==
=== Ratings ===
"1:23:45" was first broadcast in the United States through HBO on May 6, 2019, where it was seen by 756,000 viewers and received a 0.19 rating in the 18-49 demographics. It was followed by its airing in the United Kingdom and Republic of Ireland through Sky Atlantic on May 7, 2019, where it obtained a total of 861,000 viewers.

=== Critical response ===
"1:23:45" received acclaim from critics. David Griffin from IGN commented "HBO's Chernobyl is a brilliant and emotionally draining dive into a horrific event. Stellan Skarsgård, Jared Harris, and Emily Watson give memorable performances that are amplified by Johan Renck's skillful direction and Craig Mazin's sharp writing. While the horrors of Chernobyl might be difficult to stomach, the narrative journey is worth sticking around for... Even if it causes you to squirm from time to time." Ed Cumming from The Independent rated the episode with 5 stars and stated: "The threat of nuclear war may have abated but as metaphors, radiation and fallout are as powerful as they were 30 years ago. Timely, bleak, intelligent and compelling, Chernobyl is a triumph of a disaster." Adam Starkey from Metro also gave the episode 5 stars and considered that "Some might find Chernobyl too bleak to enjoy, but very few shows land with such a startling and unsettling first impression. As entertainment, a retelling of the disaster, and a warning of scarily relevant dangers, Chernobyl is a staggering, unmissable achievement which will haunt you for weeks."

Lucy Mangan from The Guardian gave the episode 3 stars praising Ritter's performance and calling it "part of a uniformly excellent parade of performances fighting to make coherence out of chaos", but was critical of not showing more of the accurate effects, hoping that the show would improve in the following episodes: "With Jared Harris starring, this miniseries about the 1986 meltdown should be gripping – but instead strands viewers in a bewildering cloud of unanswered questions." David Fear from the Rolling Stone rated the episode with 3.5 stars and stated that the series "spend(s) some five fours showing how a perfect storm of screw-ups and cover-ups led to a genuine catastrophe, as well as diving into an aftermath of devastation that plays like a slow-motion nightmare." Sophie Gilbert from The Atlantic lauded the performances of the three lead actors "that are titans that they manage to carry off dialogue that could be cumbersome in lesser hands. While not much wears faster than bad Vladivostok burrs from RADA trained artists, the cadences here are so extremely British that cultural dissonance sometimes sets in." Keith Phipps from TV Guide praised the show for its accuracies, stating, "The series details what took place before and after the reactor explosion but also the conditions that allowed it to happen, and which came close to making it even worse. As such, it doubles as a warning about who pays the cost when the hard facts of science butt up against political agendas, whether decades ago on the other side of the Iron Curtain or here and now. Some bad decisions have half-lives that last for centuries."

Allison Keene from Collider rated the show with a perfect score of 5 stars and considered the show to be a "cautionary tale bigger than just the nuclear power industry, or even the environment. The cautionary tale here is about what happens when people choose to ignore the truth. It doesn't care, as it turns out – the truth does not care. The world gets hotter whether we agree with it or not, and that is something that I hope people can take away from the show – that in the end, we have choices about what we will or will not confront as true, but the truth does not care, and it will come to pass." Nick Schager from The Daily Beast stated that "Chernobyl has transformed from a story about plant-operator faults to one about systematic deception on the part of the stubborn, arrogant, blind and foolish Soviets, whose communist culture—demanding absolute loyalty to the Party, which is always perfect and infallible, even when facts say otherwise—compelled everyone to cover up the truth lest they be vilified as nation-besmirching traitors."

=== Accolades ===
Year	Award	Category	Nominee	Result	Ref.
2020	Primetime Creative Emmy Awards	Outstanding Sound Editing for a Limited Series, Movie, or Special	Stefan Henrix, Joe Beal, Michael Maroussas, Harry Barnes, Andy Wade, Anna Wright	Won	
2020	Primetime Creative Emmy Awards	Outstanding Sound Mixing for a Limited Series or Movie	Stuart Hilliker and Vincent Piponnier	Won	
2020	Primetime Creative Emmy Awards	Outstanding Special Visual Effects in a Supporting Role	Max Dennison, Lindsay McFarlane, Claudius Christian Rauch, Clare Cheetham, Laura Bethencourt Montes, Steven Godfrey, Luke Letkey, Christian Waite and William Foulser	Won	
2020	Visual Effects Society Awards	Outstanding Supporting Visual Effects in a Photoreal Episode	Max Dennison, Lindsay McFarlane, Clare Cheetham, Paul Jones and Claudius Christian Rauch	Won	
