= Anatoly Dyatlov =

Soviet nuclear engineer in charge during the Chernobyl disaster (1931–1995)

- Анатолий Дятлов
- Dyatlov in 1987
- Born: 3 March 1931; Atamanovo, Krasnoyarsk Krai, Russian SFSR, Soviet Union
- Died: 13 December 1995 (aged 64); Kyiv, Ukraine
- Other name: Анатолій Степанович Дятлов (in Ukrainian)
- Citizenship: Soviet, Ukrainian
- Education: Moscow Engineering Physics Institute
- Known for: Deputy chief-engineer of the Chernobyl Nuclear Power Plant
- Criminal charge: Gross violation of safety regulations
- Criminal penalty: Sentenced to 10 years in prison (released in 1990)

Anatoly Stepanovich Dyatlov (Russian: Анатолий Степанович Дятлов; 3 March 1931 – 13 December 1995) was a Soviet nuclear engineer who was the deputy chief engineer for the Chernobyl Nuclear Power Plant. He supervised the safety test which resulted in the 1986 Chernobyl disaster, for which he served time in prison as he was blamed for not following the safety protocols. He was released due to health concerns in 1990, and died in 1995 at the age of 64, most likely attributed to radiation exposure.

== Biography ==
Dyatlov was born on 3 March 1931 in Atamanovo, a village in the Sukhobuzimsky District of Krasnoyarsk Krai, Russian SFSR, Soviet Union. His family lived near the Yenisei River. At the age of 14, he left home and subsequently studied electrical engineering at a vocational school in Norilsk. He worked as an electrician for three years before entering the Moscow Engineering Physics Institute, from which he graduated with honors in 1959.

After graduating, Dyatlov worked at a shipbuilding facility in Komsomolsk-on-Amur, where he was involved in the installation of nuclear reactors in submarines. He was exposed to radiation during a nuclear accident at the facility and received a significant radiation dose. Accounts differ concerning the circumstances of the accident and its precise connection to particular submarine operations.

Dyatlov had two sons; one died of leukemia at the age of nine. He was also interested in poetry and was particularly fond of Alexander Pushkin's Eugene Onegin, which he reportedly memorized.

=== Chernobyl ===
In 1973, Dyatlov moved to Pripyat, in the Ukrainian SSR, to work at the newly constructed Chernobyl Nuclear Power Plant. His previous experience with naval reactors made him one of the plant's senior engineering managers. He served as deputy chief engineer for operations and was responsible for Units 3 and 4.

Dyatlov was regarded by some colleagues as a highly knowledgeable and technically capable engineer, but his management style was considered demanding and authoritarian by others. Accounts of his relationship with subordinates differ: some workers respected his technical expertise and discipline, while others regarded him as harsh and difficult to work with.

On 26 April 1986, Dyatlov supervised a test at Unit 4 of the Chernobyl Nuclear Power Plant. The test was intended to determine whether the turbine generator could provide sufficient electrical power to operate essential equipment during the interval between a loss of external power and the activation of the emergency diesel generators.

During preparations for the test, reactor power was reduced. The power subsequently fell much further than intended, reaching a level of approximately 30 MW thermal. The operators then began raising the power again. By this point, the reactor was affected by xenon poisoning, which reduced its reactivity and made further power increases difficult. The operators withdrew a large number of control rods in an effort to restore the desired power level.

The reactor was eventually stabilized at approximately 200 MW thermal, below the level originally envisaged for the test. The test proceeded despite the reactor's unstable operating conditions and the withdrawal of a large number of control rods. According to the International Nuclear Safety Advisory Group, the accident resulted from several interacting factors, including characteristics of the RBMK reactor design, deficiencies in the design of its control rods, shortcomings in operating procedures, and the reactor being operated in a state that had not been adequately assessed from a safety perspective.

Dyatlov later gave his own account of the events. He stated that he had not regarded the temporary reduction in reactor power as an abnormal or dangerous situation and that he authorized the operators to continue increasing the power.

During the test, the operators activated the AZ-5 emergency shutdown system. The insertion of the control rods produced an unexpected increase in reactor reactivity, followed by a rapid power surge. The reactor was destroyed by a series of explosions.

Following the explosions, Dyatlov initially remained in the control room and attempted to assess the condition of the reactor. He ordered actions intended to restore water circulation and cooling, before leaving the control room to inspect the damage. He subsequently went to the administration building and reported the situation to plant management.

Dyatlov suffered severe radiation exposure and developed acute radiation syndrome. He was initially treated at a hospital in Pripyat before being transferred to Hospital No. 6 in Moscow, which specialized in the treatment of radiation injuries.

=== After the accident ===
Dyatlov, together with Chernobyl plant director Viktor Bryukhanov and chief engineer Nikolai Fomin, was charged with violating safety regulations in connection with the accident.

The trial began on 6 July 1987 at the Palace of Culture in Chernobyl. Six people were tried: Bryukhanov, Fomin, Dyatlov, shift supervisor Boris Rogozhkin, reactor division chief Alexander Kovalenko, and state nuclear inspector Yuri Laushkin. The defendants were charged under Soviet and Ukrainian criminal law with violations of safety regulations.

Dyatlov disputed the prosecution's account of the accident and argued that the operators had been unfairly blamed for a disaster in which the reactor's design deficiencies had played a major role. He also disputed aspects of the testimony concerning his location and actions during the reduction and subsequent increase in reactor power.

The court found all six defendants guilty. Dyatlov was sentenced to ten years' imprisonment, the maximum sentence imposed on the defendants.

While imprisoned, Dyatlov continued to argue that the design of the RBMK reactor was a major cause of the accident. He later published his account of the disaster, including a paper in Nuclear Engineering International in 1991 and the book Chernobyl: How It Happened in 1995.

Dyatlov was released from prison in 1990 as part of an amnesty, after his health had deteriorated following the accident.

Later investigations substantially revised the earlier Soviet interpretation of the disaster. The International Atomic Energy Agency's INSAG-7 report concluded that the accident could not be attributed solely to the actions of the plant operators. It identified deficiencies in the RBMK reactor's physical and control-system design, inadequate safety analysis, weaknesses in operating procedures, and shortcomings in the dissemination of safety information as significant factors. At the same time, the report continued to identify violations of operating procedures and other inappropriate actions by the plant personnel as contributing factors.

Dyatlov continued to maintain that the operators had received an excessive share of the blame and that the reactor's design deficiencies were central to the disaster. His account became part of the broader reassessment of responsibility for the accident following the dissolution of the Soviet Union.

Dyatlov died in Kyiv, Ukraine, on 13 December 1995, aged 64. He had suffered serious health problems following his radiation exposure at Chernobyl.

== In media ==
Dyatlov has been depicted several times in dramatizations of the disaster and its aftermath. He has been portrayed by Igor Slavinskiy in the 2004 series Zero Hour: Disaster At Chernobyl, by Roger Alborough in the 2006 BBC production Surviving Disaster: Chernobyl Nuclear Disaster and by Paul Ritter in the 2019 HBO miniseries Chernobyl.

Dyatlov's memoirs were recorded in 1994, a year before his death. The recording was made by an unknown operator and appeared on YouTube in 2016. A version with English subtitles was provided in 2019.

== See also ==
- List of Chernobyl-related articles
- Individual involvement in the Chernobyl disaster
- Vasily Ignatenko
- Boris Shcherbina
- Valery Legasov
