= Chernobyl (miniseries) =

2019 historical drama television miniseries

- Promotional poster
- Genre: Historical drama; Disaster; Tragedy
- Created by: Craig Mazin
- Written by: Craig Mazin
- Directed by: Johan Renck
- Starring: Jared Harris; Stellan Skarsgård; Paul Ritter; Jessie Buckley; Adam Nagaitis; Con O'Neill; Adrian Rawlins; Sam Troughton; Robert Emms; Emily Watson; David Dencik; Mark Lewis Jones; Alan Williams; Alex Ferns; Ralph Ineson; Barry Keoghan; Fares Fares; Michael McElhatton
- Composer: Hildur Guðnadóttir
- Countries of origin: United States; United Kingdom
- Original language: English
- No. of episodes: 5

Production
- Executive producers: Craig Mazin; Carolyn Strauss; Jane Featherstone
- Producer: Sanne Wohlenberg
- Production locations: Lithuania; Ukraine
- Cinematography: Jakob Ihre
- Editors: Jinx Godfrey; Simon Smith
- Camera setup: Single-camera
- Running time: 59–71 minutes
- Production companies: HBO; Sky UK; Sister Pictures; The Mighty Mint; Word Games

Original release
- Network: HBO (US); Sky Atlantic (UK)
- Release: May 6 – June 3, 2019

Chernobyl is a 2019 historical drama television miniseries that revolves around the Chernobyl disaster of 1986 and the cleanup efforts that followed. The series was created and written by Craig Mazin and directed by Johan Renck. It features an ensemble cast led by Jared Harris, Stellan Skarsgård, Emily Watson, and Paul Ritter. The series was produced by HBO in the United States and Sky UK in the United Kingdom.

The five-part series premiered simultaneously (Note: Episodes were broadcast concurrently on HBO and Sky Atlantic, on Monday at 9:00 pm EDT/Tuesday at 2:00 am BST respectively.) in the United States on May 6, 2019, and in the United Kingdom on May 7. It received widespread critical acclaim for its performances, historical accuracy, atmosphere, tone, screenplay, cinematography, and musical score. At the 71st Primetime Emmy Awards, it received nineteen nominations and won for Outstanding Limited Series, Outstanding Directing, and Outstanding Writing, while Harris, Skarsgård, and Watson received acting nominations. At the 77th Golden Globe Awards, the series won for Best Miniseries or Television Film and Skarsgård won for Best Supporting Actor in a Series, Miniseries or Television Film. At the 2020 BAFTA TV Awards it won best miniseries and Harris won for Best Actor.

The release of each episode was accompanied by a podcast in which Mazin and NPR host Peter Sagal discuss instances of artistic license and the reasoning behind them. While critics, experts and witnesses have noted historical and factual discrepancies in the series, the creators' attention to detail has been widely praised.

== Premise ==
Chernobyl dramatizes the story of the April 1986 nuclear plant disaster which occurred in the Ukrainian Soviet Socialist Republic, Soviet Union, telling the stories of the people who were involved in the disaster and those who responded to it. The series depicts some of the lesser-known stories of the disaster, including the efforts of the firefighters who were the first responders on the scene, volunteers, and teams of miners who dug a critical tunnel under Reactor 4.

The miniseries is based in large part on the recollections of Pripyat locals, as told by Belarusian Nobel laureate Svetlana Alexievich in her book Voices from Chernobyl. Researchers have documented Alexievich's insertion of her own words into the testimonies of her interview subjects in this and others of her books, as well as her extensive revision—even from one edition to the next—of her interviews, which suggests that her works should not be taken as verbatim oral history.

== Cast and characters ==
=== Main ===
- Jared Harris as Valery Legasov, the deputy director of the Kurchatov Institute brought in to aid cleanup efforts.
- Stellan Skarsgård as Boris Shcherbina, a Council of Ministers' deputy chairman.
- Emily Watson as Ulana Khomyuk, a nuclear physicist from Minsk. Khomyuk is a fictional composite character based on the many scientists who investigated the accident.
- Paul Ritter as Anatoly Dyatlov, the deputy chief engineer at the Chernobyl Nuclear Power Plant.
- Jessie Buckley as Lyudmilla Ignatenko, the wife of Vasily Ignatenko.
- Adam Nagaitis as Vasily Ignatenko, a Pripyat firefighter and first responder to the Chernobyl fire.
- Con O'Neill as Viktor Bryukhanov, the director of Chernobyl.
- Adrian Rawlins as Nikolai Fomin, the chief engineer at Chernobyl.
- Sam Troughton as Aleksandr Akimov, the night shift supervisor at Chernobyl.
- Robert Emms as Leonid Toptunov, the senior engineer at Chernobyl.
- David Dencik as Mikhail Gorbachev, the General Secretary of the Communist Party of the Soviet Union.
- Mark Lewis Jones as Vladimir Pikalov, the commander of the Soviet chemical forces.
- Alan Williams as Charkov, the KGB's first deputy chairman.
- Alex Ferns as Andrei Glukhov, the mining crew chief.
- Ralph Ineson as Nikolai Tarakanov, the chief supervisor of the cleanup operation.
- Barry Keoghan as Pavel Gremov, a civilian liquidator draftee.
- Fares Fares as Bacho, a Georgian soldier and Soviet–Afghan War veteran who trains Pavel.
- Michael McElhatton as Andrei Stepashin, the prosecutor for the trial of Dyatlov, Bryukhanov, and Fomin.

=== Recurring ===
- Adam Lundgren as Vyacheslav Brazhnik, the senior turbine operator at Chernobyl.
- Karl Davies as Viktor Proskuryakov, a senior reactor control engineer trainee at Chernobyl.
- Donald Sumpter as Zharkov, a Pripyat executive committee member.
- Billy Postlethwaite as Boris Stolyarchuk, the senior unit No. 4 control engineer at Chernobyl.
- Joshua Leese as Igor Kirschenbaum, a senior turbine control engineer at Chernobyl.
- Nadia Clifford as Svetlana Zinchenko, a doctor treating Vasily Ignatenko and others with radiation sickness.
- Jamie Sives as Anatoly Sitnikov, the deputy chief operational engineer at Chernobyl sent to inspect the exploded core.
- Baltasar Breki Samper as Alexei Ananenko, one of the volunteers who drained water in Chernobyl's basement to prevent an explosion.
- Philip Barantini as Valery Bespalov, one of the volunteers who drained water in Chernobyl's basement to prevent an explosion.
- Oscar Giese as Boris Baranov, one of the volunteers who drained water in Chernobyl's basement to prevent an explosion.
- Douggie McMeekin as Aleksandr Yuvchenko, a senior engineer-mechanic on duty the night of the explosion.
- Michael Socha as Mikhail, a resident of Pripyat and father of a young baby who are both present on the bridge watching the fire.

=== Guest ===
- Natasha Radski as Russian news reader
- Jay Simpson as Valeriy Perevozchenko, the foreman in the reactor section
- Michael Colgan as Mikhail Shchadov, Soviet Minister of Coal Industry
- James Cosmo as a miner
- Peter Guinness as Major Burov
- Hilton McRae as Milan Kadnikov, the judge presiding over the trial of Dyatlov, Bryukhanov, and Fomin
- Kieran O'Brien as Valery Khodemchuk, the night shift main circulating pump operator at Chernobyl
- Alexej Manvelov as Garo, an Armenian soldier who accompanies Bacho and Pavel
- June Watson as Old Woman
- Josef Altin as Soldier
- Josef Davies as Janek

== Episodes ==
No.	Title	Directed by	Written by	Original air date (EDT)	US viewers (millions) (Note: Live+Same Day data.)	UK viewers (millions) (Note: Live+7 Days four-screen data.)
1	"1:23:45"	Johan Renck	Craig Mazin	May 6, 2019	0.756	0.861
Exactly two years after the Chernobyl Nuclear disaster, Soviet chemist Valery Legasov secretly records a series of memoirs, then hangs himself in his Moscow apartment. At 1:23:45 am on April 26, 1986, Reactor No. 4 explodes at the Chernobyl Nuclear Power Plant near Pripyat, Ukrainian SSR. Inside the control room, Deputy Chief Engineer Anatoly Dyatlov denies initial reports that the core is exposed, believing this to be impossible. He orders Aleksandr Akimov and Leonid Toptunov to control the core by manually adding water and Emergency Services, including Vasily Ignatenko, to extinguish the fire. All are unknowingly exposed to lethal radiation doses, as are Pripyat civilians who gather to watch the fire from a nearby bridge. Dyatlov meets with Plant Director Viktor Bryukhanov and Chief Engineer Nikolai Fomin, who decide to lock down the city and cut phone lines to prevent panic and misinformation. Despite his denial of the core exposure, Dyatlov witnesses dozens of first responders already suffering from acute radiation syndrome (ARS). Legasov is summoned to the Kremlin to advise USSR General Secretary Mikhail Gorbachev on the disaster response.
2	"Please Remain Calm"	Johan Renck	Craig Mazin	May 13, 2019	1.004	0.891
Seven hours after the explosion, nuclear physicist Ulana Khomyuk detects a radiation spike in Minsk, Byelorussian SSR, and predicts that it's from Chernobyl. At Pripyat Hospital 6, Lyudmilla Ignatenko learns that her husband Vasily is being transported to Moscow with other severe ARS patients. At the Kremlin, Deputy Chairman Boris Shcherbina meets with Gorbachev and the Soviet Central Committee and echoes Dyatlov's false report. Legasov deduces that the core is exposed and persuades Gorbachev to send him and Shcherbina to investigate. Bryukhanov and Fomin blame Legasov for spreading dangerous misinformation, but Shcherbina arrests them when Vladimir Pikalov proves the core's exposure with an accurate dosimeter reading. After assuring civilians that they are safe, Legasov privately tells Shcherbina that they have both already received a lethal radiation dose, convincing him to evacuate Pripyat. Legasov and Shcherbina direct the core fire to be smothered with sand and boron, unaware that the underlying water reservoirs are full. Speaking in code with another nuclear physicist, Khomyuk learns of these efforts and informs Legasov that the superheated sand will volatilize the water tanks, triggering a catastrophic steam explosion. Gorbachev authorizes three plant workers to drain the reservoirs, but the radiation disrupts the batteries in their flashlights, leaving them in pitch darkness.
3	"Open Wide, O Earth"	Johan Renck	Craig Mazin	May 20, 2019	1.063	1.100
The three workers use hand-pumped flashlights and drain the basement reservoirs. Gorbachev authorizes a team of miners from Tula, Russian SFSR to excavate an area beneath the core and install a heat exchanger, preventing a nuclear meltdown. Shcherbina privately informs Legasov of their overt surveillance by the KGB. Legasov instructs Khomyuk to interview Dyatlov, Akimov and Toptunov and investigate the cause of the explosion. Lyudmilla arrives in Moscow, where Vasily seems to be recovering. Legasov explains that this is a "latency period", after which the body's internal organ systems will atrophy. Within weeks, Vasily, Akimov and Toptunov suffer agonizing deaths, but only after the latter two willingly share their accounts with Khomyuk. She learns that the emergency shutdown procedure (button AZ-5) triggered the explosion, which was deemed impossible. Khomyuk witnesses Lyudmilla with her irradiated husband and threatens the nurse for allowing it. The KGB arrests her, but release her at Legasov's demand. Lyudmilla watches as Vasily and other first responders are buried in a mass grave and sealed in concrete.
4	"The Happiness of All Mankind"	Johan Renck	Craig Mazin	May 27, 2019	1.193	1.311
Legasov expands the Chernobyl Exclusion Zone and conscripts hundreds of liquidators to decontaminate the surrounding environment. This includes a team dispatched to kill all surviving pets and wildlife. Legasov and Shcherbina attempt to clear Nuclear graphite and other debris from the Chernobyl rooftop using a German robot. However, its circuitry is fried by the radiation, which was underreported by the Soviet Central Committee to avoid humiliation. Shcherbina and General Nikolai Tarakanov are forced to enlist 3,828 liquidators in 90-second missions to clear the debris by hand. Even with protection, many liquidators later develop cancers or have children with birth defects due to radiation exposure. Despite Soviet State redactions and secrecy, Khomyuk learns that AZ-5 causes a brief spike in nuclear reactivity due to a design flaw. Legasov knew this fact from a colleague who warned the Kremlin 10 years prior, but was rebuked. Khomyuk urges Legasov to expose this design flaw at a conference in Vienna, but Shcherbina warns him of the risks and proposes a KGB deal to fix the reactors in secret. Lyudmilla gives birth, but her baby dies within four hours due to radiation exposure from Vasily.
5	"Vichnaya Pamyat" (Note: Ukrainian for "Memory Eternal", an exclamation used in Eastern Orthodox funeral or memorial services.)	Johan Renck	Craig Mazin	June 3, 2019	1.089	2.112
Twelve hours before the explosion, Bryukhanov, Fomin, and Dyatlov learn that a planned safety test must be scrapped. But, hoping to win promotions, they decide to proceed after a short delay. The KGB awards Legasov for omitting the AZ-5 design flaw from his testimony at the Vienna conference. They also insist that design reforms must wait until after the trial of Dyatlov, Fomin and Bryukhanov, whom the Soviet State is hoping to blame for the disaster. Legasov and Khomyuk do not trust the State to follow through. At the trial, Legasov explains how Bryukhanov, Fomin and Dyatlov's mismanagement of the safety test pushed the reactor to the brink of meltdown. He then details the fatal design flaw of the AZ-5 emergency shutdown button, admitting that his Vienna testimony was a lie and that Dyatlov, Akimov and Toptunov rightly believed the button to be infallible because of the Soviet State's secrecy. As punishment, the KGB strips Legasov of his titles and awards and isolates him from the scientific community. However, Legasov's suicide causes his memoirs to be widely circulated among them and forces the USSR to admit the truth and retrofit its remaining nuclear reactors.

== Production ==
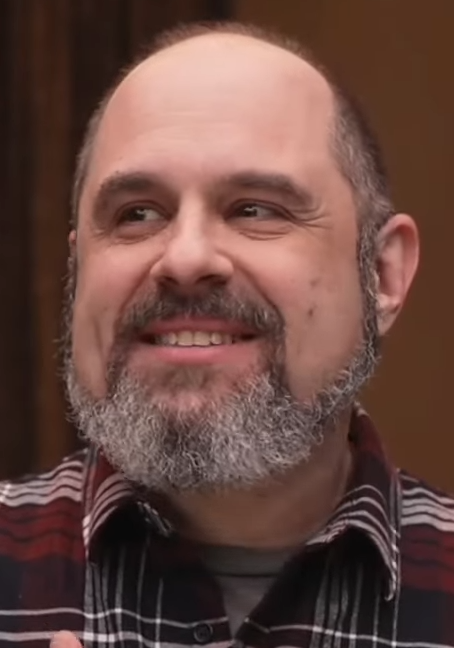
Craig Mazin was the writer, creator, and producer of Chernobyl.

=== Development and writing ===
In 2014, writer Craig Mazin began researching for the project by reading books and government reports from inside and outside the Soviet Union. Mazin also interviewed nuclear scientists to learn how a reactor works, and former Soviet citizens to gain a better idea of the culture in 1986. Mazin also read several first-person accounts to bring additional authenticity to the story. He explained, "When you're reading the personal stories of people who were there—people who lived near the plant, people who worked at the plant, people who were sent to Chernobyl as part of the effort to clean it up—in those individual accounts, that's really where the story came alive".

Mazin's interest in creating the series originated when he decided to write something that addressed "how we're struggling with the global war on the truth right now". Another inspiration is that he knew Chernobyl exploded, but he did not know why. He explained, "I didn't know why, and I thought there was this inexplicable gap in my knowledge ... So, I began reading about it, just out of this very dry, intellectual curiosity, and what I discovered was that, while the story of the explosion is fascinating, and we make it really clear exactly why and how it happened, what really grabbed me and held me were the incredible stories of the human beings who lived through it, and who suffered and sacrificed to save the people that they loved, to save their countrymen and to save a continent, and continued to do so, against odds that were startling and kept getting worse. I was so moved by it. It was like I had discovered a war that people just hadn't really depicted, and I became obsessed". Mazin said that "The lesson of Chernobyl isn't that modern nuclear power is dangerous. The lesson is that lying, arrogance, and suppression of criticism are dangerous".

In preparation for the miniseries, Mazin visited the Chernobyl Exclusion Zone. Mazin made the decision in the early stages not to use Russian or Ukrainian accents, and instead, have the actors use their natural accents. Mazin explained, "We had an initial thought that we didn't want to do the 'Boris and Natasha' clichéd accent because the Russian accent can turn comic very easily. At first, we thought that maybe we would have people do these sorts of vaguely Eastern European accents—not really strong but noticeable. What we found very quickly is that actors will act accents. They will not act, they will act accents and we were losing everything about these people that we loved. Honestly, I think after maybe one or two auditions we said 'OK, new rule. We're not doing that anymore'". As a result, actors Stellan Skarsgård, Jessie Buckley and Barry Keoghan spoke in their native Swedish and Irish accents respectively, and Mazin also did not cast any American actors, as that could potentially pull the audience out of the story.

In early 2017, Carolyn Strauss joined the project as producer, and pitched the show with Mazin to HBO's Kary Antholis. According to Antholis: "It was the best pitch I've heard in 25 years of listening to pitches—there's nothing that really comes close to it". Regardless, viewership expectations remained low during development, and the series was eventually assigned a Monday night time slot. Antholis convinced Sky UK to co-produce, lessening HBO's financial burden to around $15 million of the show's $40 million budget.

On July 26, 2017, it was announced that HBO and Sky had given a series order to Chernobyl. It was HBO's first co-production with Sky UK. The five-episode miniseries was written by Craig Mazin and directed by Johan Renck. Mazin also served as an executive producer alongside Carolyn Strauss and Jane Featherstone, with Chris Fry and Renck acting as co-executive producers. On March 11, 2019, it was announced that the miniseries would premiere on May 6, 2019. On June 4, 2019, Craig Mazin made the original scripts of all episodes available for downloading as PDFs (see External links below).

A companion podcast for the miniseries had new episodes published as each TV episode aired on HBO. The podcast featured conversations between Mazin and host Peter Sagal including discussions of where the show was as true as possible to historical events and where events were consolidated or modified as part of artistic license.

=== Casting ===
Simultaneously with the initial series announcement, it was confirmed that Jared Harris would star in the series. On March 19, 2018, it was announced that Stellan Skarsgård and Emily Watson had joined the main cast, marking their second collaboration after Breaking the Waves. In May 2018, it was announced that Paul Ritter, Jessie Buckley, Adrian Rawlins, and Con O'Neill also had joined the cast.

=== Filming ===
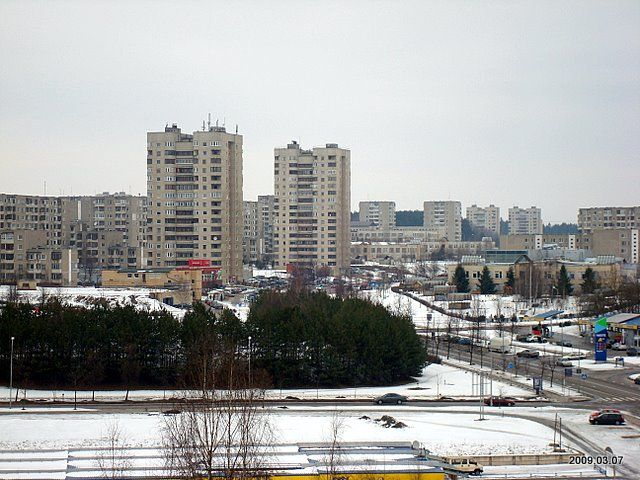
The Soviet-era district of Fabijoniškės in Vilnius, Lithuania was used to portray Pripyat.

In April 2018, principal photography began in Lithuania. Initial filming started on May 13, 2018, in Fabijoniškės, a residential district in Vilnius, Lithuania, which was used to portray the Ukrainian city of Pripyat, since the district maintained an authentic Soviet atmosphere. An area of densely built panel housing apartments served as a location for the evacuation scenes. Director Johan Renck heavily criticised the amount of diverse and eye-catching modern windows in the houses, but was not concerned about removing them in post-production.

At the end of March, production moved to Visaginas, Lithuania, to shoot both the exterior and interior of the Ignalina Nuclear Power Plant, a decommissioned nuclear power station that is sometimes referred to as "Chernobyl's sister" due to its visual resemblance and the nuclear reactor design used at both Chernobyl and Ignalina, both being RBMK nuclear power reactors. In early June 2018, production moved to Ukraine to shoot minor final scenes. The filming of Chernobyl took 16 weeks. The series has a reported production budget of $40 million, as part of a $250 million deal between HBO and Sky. According to series cinematographer Jakob Ihre, various Soviet-era films–namely Andrei Rublev, Stalker and Come and See–inspired the look of the miniseries.

=== Music ===
The musical score was composed by Icelandic composer Hildur Guðnadóttir. In August 2018, she began recording the score with Chris Watson at the Ignalina Nuclear Power Plant, where the series was being preliminarily shot. She used the recordings from the power plant, deciding not to depend on instruments and pre-recorded material to create the score, as she wanted to experience from a listener's perspective on what it is like to actually be inside of a power plant. The original score album was released by the record labels Deutsche Grammophon and WaterTower Music on May 31, 2019, with a vinyl edition released by Decca Records on September 6, 2019.

== Historical accuracy ==
The series was praised in the media for being exhaustively researched, but some commentators noted inaccuracies or liberties were taken for dramatic purposes, such as Legasov being present at the trial. The first episode depicts Legasov timing his suicide down to the second (1:23:45) to coincide with the second anniversary of the Chernobyl explosion. Legasov actually died by suicide a day later. The epilogue acknowledges that the character of Ulana Khomyuk is fictional, a composite of Soviet scientists. Journalist Adam Higginbotham, who spent a decade researching the disaster and authored the non-fiction account Midnight in Chernobyl, points out in an interview that there was no need for scientists to "uncover the truth" because "many nuclear scientists knew all along that there were problems with this reactor—the problems that led ultimately to an explosion and disaster". Artistic license was also used in the depiction of the "Bridge of Death", from which spectators in Pripyat watched the aftermath of the explosion. The miniseries suggests that the spectators subsequently died, and depicts them with radiation burns, a claim which is now generally held to be an urban legend.

The series also discusses a potential third steam explosion, due to the risk of corium melting through to the water reservoirs below the reactor building, as being in the range of two to four megatons. This would have been physically impossible under the circumstances, as exploding reactors do not function as thermonuclear bombs. According to series author Craig Mazin, the claim was based on one made by Belarusian nuclear physicist Vassili Nesterenko about a potential 3–5 Mt third explosion, even though physicists hired for the show were unable to confirm its plausibility.

The series' production design, such as the choice of sets, props, and costumes, has received high praise for its precise accuracy. Several sources have commended the attention to even minor setting details, such as the use of actual Kyiv-region license plate numbers, and a New Yorker review states that "the material culture of the Soviet Union is reproduced with an accuracy that has never before been seen" from either Western or Russian filmmakers. Oleksiy Breus, a Chernobyl engineer, commends the portrayal of the symptoms of radiation poisoning; Robert Gale, a doctor who treated Chernobyl victims, states that the miniseries overstated the symptoms by suggesting that the patients were radioactive. In a more critical judgment, a review from the Moscow Times highlights some small design errors: for instance, Soviet soldiers are inaccurately shown as holding their weapons in Western style and Legasov's apartment was too "dingy" for a scientist of his status.

In a 1996 interview, Lyudmilla Ignatenko said that her baby "took the whole radioactive shock [...] She was like a lightning rod for it". This perception that her husband, Vasily, was radioactive and caused the death of her daughter soon after birth was recreated in the miniseries. However, Ukrainian medical responder Alla Shapiro, in a 2019 interview with Vanity Fair, said such beliefs were false, and that once Ignatenko was showered and out of his contaminated clothing, he would not have been dangerous to others, precluding this possibility.

During an interview with BBC News Russian in 2019, Lyudmilla Ignatenko described how she suffered harassment and criticism when the series was aired. She said reporters hounded her at home in Kyiv and even jammed their feet in her door as they tried to interview her, and that she suffered criticism for exposing her unborn daughter to Vasily, despite the fact she hadn't known anything about radiation then and that risk to a fetus from such exposure is infinitesimally small. She said she never gave HBO and Sky Atlantic permission to tell her story, saying there had been a single phone call offering money after filming had been completed. She thought the call was a hoax because it came from a Moscow number and hung up. HBO Sky rejects this, saying they had exchanges with Lyudmilla before, during and after filming with the opportunity to participate and provide feedback and at no time did she express a wish for her story to not be included.

The portrayal of Soviet officials, including the plant management and central government figures, received some criticism. Breus, the Chernobyl engineer, argues that the characters of Viktor Bryukhanov, Nikolai Fomin and Anatoly Dyatlov were "distorted and misrepresented, as if they were villains". Some reviews criticized the series for creating a stark moral dichotomy, in which the scientists are depicted as overly heroic while the government and plant officials are uniformly villainous. The occasional threats of execution from government officials were also seen by some as anachronistic: Russian-American journalist Masha Gessen argues that "summary executions, or even delayed executions on orders of a single apparatchik, were not a feature of Soviet life after the nineteen-thirties". Higginbotham takes a more positive view of the portrayal of the authorities, arguing that the unconcerned attitude of the central government was accurately depicted.

== Release ==
The miniseries premiered on May 6, 2019, on HBO. In the United Kingdom and Republic of Ireland, it premiered on May 7, 2019, on Sky Atlantic.

=== Home media ===
The miniseries was released on Blu-ray and DVD on October 1, 2019. A 4K Ultra HD Blu-ray was released on December 1, 2020.

== Reception ==
=== Critical response ===
Chernobyl received widespread critical acclaim. On review aggregator Rotten Tomatoes, the series has an approval rating of 95% based on 103 reviews, with an average rating of 8.9/10. The website's critics consensus reads: "Chernobyl rivets with a creeping dread that never dissipates, dramatizing a national tragedy with sterling craft and an intelligent dissection of institutional rot." On Metacritic, it has a weighted average score of 82 out of 100, based on 27 critics, indicating "universal acclaim".

Reviewers for The Atlantic, The Washington Post, and the BBC observed parallels to contemporary society by focusing on the power of information and how dishonest leaders can make mistakes beyond their comprehension. Sophie Gilbert of The Atlantic hailed the series as a "grim disquisition on the toll of devaluing the truth"; Hank Stuever of The Washington Post praised it for showcasing "what happens when lying is standard and authority is abused". Meera Syal praised Chernobyl as a "fiercely intelligent exposition of the human cost of state censorship. Would love to see similar exposé of the Bhopal disaster". David Morrison was "struck by the attention to accuracy" and says the "series does an outstanding job of presenting the technical and human issues of the accident."

Jennifer K. Crosby, writing for The Objective Standard, says that the miniseries "explores the reasons for this monumental catastrophe and illustrates how it was magnified by the evasion and denial of those in charge," adding that "although the true toll of the disaster on millions of lives will never be known, Chernobyl goes a long way toward helping us understand [its] real causes and effects." In a negative article titled "Chernobyl: The Show Russiagate Wrote," Aaron Giovannone of the American left-wing publication Jacobin wrote that "even as we worry about the ongoing ecological crisis caused by capitalism, Chernobyl revels in the failure of the historical alternative to capitalism, which reinforces the status quo, offering us no way out of the crisis."

==== Russian, Belarusian and Ukrainian response ====
The miniseries was well received by some critics and audiences in Russia. Vladimir Medinsky, Russian culture minister, whose father was one of the Chernobyl liquidators, called the series "masterfully made" and "filmed with great respect for ordinary people". It was reported that Russian state-run NTV television channel has been producing its own "patriotic" version of the Chernobyl story in which the CIA plays a key role in the disaster. The Russians then claimed that the series in question had been in production since before HBO's miniseries and was not created in response to it. An apparent trailer for the series was uploaded to YouTube but was later deleted following negative reaction from the Russian viewers.

In a statement, Sergey Malinkovich, the head of the executive committee of the central committee of the Communists of Russia party, called for a criminal libel lawsuit to be brought under the Criminal Code of Russia against Chernobyl's writer, director and producers, describing the show as "disgusting". He also demanded that Russia's Federal Service for Supervision of Communications, Information Technology and Mass Media (Roskomnadzor) block access to the "filthy" miniseries. Marianna Prysiazhniuk of Vice Media noted that multiple Russian media outlets describe the miniseries as one-sided, incomplete, or anti-Russian propaganda. Argumenty i Fakty dismissed the show as "a caricature and not the truth" and "The only things missing are the bears and accordions!" said Stanislav Natanzon, lead anchor of Russia-24, one of the country's main state-run news channels.

In Ukraine, Anna Korolevska, deputy director at the Ukrainian National Chernobyl Museum in Kyiv, said "Today young people coming to power in Ukraine know nothing about that disaster in 1986. It was a necessary film to make and HBO have obviously tried their best; as for us, we are going to create a special tour about Chernobyl's historic truth, inspired by the HBO series." Bermet Talant, a Kyrgyz journalist, noted that "In Russia, a state that still takes pride in the Soviet legacy, the series has faced criticism from the official media. Meanwhile, many in Ukraine appreciated the series for humanizing a tragic chapter in the country's history. [...] Ukrainian viewers also appreciated HBO's Chernobyl for praising the heroism and self-sacrifice of ordinary people."

Belarusian Nobel laureate Svetlana Alexievich, whose book inspired the series, said "We are now witnessing a new phenomenon that Belarusians, who suffered greatly and thought they knew a lot about the tragedy, have completely changed their perception about Chernobyl and are interpreting this tragedy in a whole new way. The authors accomplished this, even though they are from a completely different world – not from Belarus, not from our region." She also noted its popularity with young Belarusians.

==== Reception in China ====
At the onset of the COVID-19 pandemic in China, Chinese netizens drew parallels between the Soviet response to the Chernobyl disaster and the initial handling of the coronavirus outbreak by the Chinese government. As a response, the page for Chernobyl on Douban, which by that point had amassed more than 200,000 ratings with an average of 9.6 out of 10, was taken down.

=== US ratings ===
Viewership and ratings per episode of Chernobyl
No.	Title	Air date	Rating (18–49)	Viewers (millions)	DVR (18–49)	DVR viewers (millions)	Total (18–49)	Total viewers (millions)
1	"1:23:45"	May 6, 2019	0.2	0.756	—N/a	—N/a	—N/a	—N/a
2	"Please Remain Calm"	May 13, 2019	0.3	1.004	0.2	0.716	0.5	1.721
3	"Open Wide, O Earth"	May 20, 2019	0.3	1.063	0.2	0.727	0.5	1.791
4	"The Happiness of All Mankind"	May 27, 2019	0.3	1.193	0.3	0.809	0.6	2.003
5	"Vichnaya Pamyat"	June 3, 2019	0.3	1.089	0.3	0.974	0.6	2.064

=== Awards and nominations ===
Award	Category	Nominee(s)	Result	Ref.
American Cinema Editors	Best Edited Miniseries or Motion Picture for Television	Jinx Godfrey and Simon Smith (for "Vichnaya Pamyat")	Won	
American Film Institute Awards	Television Programs of the Year	Chernobyl	Won	
Art Directors Guild Awards	Television Movie or Limited Series	Luke Hull	Won	
Association of Motion Picture Sound Awards	Excellence in sound for a Television Drama	Chernobyl	Won	
Banff Rockie Award	Limited series	Chernobyl	Won	
Blogos de Oro	Mejor Serie	Chernobyl	Won	
Blogos de Oro	Mejor Actor en una serie	Jared Harris	Won	
Blogos de Oro	Mejor Actor en una serie	Stellan Skarsgård	Nominated	
British Academy Scotland Awards	Best Actor in Television	Alex Ferns	Won	
British Academy Television Awards	Best Mini-Series	Chernobyl	Won	
British Academy Television Awards	Best Leading Actor	Jared Harris	Won	
British Academy Television Awards	Best Supporting Actor	Stellan Skarsgård	Nominated	
British Academy Television Craft Awards	Best Director: Fiction	Johan Renck	Won	
British Academy Television Craft Awards	Best Writer: Drama	Craig Mazin	Nominated	
British Academy Television Craft Awards	Best Editing: Fiction	Simon Smith and Jinx Godfrey	Won	
British Academy Television Craft Awards	Best Costume Design	Odile Dicks-Mireaux	Won	
British Academy Television Craft Awards	Best Make Up & Hair Design	Daniel Parker and Barrie Gower	Nominated	
British Academy Television Craft Awards	Best Original Music	Hildur Guðnadóttir	Won	
British Academy Television Craft Awards	Best Photography & Lighting: Fiction	Jakob Ihre	Won	
British Academy Television Craft Awards	Best Production Design	Luke Hull and Claire Levinson-Gendler	Won	
British Academy Television Craft Awards	Best Scripted Casting	Nina Gold and Robert Sterne	Nominated	
British Academy Television Craft Awards	Best Sound: Fiction	Stefan Henrix, Joe Beal, Stuart Hilliker and Vincent Piponnie	Won	
British Academy Television Craft Awards	Best Special, Visual & Graphic Effects	Lindsay Mcfarlane, Claudius Christian Rauch and Jean-Clément Soret	Nominated	
British Film Designers Guild Awards	International TV Drama including Mini Series, TV Movie or Limited Series	Luke Hull, Karen Wakefield and Claire Levinson-Gendler	Won	
British Society of Cinematographers Awards	Best Cinematography in a Television Drama	Jakob Ihre	Won	
Broadcast Tech Innovation Award	Best VFX Project	Max Dennison and Clare Cheetham	Won	
Broadcast Tech Innovation Award	Excellence in Grading (scripted)	Chernobyl	Won	
Broadcasting Press Guild Awards	Best Drama Series	Chernobyl	Won	
Broadcasting Press Guild Awards	Best Actor	Jared Harris	Nominated	
Broadcasting Press Guild Awards	Best Actress	Emily Watson	Nominated	
Broadcasting Press Guild Awards	Best Writer	Craig Mazin	Won	
Casting Society of America	Limited Series	Nina Gold and Robert Sterne	Nominated	
Cinema Audio Society Awards	Outstanding Achievement in Sound Mixing for Television Movie or Limited Series	Vincent Piponnier, Stuart Hilliker, Gibran Farrah and Philip Clements	Won	
Clio Awards	Trailer 1 – Gold Winner	Chernobyl	Won	
Clio Awards	Video Promo Mixed Campaign – Gold Winner	Chernobyl	Won	
Costume Designers Guild Awards	Excellence in Period Television	Odile Dicks-Mireaux (for "Please Remain Calm")	Nominated	
Critics' Choice Television Awards	Best Limited Series	Chernobyl	Nominated	
Critics' Choice Television Awards	Best Actor in a Limited Series or Television Movie	Jared Harris	Nominated	
Critics' Choice Television Awards	Best Supporting Actor in a Limited Series or Television Movie	Stellan Skarsgård	Won	
Critics' Choice Television Awards	Best Supporting Actress in a Limited Series or Television Movie	Emily Watson	Nominated	
Directors Guild of America Awards	Outstanding Directing – Movies for Television and Limited Series	Johan Renck	Won	
Dorian Awards	TV Drama of the Year	Chernobyl	Nominated	
Edinburgh TV Awards	Best Drama	Chernobyl	Won	
Edinburgh TV Awards	Best TV Actor	Jared Harris	Nominated	
Edinburgh TV Awards	Best TV Actor	Emily Watson	Nominated	
Edinburgh TV Awards	Best TV Actor	Jessie Buckley	Nominated	
Festival Nazionale del Doppiaggio Voci nell'Ombra	TV – Miglior doppiaggio generale	Chernobyl	Nominated	
Golden Globe Awards	Best Limited Series or Television Film	Chernobyl	Won	
Golden Globe Awards	Best Actor – Limited Series or Television Film	Jared Harris	Nominated	
Golden Globe Awards	Best Supporting Actor – Series, Limited Series or Television Film	Stellan Skarsgård	Won	
Golden Globe Awards	Best Supporting Actress – Series, Limited Series or Television Film	Emily Watson	Nominated	
Golden Reel Awards	Outstanding Achievement in Sound Editing – Dialogue and ADR for Episodic Long Form Broadcast Media	Stefan Henrix, Harry Barnes, Michael Maroussas	Won	
Golden Reel Awards	Outstanding Achievement in Sound Editing – Sound Effects and Foley for Episodic Long Form Broadcast Media	Stefan Henrix, Joe Beal, Philip Clements, Tom Stewart, Anna Wright	Won	
Golden Tomato Awards	Best-reviewed Miniseries and Limited Series	Chernobyl	Won	
Golden Trailer Awards	Best Horror/Thriller (TV Spot/Trailer/Teaser for a Series)	Chernobyl	Won	
Gotham Awards	Breakthrough Series – Long Form	Chernobyl	Nominated	
Grammy Awards	Best Score Soundtrack for Visual Media	Hildur Guðnadóttir	Won	
Hollywood Music in Media Awards	Best Original Score – TV Show/Limited Series	Hildur Guðnadóttir	Nominated	
Hollywood Post Alliance	Outstanding Editing – Television (Over 30 Minutes)	Simon Smith and Jinx Godfrey // Sister Pictures	Nominated	
Hollywood Post Alliance	Outstanding Sound – Television	Stefan Henrix, Stuart Hilliker, Joe Beal, Michael Maroussas and Harry Barnes // Boom Post	Nominated	
Hollywood Post Alliance	Outstanding Visual Effects – Television (Under 13 Episodes)	Lindsay McFarlane, Max Dennison, Clare Cheetham, Steven Godfrey and Luke Letkey // DNEG	Nominated	
Humanitas Prize	Limited Series, TV Movie or Special Category	Craig Mazin (for "Vichnaya Pamyat")	Nominated	
IGN People's Choice Awards	Best TV series	Chernobyl	Won	
IGN People's Choice Awards	Best drama TV series	Chernobyl	Won	
IGN People's Choice Awards	Best dramatic TV performance	Jared Harris	Won	
IGN People's Choice Awards	Best TV episode	"The Happiness of All Mankind"	Won	
International Film Music Critics Association	Best Original Score for Television	Hildur Guðnadóttir	Won	
Irish Film & Television Academy Awards	Actor in a Supporting Role in Drama	Barry Keoghan	Nominated	
Irish Film & Television Academy Awards	Actress in a Supporting Role in Drama	Jessie Buckley	Won	
Location Managers Guild Awards	Outstanding Locations in Period Television	Jonas Spokas	Won	
Make-Up Artists and Hair Stylists Guilds	Television Series, Mini-Series or New Media – Best Period and/or Character Make-Up	Daniel Parker and Natasha Nikolic-Dunlop	Nominated	
Make-Up Artists and Hair Stylists Guilds	Television Series, Mini-Series or New Media – Best Special Make-Up Effects	Daniel Parker, Barrie Gower and Paul Spateri	Won	
Make-Up Artists and Hair Stylists Guilds	Television Series, Mini-Series or New Media – Best Period and/or Character Hair Styling	Daniel Parker, Julio Parodi and Bozena Maisejenko	Nominated	
Music + Sound Awards	Best Sound Design in a Television Programme	Chernobyl	Won	
National Television Awards	New Drama	Chernobyl	Won	
Peabody Awards	Entertainment	Chernobyl	Won	
Primetime Emmy Awards	Outstanding Limited Series	Craig Mazin, Carolyn Strauss, Jane Featherstone, Johan Renck, Chris Fry and Sanne Wohlenberg	Won	
Primetime Emmy Awards	Outstanding Lead Actor in a Limited Series or Movie	Jared Harris	Nominated	
Primetime Emmy Awards	Outstanding Supporting Actor in a Limited Series or Movie	Stellan Skarsgård (for "Please Remain Calm")	Nominated	
Primetime Emmy Awards	Outstanding Supporting Actress in a Limited Series or Movie	Emily Watson (for "Open Wide, O Earth")	Nominated	
Primetime Emmy Awards	Outstanding Directing for a Limited Series, Movie, or Dramatic Special	Johan Renck	Won	
Primetime Emmy Awards	Outstanding Writing for a Limited Series, Movie, or Dramatic Special	Craig Mazin	Won	
Primetime Creative Arts Emmy Awards	Outstanding Casting for a Limited Series, Movie, or Special	Nina Gold and Robert Sterne	Nominated	
Primetime Creative Arts Emmy Awards	Outstanding Cinematography for a Limited Series or Movie	Jakob Ihre (for "Please Remain Calm")	Won	
Primetime Creative Arts Emmy Awards	Outstanding Period Costumes	Odile Dicks-Mireaux, Holly McLean, Daiva Petrulyte, Anna Munro and Sylvie Org (for "Please Remain Calm")	Nominated	
Primetime Creative Arts Emmy Awards	Outstanding Hairstyling for a Limited Series or Movie	Julio Parodi and Jovana Jovanavic	Nominated	
Primetime Creative Arts Emmy Awards	Outstanding Make-up for a Limited Series or Movie (Non-Prosthetic)	Daniel Parker and Natasha Nikolic-Dunlop	Nominated	
Primetime Creative Arts Emmy Awards	Outstanding Prosthetic Makeup for a Series, Limited Series, Movie or Special	Barrie Gower, Paul Spateri and Daniel Parker	Nominated	
Primetime Creative Arts Emmy Awards	Outstanding Music Composition for a Limited Series, Movie, or Special (Original Dramatic Score)	Hildur Guðnadóttir (for "Please Remain Calm")	Won	
Primetime Creative Arts Emmy Awards	Outstanding Production Design for a Narrative Period or Fantasy Program (One Hour or More)	Luke Hull, Karen Wakefield and Claire Levinson-Gendler	Won	
Primetime Creative Arts Emmy Awards	Outstanding Single-Camera Picture Editing for a Limited Series or Movie	Jinx Godfrey (for "Open Wide, O Earth")	Nominated	
Primetime Creative Arts Emmy Awards	Outstanding Single-Camera Picture Editing for a Limited Series or Movie	Simon Smith (for "Please Remain Calm")	Won	
Primetime Creative Arts Emmy Awards	Outstanding Sound Editing for a Limited Series, Movie, or Special	Stefan Henrix, Joe Beal, Michael Maroussas, Harry Barnes, Andy Wade, Anna Wright (for "1:23:45")	Won	
Primetime Creative Arts Emmy Awards	Outstanding Sound Mixing for a Limited Series or Movie	Stuart Hilliker and Vincent Piponnier (for "1:23:45")	Won	
Primetime Creative Arts Emmy Awards	Outstanding Special Visual Effects in a Supporting Role	Max Dennison, Lindsay McFarlane, Claudius Christian Rauch, Clare Cheetham, Laura Bethencourt Montes, Steven Godfrey, Luke Letkey, Christian Waite and William Foulser (for "1:23:45")	Won	
Producers Guild of America Awards	Outstanding Producer of Limited Series Television	Craig Mazin, Carolyn Strauss, Jane Featherstone, Johan Renck, Chris Fry and Sanne Wohlenberg	Won	
Rose d'Or	Golden Rose	Chernobyl	Won	
Rose d'Or	Drama	Chernobyl	Won	
Royal Television Society Awards	Mini-Series	Chernobyl	Nominated	
Royal Television Society Awards	Actor (Male)	Jared Harris	Nominated	
Royal Television Society Awards	Writer (Drama)	Craig Mazin	Won	
Royal Television Society Craft & Design Awards	Director – Drama	Johan Renck	Nominated	
Royal Television Society Craft & Design Awards	Music – Original Score	Hildur Guðnadóttir	Won	
Royal Television Society Craft & Design Awards	Costume Design – Drama	Odile Dicks-Mireaux	Won	
Royal Television Society Craft & Design Awards	Make Up Design – Drama	Daniel Parker	Won	
Royal Television Society Craft & Design Awards	Photography – Drama & Comedy	Jakob Ihre	Won	
Royal Television Society Craft & Design Awards	Production Design – Drama	Luke Hull, Clare Levinson-Gendler	Won	
Royal Television Society Craft & Design Awards	Sound – Drama	Stefan Henrix, Stuart Hilliker, Joe Beal, Harry Barnes, Michael Maroussas	Won	
Satellite Awards	Best Miniseries	Chernobyl	Won	
Satellite Awards	Best Actor – Miniseries or TV Film	Jared Harris	Won	
Satellite Awards	Best Supporting Actor – Series, Miniseries or TV Film	Stellan Skarsgård	Nominated	
Satellite Awards	Best Supporting Actress – Series, Miniseries or TV Film	Emily Watson	Nominated	
Screen Actors Guild Awards	Outstanding Performance by a Male Actor in a Miniseries or Television Movie	Jared Harris	Nominated	
Screen Actors Guild Awards	Outstanding Performance by a Female Actor in a Miniseries or Television Movie	Emily Watson	Nominated	
Sentinel Awards	Topic: Nuclear safety	Chernobyl	Won	
Society of Composers & Lyricists Awards	Outstanding Original Score for a Television or Streaming Production	Hildur Guðnadóttir	Won	
Television Critics Association Awards	Program of the Year	Chernobyl	Nominated	
Television Critics Association Awards	Outstanding Achievement in Movies, Miniseries and Specials	Chernobyl	Won	
Televisual Bulldog Awards	Best Drama One-off or Serial	Chernobyl	Won	
Televisual Bulldog Awards	Best Cinematography	Chernobyl	Won	
Televisual Bulldog Awards	Best Music	Chernobyl	Won	
Televisual Bulldog Awards	Best VFX	Chernobyl	Won	
Venice TV Awards	Best TV Series	Chernobyl	Won	
Visual Effects Society Awards	Outstanding Supporting Visual Effects in a Photoreal Episode	Max Dennison, Lindsay McFarlane, Clare Cheetham, Paul Jones and Claudius Christian Rauch (for "1:23:45")	Won	
World Soundtrack Awards	Television Composer of the Year	Hildur Guðnadóttir	Won	
Writers Guild of America Awards	Long Form – Original	Craig Mazin	Won	

== See also ==
- List of Chernobyl-related articles
- List of Primetime Emmy Awards received by HBO
- Nuclear and radiation accidents and incidents
- Radiation protection
- Signs and symptoms of radiation poisoning
