= Nikolai Tarakanov =

Soviet military officer

- Native name: Николай Тараканов
- Born: 19 May 1934 (age 92); Gremyachye, Central Black Earth Oblast, Russian SFSR, Soviet Union
- Allegiance: Soviet Union
- Branch: Infantry
- Service years: 1953–1990
- Rank: Major general

Nikolai Dmitrievich Tarakanov (Russian: Николай Дмитриевич Тараканов; born 19 May 1934) is a former Soviet military leader, doctor of technical sciences, member of the Presidium of the Russian Academy of Natural Sciences, founder and chairman of the Coordination Council of the Presidential Club Trust, Center for Social Protection of Persons with Disabilities, a member of the Union of Russian Writers, laureate of the M.A. Sholokhov International Literary Prize.

Tarakanov led a three-month operation to remove radioactive debris from the dangerous zones of the Chernobyl Nuclear Power Plant, as well as the restoration work after the Spitak earthquake. In his later life, he has become disabled due to consequences of his exposure to radiation in Chernobyl, and currently takes eight different medications to treat his radiation-related symptoms.

== Early life and education ==
Tarakanov was born in the village of Gremyachye (now - Khokholsky District, Voronezh Oblast) to a large peasant family. His father was Dmitry Tikhonovich Tarakanov, a veteran of the Russian Civil War, Winter War and World War II, and his mother was Natalia Vasilyevna.

In 1953, he graduated from the Gremyachensk secondary school, then Kharkov Military Technical School. He served in the school, later in the Red Banner regiment of civil defense troops (the city of Meref) as commander of an electrical platoon.

In 1963, he graduated from the Kharkov Automobile and Highway Institute with a degree in mechanical engineering. He served in Saratov as a regimental engineer. In 1967, he became a teacher at the Moscow Military School of Civil Defense. In 1972, he graduated from the adjuncture of the Kuibyshev Military Engineering Academy in Moscow.

== Career ==
Tarakanov served as a senior specialist in the Military Technical Committee of the USSR Civil Defense Forces, then in the All-Union Scientific Research Institute of Civil Defense (including as First Deputy Chief of the institute), Deputy Chief of the Civil Defense Staff of the RSFSR.

In 1986, he led an operation to remove highly radioactive elements from dangerous zones of the Chernobyl nuclear power plant.

For me and for my soldiers, until my death, the Chernobyl disaster will be one of the most tragic events in my 37-year service. I got there in the month of June 1986, when there was still complete confusion after the largest catastrophe on our planet.

— N. D. Tarakanov

In 1988, he led the rescue work after the Spitak earthquake.

Spitak turned out to be much more terrible than Chernobyl! In Chernobyl, you grabbed your dose and be healthy, because the radiation is the enemy of invisibility.

And here – torn bodies, groans under the ruins ... Therefore, our main task was not only to help and pull out the living from the rubble, but also to bury the dead. We photographed and recorded in the staff album all unidentified corpses and buried them with numbers.

When the people affected by the earthquake returned from hospitals, they began to look for their dead relatives and turned to us. We provided pictures for identification. Then we exhumed the identified ones from the graves and buried them in a human way, in a Christian manner. This went on for six months ...

At the end of last year, when it was ten years since the tragedy, we visited Spitak and looked at its current miserable condition. Armenians understand that with the collapse of the Soviet Union, they lost more than anyone else. Overnight, the program to restore the destroyed Spitak, Leninakan, Akhuryan region collapsed. Now they are finishing rebuilding what Russia and the other republics of the USSR were rebuilding.

— N. D. Tarakanov

In June 2019, in an interview with TV Rain channel, discussing the HBO serial Chernobyl, he said that he had lost the savings that he had saved for treatment.

And yet I had to fight. Here I have a telegram to him, I am this year ... Constantly with radiation sickness, I was lying in army hospitals, now in the hospital of the presidential administration. And once in this hospital they say: "General, we cannot restore the mobility of the legs, no pain in the joints, and so on." I was in Israel, I was treated once, Gazprom paid for my trip and fifteen soldiers.

And by my naivety, as we are all naive, I placed my savings and all the retirement pensions of the generals in the Moscow City Cash Desk, in the savings bank. She worked for six years. I learned everything that a normal box office and so on. And now I’m calling from the Kremlin hospital, which means Popov, the director at 10 Novaya Square. I say: “You make money for me, I received consent again to Israel. I am not asking for money from Putin or from the state, just let them give me the money.” "Come, General, good."

I come a week later, while I was discharged, while that-that. I come, he says: “You know, the Central Bank has selected a license from us. We can't give you money.” Then I’m writing one telegram to Putin, the second, the third. What do you think? I think, of course, if these telegrams were laid on his desk, of course, he would have made a decision. But these telegrams fell to this man, Dozorov.

— TV channel "Rain"

According to Tarakanov, for his leadership of the operation on the Chernobyl accident, he was presented to the title of Hero of the Soviet Union. The general said this in an interview with journalist Alexey Pivovarov. But after, as Tarakanov says, the conflict with the chief of staff of the Kiev military district, General Fedorov, he was removed from the list.

=== Family ===
Tarakanov married Zoya Ivanovna, a doctor. They had a daughter, Yelena, who became a doctor.

== Awards ==
- Jubilee Medal "In Commemoration of the 100th Anniversary of the Birth of Vladimir Ilyich Lenin"
- Order "For Service to the Homeland in the Armed Forces of the USSR" III degree (1975), II degree (1987)
- Order of the Red Star (1982)
- Order of the Badge of Honour (1988)
- Order of Friendship (1995)
- Medal "Veteran of the Armed Forces of the USSR"
- Jubilee medals "40 Years of the Armed Forces of the USSR", "50 Years of the Armed Forces of the USSR", "60 Years of the Armed Forces of the USSR", "70 Years of the Armed Forces of the USSR", "60 Years of Victory in the Great Patriotic War 1941–1945", "65 Years of Victory in the Great Patriotic War 1941–1945", 150 Years of Railway Troops of Russia
- Medal "For Impeccable Service" 1, 2 and 3 degrees
- Medal "75 Years of Civil Defense"

=== Public awards ===
- Order "For the Salvation of Life on Earth" (on the green ribbon)
- Order "Pride of Russia" (on a red ribbon)
- Order "For Service to the Fatherland" III and I degree (on tape)
- Order of "Civil Valor"
- Order "Defenders of the Fatherland" (white)
- Freeman (Order of the silver star "Public recognition")
- Order of Merit (Order of the Minister of Emergency Situations Shoigu)
- The gold medal of the winner of the M.A. Sholokhov International Literary Prize
- Sergey Yesenin's gold medal
- Gold Medal "Honorary Lawyer"
- Gold Medal "Winner of the Chernobyl Star Literary Award"

Medals For Loyalty to the Fatherland, Peacemaker, Russian Land, Medal Bunin, Silver Medal of the Russian Academy of Natural Sciences, For merits in the revival of the nation to them. Peter the Great, 20 years of the Chernobyl disaster, For loyalty to duty, For merits in the field of veterinary medicine, George Zhukov, 55 years of the Moscow city writers' organization, Afghanistan 40th Army, Medal. Roentgen (Germany).

== In popular culture ==
In the HBO television series Chernobyl, Tarakanov is played by the English actor Ralph Ineson. Tarakanov praised the series, calling it “brilliant work”, and also spoke highly of the portrayal by the British actor who played him in the series.

Did you recognize the portrayal of yourself?

Yes, I watched it. The actor Ralph played, I will tell you, brilliantly. Not everything, not from the beginning to the end, but the most important moments of leading the operation by the general at Chernobyl, the removal of nuclear fuel, graphite, and so on — this was very brilliantly shown.

— TV Rain

== Publications ==
Source – NNB Electronic Catalogs

=== Scientific articles ===
- Maksimov, M. T., Tarakanov, N. D., Experience of Using Technical Means and Methods for Managing the Consequences of the Accident at the Chernobyl Nuclear Power Plant / Ed. ed. V.L. Govorova . - M.: stroiizdat, 1990. - 137 p.
- Tarakanov N. D. Complex mechanization of rescue and emergency rescue and recovery operations. - M.: Energoatomizdat, 1984. - 304 p. - (Civil Defense of the USSR).

=== Books ===
- Tarakanov N. D. Two tragedies of the XX century. [The explosion of the nuclei. reactor at Chernobyl. NPP and the Spitak earthquake]: Dokum. to lead - M.: Owls. writer, 1992. - 431 p. - ISBN 5-265-02615-0
- Tarakanov N. D. Living memory. reflections on time and on human destiny ... / comp. A. Pekarsky. - Ed. 2nd, add. [and pre.]. - M.: Voenizdat Branch, 2006. - 488 p. - ISBN 5-203-02811-2
- Tarakanov N. D. Notes of the Russian General. Fav. works: In 3 tons. - M.: 4th fil. Military Publishing, 1998.
  - Vol. 1: Hell's End
  - Vol. 2: Coffins on the shoulders
  - Vol. 3: The Abyss
- Tarakanov N. D. Notes of the Russian General. [selected works]. - M.: Branch of Voenizdat, 2007.
  - Vol. 1: Hell's End
  - Vol. 2: And the Earth opened up
  - Vol. 3: The Catcher in the Lie ...
- N. D. Tarakanov. And the two destinies became one fate ...: a literary collection of arts. - M.: Voenizdat branch, 2008. - 175 p. - ISBN 5-203-02753-X
- Tarakanov N. D. When the mountains cry. - M.: Dignity, 2014. - 294 p. - ISBN 978-5-904552-35-0
- Tarakanov N. D. Hope of Russia. - M.: B.i., 2004. - 472 p. - BBK Ш6 (2 = Р) 75–491
- Tarakanov N. D. Under the constellation of the Bull. Field. meditations. - M.: Inter-Libra, 2003. - 279 p. - ISBN 5-86490-093-14 (err.)
- N. D. Tarakanov. Break: [Earthquake in Armenia, 7 Dec. 1988]. - M.: Military Publishing, 1991. - 192 p. - ISBN 5-203-01243-1
- Tarakanov N. D. Russian knot. Prince thinking - 2nd ed., [Add.]. - M.: Military Publishing, 2002. - 615 p. - ISBN 5-86490-117-X
- Tarakanov N. D. Chernobyl notes, or Reflections on morality. - M.: Military Publishing, 1989. - 208 p. - ISBN 5-203-00716-0
- Tskhinval: a chronicle of Georgian aggression. documentary collection / under total. ed. N. D. Tarakanova. - Ed. 2nd, add. - M.: Presidential Club "Trust", 2009. - 272 p. - ISBN 5-203-02765-8
- "Chernobyl Signal"; "The dead judge the living"; "The dead are not silent"; “At the turn of the millennium. Fracture "; "Fracture"; "Graphite"; "Soldiers of the Fatherland"; “Vivat to President Putin!”; "President Putin in the new version"; "Sonkino Lake"

=== Television appearances ===
- Air Force TV program
- Chernobyl: Chronicle of Silence
- Good Morning (with Arina Sharapova, Larisa Verbitskaya)
- Evening Voronezh (1992)
- Go!, Klass! TV (commissioned by ORT, 1997)
- Hero of the Day with Svetlana Sorokina (NTV, 1998)
- Witness of the Century (NTV, 2000)
- Forgive with Andrey Rasbash (Channel One, 2005)
- Church and Peace (June 21, 2014)
- Male and Female (ORT - Channel 1, February 20, 2015)
