= Adrian Rawlins =

British actor (born 1958)

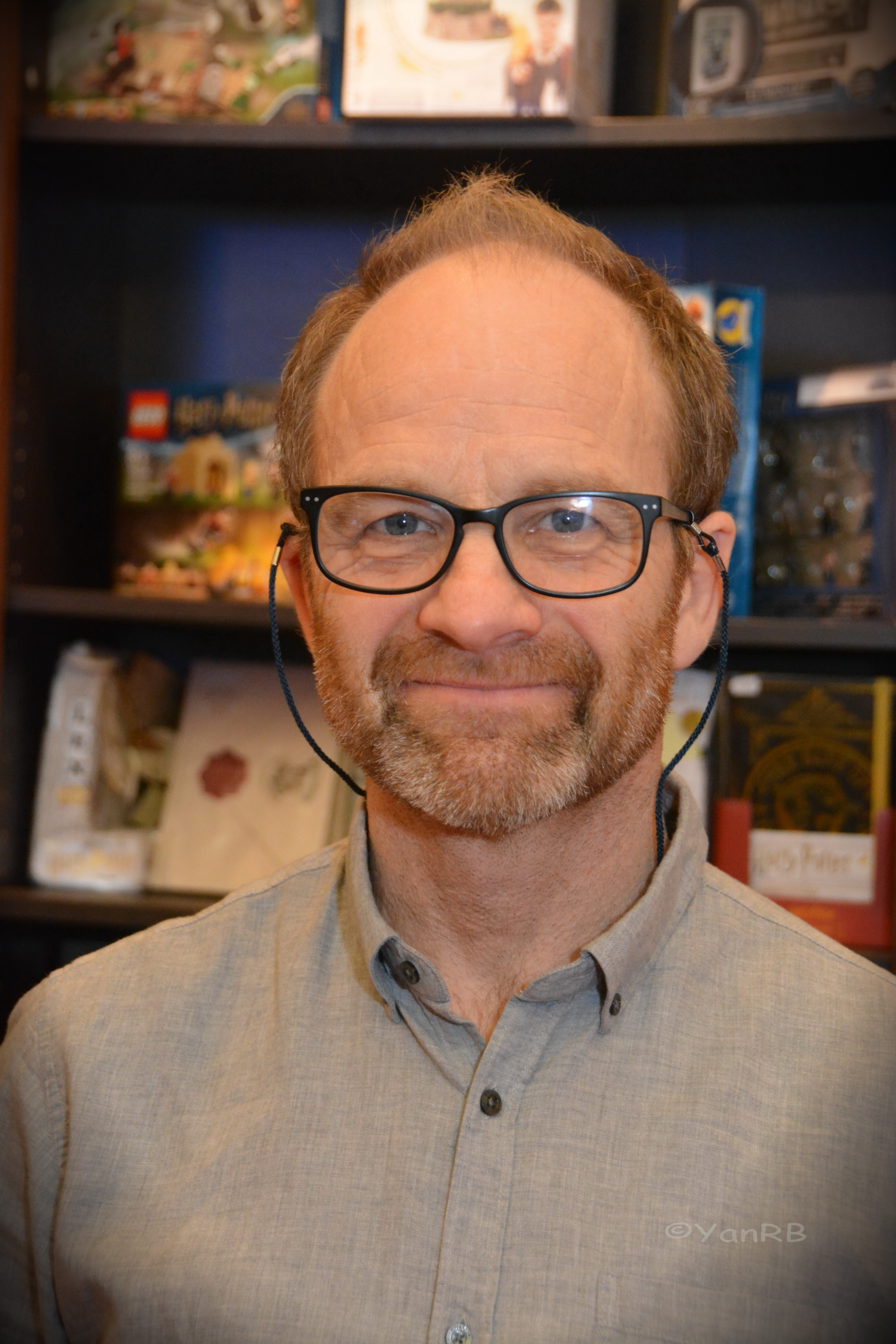
- Rawlins in 2019
- Born: Adrian John Rawlins; 27 March 1958 (age 68); Stoke-on-Trent, Staffordshire, England
- Education: Manchester Metropolitan University
- Occupation: Actor
- Years active: 1980–present

Adrian John Rawlins (born 27 March 1958) is an English actor best known for playing Arthur Kidd in The Woman in Black (1989) and James Potter in the Harry Potter films. In 2019, he starred in Chernobyl as Nikolai Fomin.

== Early life ==
Rawlins was born in Stoke-on-Trent, Staffordshire, the son of Mavis (née Leese) and Edward Rawlins, a market trader. Rawlins was educated at Stanfield Technical High School in Stoke-on-Trent and the Stoke VI Form College. He then studied art and acting at Manchester Metropolitan University.

== Career ==
Rawlins has appeared in over 30 films including Lars von Trier's Breaking the Waves and Wilbur Wants to Kill Himself. He has a pivotal role in the Harry Potter film series as Harry Potter's father James Potter. Onstage, he has appeared in Her Naked Skin (2008, National Theatre). He played Richard Collingsworth in the 1989 TV serial version of The Ginger Tree, opposite Samantha Bond. He also starred in The Woman in Black which was made for television and aired at Christmas 1989.

Since 2014, he has volunteered at East Riding Theatre in the East Riding of Yorkshire, becoming artistic director in 2017.

== Filmography ==
=== Film ===
Key
†	Denotes films that have not yet been released

Year	Title	Role	Notes
1980	Palm Beach	David Litvinoff	
1985	Revolution	Bill	
1987	With Love to the Person Next to Me	Man in Bed	
1988	Georgia		
1990	Mountains of the Moon	Edward	
1993	Flynn	Tailor	
1996	Different for Girls	Mike Rendell	
1996	Breaking the Waves	Dr. Richardson	
1996	The Inner Sanctuary	Owen	
2000	Blood	Carl Dyson	
2001	My Brother Tom	Jack	
2001	Harry Potter and the Philosopher's Stone	James Potter	
2002	Harry Potter and the Chamber of Secrets	James Potter	
2002	Wilbur Wants to Kill Himself	Harbour	
2004	Harry Potter and the Prisoner of Azkaban	James Potter	
2005	Harry Potter and the Goblet of Fire	James Potter	
2007	Harry Potter and the Order of the Phoenix	James Potter	
2009	Tales of the Fourth Dimension	William Shakespeare	Direct-to-video
2010	Harry Potter and the Deathly Hallows: Part 1	James Potter	
2011	Harry Potter and the Deathly Hallows: Part 2	James Potter	
2011	Intruders	Police Inspector	
2012	The Raven	Doc Clements	
2014	The Woman in Black: Angel of Death	Dr. Rhodes	
2015	Bridgend	Vicar	
2017	Darkest Hour	Air Chief Marshal Dowding	
2019	The Small Hand	Edward Merriman	
2020	Undergods	Dominic	
2021	Without Remorse	Chief of Staff	
2021	The Colour Room	John	
2022	Living	Middleton	
2023	One Life	Geoff	
2025	Rose of Nevada	Mr. Richards	
2026	The Brink of War	Max Kampelman	
2026	Merry Christmas Aubrey Flint	Albert	
TBA	The Return of Stanley Atwell †	TBA	Post-production

=== Television ===
Year	Title	Role	Notes
1985	I Live with Me Dad	Registrar	TV film
1986	The Kit Curran Radio Show	Nevin	Episode: "A Sick Society"
1986	Chance in a Million	PC Willis	Recurring role; 2 episodes
1988	Neighbours	Mr. Pike	Guest role; 1 episode
1988	Christabel	Albrecht	Miniseries
1988	The Four Minute Mile	Chris Chataway	TV film
1989	The Ginger Tree	Captain Richard Collingsworth	Miniseries
1989	The Woman in Black	Arthur Kidd	TV film
1991	4 Play	Martin	Episode: "Seduction"
1992	Casualty	Mark	Episode: "Body and Soul"
1992	Early Travellers in North America	Charles Dickens	Recurring role; 4 episodes
1992	Screen One	Michael Mitchum	Episode: "Running Late"
1993	The Bill	Bernard Holt	Episode: "Echo"
1993	Soldier Soldier	Major Tim Radley	Recurring role; 8 episodes
1994	Moving Story	Steven Elliot	Episode: "None Shall Sleep"
1995	Tears Before Bedtime	David Baylis	Recurring role; 4 episodes
1995	She's Out	DS Mike Withey	Series regular; 6 episodes
1996	The Bill	David Stone	Episode: "Hard Enough"
1996	The Man from Snowy River	Travelling Salesman	Episode: "Prince of Hearts"
1997	Insiders	Woody Pine	Series regular; 6 episodes
1998	Casualty	Richard Thomas	Episode: "Eye Spy"
1999	Forgotten	Oliver Fraser	Miniseries
1999	An Evil Streak	Christopher Clarkson	Miniseries
1999	Liverpool 1	Peter Kitchen	Episode: "King of the Castle"
2000	Sunburn	Ronnie Vaughn	Episode #2.4
2000	Dalziel and Pascoe	Henry Crayford	Episode: "Cunning Old Fox"
2000	Badger	Aidan Fletcher	Episode: "Troubled Waters"
2001	Midsomer Murders	Adam Keyne	Episode: "Tainted Fruit"
2001	Holby City	Chris Eastwood	Episode: "Night Shift"
2002	The Stretford Wives	Frank Foster	TV film
2003	Hear the Silence	Dr. Tony Danielson	TV film
2004	Dunkirk	Captain Bill Tennant	Miniseries
2004	Spooks	Andrew Forrestal	Episode: "Outsiders"
2005	I Shouldn't Be Alive	Karl	Episode: "Escape from the Amazon"
2005	Ahead of the Class	Tony Mackersie	TV film
2005	The Man-Eating Lions of Njombe	George Rushby	TV film
2005	Animals	Bob Thornwell	TV film
2006	The Inspector Lynley Mysteries	Tim Sumner	Episode: "Natural Causes"
2007	Silent Witness	Alan Eckhert	Episode: "Peripheral Vision"
2007	Lewis	Harry Bundrick	Episode: "Whom the Gods Would Destroy"
2007	Agatha Christie's Marple	Derek Turnbull	Episode: "Nemesis"
2007	New Tricks	Daniel Newley	Episode: "God's Waiting Room"
2007	The Whistleblowers	Derek Press	Episode: "Environment"
2007	Life Line	Jack	TV film
2007	Clapham Junction	Peter	TV film
2007	The Old Curiosity Shop	Jacob	TV film
2008	Trial & Retribution	Plaskett	Episode: "The Rules of the Game"
2008	10 Days to War	Paul Stinchcombe	Episode: "Failure Is Not an Option"
2008	Doctor Who	Dr. Ryder	Episode: "Planet of the Ood"
2008	Banged Up Abroad	John	Episode: "Nightmare in Chechnya"
2009	Hunter	John Elder	Miniseries
2010	Bouquet of Barbed Wire	Richard Goodfellow	Miniseries
2010	Misfits	Dave	Episode #2.5
2011	Midsomer Murders	David Orchard	Episode: "Echoes of the Dead"
2011	Strike Back: Project Dawn	John Allen	Recurring role; 2 episodes
2011	Law & Order: UK	Roland Hextor	Episode: "Dawn Till Dusk"
2012	Mrs Biggs	DI Williams	Miniseries
2012–2013	Prisoners' Wives	Ian	Series regular; 7 episodes
2013	Mayday	DS Mills	Miniseries
2013	By Any Means	Daniel Foster	Miniseries
2014	Silent Witness	DI John Leighton	Episode: "Commodity"
2014	Father Brown	Dr. Walter Henshaw	Episode: "The Maddest of All"
2014	Glue	DCI Simson	Series regular; 8 episodes
2015	From Darkness	Gareth Harding	Miniseries
2015–2016	Dickensian	Edward Barbary	Series regular; 14 episodes
2016	War & Peace	Platon Karataev	Miniseries
2017	Death in Paradise	Stephen Langham	Episode: "Erupting in Murder"
2017	The White Princess	John de la Pole	Series regular; 6 episodes
2017	Maigret	Oscar Bonvoisin	Episode: "Maigret in Montmartre"
2018	Hard Sun	DS George Mooney	Series regular; 6 episodes
2018	Innocent	Rob Moffatt	Miniseries
2018	Girlfriends	Dave	Series regular; 6 episodes
2019	Chernobyl	Nikolai Fomin	Miniseries
2019	Sanditon	Mr Heywood	Episode #1.1
2020	Trigonometry	Mick	Recurring role; 2 episodes
2020	Small Axe	Headmaster	Episode: "Education"
2021	A Discovery of Witches	William Cecil	Recurring role; 4 episodes
2021	Grace	Harry Frame	Recurring role; 2 episodes
2021	Baptiste	Richard Chambers	Recurring role; 2 episodes
2022	Gentleman Jack	Jonathan Gray	Episode: "It's Not Illegal"
2022	Slow Horses	Duncan Tropper	Recurring role; 4 episodes
2022	All Creatures Great and Small	Charles Harcourt	Recurring role; 2 episodes
2022	Andor	Doctor Rhasiv	Recurring role; 2 episodes
2023	The Sixth Commandment	Ian Farquhar	Recurring role; 4 episodes
2023	Vera	Daniel Rede	Episode: "The Rising Tide"
2024	Mary & George	Sir Edward Coke	Miniseries
2024	Moonflower Murders	Lawrence Treherne/Lance Gardner	Post-production
2025-2026	Patience	Douglas Gilmour	Recurring role
2025	Midsomer Murders	Reverend William Gideon	Episode: "Treasures of Darkness"
2026	Star City	Lev Burkov	Episode: "Plow Deep"

=== Video games ===
Year	Title	Role
2011	Harry Potter and the Deathly Hallows – Part 2	James Potter (voice)

== Theatre credits ==
Year	Title	Role	Venue	Notes
1984	Miss Julie	Jean		
1985	Time To Kill	Peter Wolfson	Swan Theatre, Worcester	
1986	The Freud Scenario	Student / Footman	Royal National Theatre, London	
1987	A View from the Bridge	Rodolpho	Cottesloe Theatre, London	
1987	A Small Family Business	Roy Ruston	Olivier Theatre, London	
1989	The Glass Menagerie	Jim O'Connor	Royal Exchange Theatre, Manchester	
1990	Three Sisters	Staff Captain Vassily Vasilyevich Solyony	Queen's Theatre, London	
1991	The Miser	Valère	Olivier Theatre, London	
1992	Hamlet	Laertes	Riverside Studios, London	
1993	The Clearing	Robert	Bush Theatre, London	
1995	Easter	Elis	Barbican Centre, London	
1997	The Herbal Bed	Rafe Smith	Duchess Theatre, London	
2000	The Maiden's Prayer	Taylor	Bush Theatre, London	
2002	Dinner	Hal	Royal National Theatre, London	
2005	The Lunatic Queen	Various roles	Riverside Studios, London	
2006	Clever Dick	Dick	Hampstead Theatre, London	
2008	Her Naked Skin	William Cain	Royal National Theatre, London	
2009	The House of Special Purpose	Nicolas Romanov	Minerva Theatre, Chichester	
2011	Good	John Halder	Royal Exchange Theatre, Manchester	
2013	The Herd	Ian	Bush Theatre, London	
2014	3 Winters	Vlado	Royal National Theatre, London	
2019	The Lady from the Sea	Doctor Edvard Wangel	The Print Room, London	

== Awards and nominations ==
Year	Award	Category	Work	Result
2003	British Independent Film Awards	Best Supporting Actor/Actress	Wilbur Wants to Kill Himself	Nominated
2003	Robert Awards	Best Actor in a Supporting Role	Wilbur Wants to Kill Himself	Nominated
2019	OFTA Television Awards	Best Ensemble in a Motion Picture of Limited Series (with Jessie Buckley, David Dencik, Robert Emms, Fares Fares, Alex Ferns, Jared Harris, Ralph Ineson, Mark Lewis Jones, Barry Keoghan, Michael McElhatton, Adam Nagaitis, Con O'Neill, Paul Ritter, Stellan Skarsgård, Sam Troughton & Alan Williams)	Chernobyl	Nominated
2020	CinEuphoria Awards	Honorary Award - Merit (with Jessie Buckley, David Dencik, Robert Emms, Fares Fares, Jane Featherstone, Alex Ferns, Chris Fry, Jared Harris, Ralph Ineson, Mark Lewis Jones, Barry Keoghan, Craig Mazin, Michael McElhatton, Adam Nagaitis, Con O'Neill, Johan Renck, Paul Ritter, Stellan Skarsgård, Carolyn Strauss, Sam Troughton, Alan Williams & Sanne Wohlenberg)	Chernobyl	Won
