= Viktor Bryukhanov =

Soviet director of the Chernobyl Nuclear Power Plant (1935–2021)

- Bryukhanov in 2001
- Born: Viktor Petrovich Bryukhanov; 1 December 1935; Tashkent, Uzbek SSR, Soviet Union
- Died: 13 October 2021 (aged 85); Kyiv, Ukraine
- Citizenship: USSR (until 1994); Ukraine
- Known for: Serving as director of the Chernobyl Nuclear Power Plant

Viktor Petrovich Bryukhanov (Ukrainian: Віктор Петрович Брюханов, Russian: Виктор Петрович Брюханов; 1 December 1935 – 13 October 2021) was the manager of construction of the Chernobyl Nuclear Power Plant and the director of the plant from 1970 to 1986.

== Biography ==
Bryukhanov was born on 1 December 1935 in the city of Tashkent, Uzbek SSR. He was the oldest son out of four children. His father used to work as a glazier and his mother was a cleaning lady. He later became the only one of his brothers to receive higher education attaining a degree from the Energy Department of the Tashkent Polytechnic in electrical engineering in 1959. After graduation, he was offered a job at Academy of Sciences of Uzbekistan.

In 1966, he was invited to work at the Slavyansk Thermal Power Plant. He started as a senior foreman and rose up to the rank of head of workshop and finally, deputy chief engineer, after which he resigned in 1970 to build a nuclear power plant in the Ukrainian SSR. He was a member of Communist Party of Soviet Union (CPSU) since 1966. Between 1970 and 1986, he was repeatedly elected member of the regional district office of Kiev, Chernobyl, and Pripyat city committees of the party.

Viktor met his wife Valentina at Angren Power Plant. Valentina was an assistant to a turbine engineer and Viktor was a trainee fresh from the university.

=== Chernobyl Power Plant construction ===
In 1971 the energy minister offered Bryukhanov a new assignment – build an atomic power plant consisting of four RBMK reactors on the banks of the Pripyat River in Ukraine. Initially, Bryukhanov proposed construction of pressurized water reactors (PWRs), but this decision was met with opposition stating safety and economic reasons supporting construction of RBMK reactors, which was eventually performed.

Bryukhanov presided over the response to fuel element damage at Reactor 1 on 9 September 1982, when contaminated steam was vented into the atmosphere. The radioactive contaminants had spread fourteen kilometers from the plant and reached Pripyat, but the authorities determined that the public should not be informed, and that decontamination was only necessary on the grounds of the plant itself.

==== Chernobyl disaster ====
On 26 April 1986, the head of the chemical division called Bryukhanov to report an incident at the station. He had not been informed that there was another attempt at the rundown test that night. While on a bus passing by the fourth reactor block, Bryukhanov realized the upper structure of the reactor was gone. He ordered all authorities to meet at the nuclear bunker in the basement of the administration building. Bryukhanov attempted to contact the shift supervisor, but there was no answer at the fourth reactor block. He then activated a General Radiation Accident on the automatic telephone system, which sent a coded message to the Ministry of Energy. He then had to report the situation to his superiors in Moscow and to the local Communist officials.

Lacking high-range dosimeters, officials had difficulty determining whether a radiation release had occurred or not and, if so, how much radiation had been released. Bryukhanov, assisted by chief engineer Nikolai Fomin, instructed the operators to maintain and restore coolant supply, unaware that the reactor had already been destroyed. The civil defense chief told him that radiation had reached the maximum reading of the military dosimeter of 200 roentgens per hour. At 3:00 a.m., Bryukhanov contacted Vladimir V. Marin, the official in charge of nuclear matters of the Communist Party at his Moscow home to report the accident and assure officials that the situation was under control. The radiation team reported that levels was only 13 microroentgens per hour, which was reassuring but incorrect. At 5:15, deputy chief engineer Anatoly Dyatlov, who had been overseeing the test, staggered into the bunker with the operating reports showing power levels and coolant pressure charts.

At night I went to the courtyard of the station. I looked – pieces of graphite under my feet. But I still did not think that the reactor was destroyed. This did not fit in my head. Only later, when the helicopter flew around...

==== Aftermath ====
Bryukhanov was summoned to Moscow and attended a turbulent meeting with the Politburo on 3 July in which the causes of the accident were discussed. In attendance was the RBMK designer Anatoly Alexandrov, Efim Slavsky of the Ministry of Medium Machine Building (Sredmash) and Valery Legasov of the Kurchatov Institute. Bryukhanov was accused of mismanagement and it was decided that operator error was the primary cause of the accident, while reactor design flaws were also a factor. Mikhail Gorbachev was furious and accused the nuclear designers of covering up dangerous problems with the Soviet nuclear industry for decades. Following the meeting, Bryukhanov was expelled from the CPSU.

On his return, he faced further questioning by investigators. On 19 July, an official explanation was published in Vremya, blaming the disaster entirely on the operators and local management. The KGB classified the true cause of the accident. On hearing the news on TV, Bryukhanov's mother collapsed from a heart attack and died. Bryukhanov was charged on 12 August and imprisoned by the KGB. At first, he refused legal representation since he regarded the verdict as pre-determined, but his wife, during her permitted monthly visit, changed his mind. As part of discovery procedures dictated by the law, investigators brought him the materials they uncovered during their inquiries, which were used in a case against him. Bryukhanov also found a letter written by one of the Kurchatov Institute experts, which revealed the perilous design faults that were kept hidden from him and his staff for 16 years. On 20 January 1987, after he sat in isolation for six weeks, the prosecutor's office filed their closing indictment with the Supreme Court of the Soviet Union. All of the 48 files of evidence sent to Moscow were classified.

Bryukhanov was charged with gross violation of safety regulations, creating conditions that led to an explosion, mismanagement by understating the radiation levels after the accident and sending people into known contaminated areas. For the lesser charges of administrative negligence, Bryukhanov entered a guilty plea. He contested the more serious charges of abuse of power brought against him. In his testimony, he defended the plant's safety record and emphasized the difficulty of his duties but did little else to defend himself. He knew the outcome was largely predetermined and he had to play his part at least.

Initially, on the charge brought against me, on August 13, 1986, when I was charged, I wrote my objections and disagreements on the charges. I disagree with them. I am guilty as a leader, I did not finish something, somewhere I showed negligence, indiscretion. I understand that the accident is serious, but everyone has their own fault in it.

Bryukhanov was found guilty and given the maximum sentence of ten years. He was sent to a penal colony in Donetsk to serve his sentence.

=== Later life ===
In September 1991, he was released early for good behavior. After his release, he worked in the ministry of international trade in Kyiv. Bryukhanov lived with his wife in the Desnianskyi District in Kyiv from 1992. He had served half of his 10-year jail term.

In 1995, Bryukhanov worked as an employee of Ukrinterenergo, Ukraine's state-owned energy company, in charge of liquidating the consequences of the Chernobyl accident. By his 80th birthday in December 2015, Bryukhanov had retired due to failing eyesight.

Bryukhanov stressed in various interviews that neither he nor his employees were to blame for the Chernobyl disaster, and claimed the accident was caused by "the imperfection of technology."

Bryukhanov died in Kyiv on 13 October 2021, at the age of 85. The official cause of death was not communicated. Bryukhanov had a severe form of Parkinson's disease, in addition to having suffered a series of strokes in 2015 and 2016.

== Family ==
- Wife – Valentina, electrical engineer, in the years 1975–1990 – senior engineer of the production department of Chernobyl, now retired
- Daughter – Lily (born 1961), a pediatrician, a resident of Kherson
- Son – Oleg (born 1969), mechanic for automatic CHP-5 management systems, from Kyiv

== Awards ==
- Laureate of the Republican Prize of the Ukrainian SSR (1978)
- Order of the Red Banner of Labour (1978)
- Order of the October Revolution (1983)
- Medals "For Valiant Labour. In commemoration of the centenary of the birth of V. I. Lenin" and "Veteran of Labour"
- Certificate of Honour of the Supreme Council of the Ukrainian SSR (1980).

== Media ==
- Bryukhanov appeared in the documentary Radiophobia.
- In the miniseries Chernobyl, Con O'Neill played the role of Viktor Bryukhanov.
