= International Nuclear Safety Group =

The International Nuclear Safety Group, formerly the International Nuclear Safety Advisory Group (INSAG), is an international organization focused on making nuclear safety clear and accessible for the public that was created by the International Atomic Energy Agency (IAEA) in 1985. Under the direction of the IAEA, INSAG helps in providing recommendations on nuclear safety approaches, creates new safety plans and procedures to follow, and emphasizes the importance of nuclear safety. The INSAG headquarters are located in Vienna, Austria.

== History ==
The IAEA was originally established in 1957 with the goal of advocating the use of nuclear energy. By 1985, it was recognised that an international group of experts was required to improve nuclear safety.

The first major accident that the organization investigated was the Chernobyl disaster of April 26, 1986. This resulted in INSAG-1, their first report. In 2002, the group's mission was revised, and it was renamed the International Nuclear Safety Group, but the acronym INSAG was retained. INSAG's new scope is to "Provide recommendations and opinions on current and emerging nuclear safety issues to the IAEA, the nuclear community and the public."

== See also ==
- INSAG publications
