= Nikolai Fomin (engineer) =

Chief engineer of Chernobyl Nuclear Power Plant during the disaster

Nikolai Maximovich Fomin
- Born: Nikolai Maximovich Fomin; 1937 (age 88–89); Novoekonomichne, Donetsk Oblast, Ukrainian SSR, Soviet Union (now Ukraine)
- Citizenship: Russia
- Known for: Chief engineer of the Chernobyl Nuclear Power Plant
- Awards: Order of Friendship of Peoples

Nikolai Maximovich Fomin (Russian: Николай Максимович Фомин, Ukrainian: Микола Максимович Фомін, romanized: Mykola Maksymovych Fomin; born 1937 in Novoekonomichne, Donetsk Oblast, Ukrainian SSR) is a Soviet-Ukrainian engineer. He was the chief engineer of the Chernobyl Nuclear Power Plant from 1981 until the Chernobyl nuclear disaster in 1986.

== Biography ==
Nikolai Maximovich Fomin was born in Novoekonomichne, Donetsk Oblast, in the year 1937.

Fomin was a member of the central CPSU, but was expelled after the Chernobyl disaster. He started his career at the Zaporizhzhia thermal power station. In 1972 he began working at the Chernobyl plant. As chief engineer, he approved the infamous turbine safety test that led to the explosion of the reactor. However, the deputy chief engineer, Anatoly Dyatlov, was responsible for the test.

Fomin learned of the accident at about 4 am on April 26, 1986, and participated in cleaning up during the aftermath of the disaster. He was subsequently arrested together with plant director Viktor Bryukhanov. The start of the trial, originally scheduled for March 24, 1987, had to be postponed several times due to Fomin's suicide attempt. During the trial, Fomin blamed the operators for deviating from the test plan. Eventually, he and Bryukhanov were found guilty and were each sentenced to 10 years in prison.

While in prison, Fomin received psychiatric treatment several times. For health reasons, he was released from prison early and transferred to a psychiatric hospital. After his release from the hospital, he worked at the Kalinin Nuclear Power Plant. Since his retirement in 2000, he has lived with his wife, children and grandchildren in Udomlya.

== In popular culture ==
In the HBO television series Chernobyl, he is portrayed by Adrian Rawlins.
