= Sophie Gilbert =

British writer

- Website: www.sophie-gilbert.com

Sophie Gilbert is a British-born writer and journalist who works at The Atlantic in Washington, D.C., United States.

== Early life and education ==
Sophie Gilbert moved to the United States in 2007 from London, where she was born. She earned her Master's degree in magazine journalism at the New York University while interning for Vogue and Slate.

== Career ==
Gilbert's articles appeared on The Washington Post, The New Republic, and Slate and she was hired as the Washingtonian monthly's arts editor.

=== The Atlantic ===
Gilbert began working for The Atlantic as a staff writer. In 2014, she was promoted to senior editor, in charge of special reports and projects, as well as writing on entertainment and culture.

=== Books ===
External videos
- After Words interview with Gilbert on Girl on Girl, May 9, 2025, C-SPAN

In 2023, Gilbert published a collection of essays titled On Womanhood: Bodies, Literature, Choice.

In 2025, she published Girl on Girl: How Pop Culture Turned a Generation of Women Against Themselves, characterized by the New Yorker reviewer as "the most ambitious of the feminist reappraisals of the two-thousands." In an Atlantic article adapted from Girl on Girl, Gilbert reveals she did not begin to question how coming of age in this "hypersexualized, internet-enabled environment" had affected her until a few months into the coronavirus pandemic, when she gave birth to twins. The book was generally praised by reviewers.

== Recognition and awards ==
In 2022, Gilbert was a finalist for the 2022 Pulitzer Prize for Criticism.

In 2024, she received the year's National Magazine Award for Reviews and Criticism.
