= Paul Ritter =

English actor (1966–2021)

- Born: Simon Paul Adams; 20 December 1966; Gravesend, Kent, England
- Died: 5 April 2021 (aged 54); Faversham, Kent, England
- Education: St John's College, Cambridge
- Occupation: Actor
- Years active: 1992–2021
- Spouse: Polly Radcliffe (m. 1996)
- Children: 2

Simon Paul Adams (20 December 1966 – 5 April 2021), known professionally as Paul Ritter, was an English actor. His film roles included Son of Rambow (2007), Quantum of Solace (2008), Harry Potter and the Half-Blood Prince (2009), The Eagle (2011), and Operation Mincemeat (2021). His television roles included Friday Night Dinner (2011–2020), Vera (2011–2013), The Hollow Crown (2012), The Last Kingdom (2015), Chernobyl (2019), Resistance (2019), and Belgravia (2020).

== Early life ==
Ritter was born Simon Paul Adams on 20 December 1966 in Gravesend, Kent. His father Ken Adams, a turner and fitter, worked at various CEGB power stations; his mother Joan (née Mooney) was a school secretary. His family were Catholic and he had four older sisters. Adams attended Gravesend Grammar School and went on to study German and French at St John's College, Cambridge.

After graduating, he went to the Deutsches Schauspielhaus in Hamburg, Germany. Upon returning to the UK, he took the stage name Ritter, of German origin. He took this name because another Simon Adams was registered with the acting trade union, Equity, and he admired a German actor with the surname Ritter.

Ritter studied alongside the actor Stephen Mangan and they later acted together in a 2009 revival of the play The Norman Conquests.

== Career ==
Ritter's screen work included roles in Nowhere Boy, the 2007 television serial Instinct, the comedy drama Pulling and the role of Pistol in Henry IV, Part II and Henry V in BBC Two's cycle of William Shakespeare's history plays, The Hollow Crown; The Daily Telegraph described Ritter as "an actor who is surely destined for greatness very soon. His Pistol conveyed perfectly the shock of a man who reluctantly had left behind the rowdy cheer of Eastcheap, and found himself in middle age contemplating the melancholy of a medieval autumn." Ritter also played comic actor Eric Sykes in Tommy Cooper: Not Like That, Like This and took a lead role in BBC One's 2014 serialised Cold War spy drama, The Game.

From 2005 to 2006, Ritter played Otis Gardiner in the original Royal National Theatre production of Helen Edmundson's Coram Boy, for which he was nominated for an Olivier Award. He was nominated for a Tony Award in 2009 for his role in The Norman Conquests. In 2012, he appeared as the protagonist's father in the stage version of Mark Haddon's novel The Curious Incident of the Dog in the Night-Time at the National Theatre and in 2013 as John Major in the premiere of Peter Morgan's The Audience.

He appeared in the first three series (2011-13) of British crime drama Vera, as pathologist Dr. Billy Cartwright. He also appeared in a main role as Anatoly Dyatlov, the deputy chief engineer, in the HBO and Sky Max miniseries Chernobyl. Ritter's performance in the latter was critically acclaimed.

From 2011 to 2020, Ritter starred as Martin Goodman in the Channel 4 comedy series, Friday Night Dinner. For this role, he received a posthumous nomination at the 2021 British Academy Television Awards for the Best Male Comedy Performance.

Ritter's final performance was in the 2021 film Operation Mincemeat as Bentley Purchase. The film was released posthumously and was dedicated to his memory.

== Personal life and death ==
In 1996, Ritter married Polly Radcliffe, a research fellow at King's College London. He lived in Faversham, Kent. He had two sons, Frank and Noah.

Ritter died of a brain tumour on 5 April 2021, aged 54, in his home, surrounded by his family. His friend, Stephen Mangan, tweeted "Trying to find a way to talk about Paul Ritter and struggling. My friend since we were students together. So much talent and it shone from him even as a teenager. I was so lucky to know him and lucky too to work with him many times over the years. Wonderful man." Fellow Friday Night Dinner cast members also paid tribute. A tenth anniversary retrospective of Friday Night Dinner aired on 28 May 2021.

== Acting credits ==
Year	Title	Role	Notes
1992, 1996	The Bill – "Overdue", "Accidents Will Happen"	Tony Walgrave, Terry Webster	
1995	National Achievement Day 1995	Beach	
1999	G:MT – Greenwich Mean Time	Drug Buyer	
2000	The Nine Lives of Tomas Katz	Dave	
2002	Esther Kahn	Alman, the photographer	
2004	The Libertine	Chiffinch	
2005	On a Clear Day	Mad Bob	
2007	Son of Rambow	Geography Teacher	
2007	Hannibal Rising	Prisoner Louis	
2007	Waking the Dead	Alan Pierce	TV series (Series 6, episode 7: "Mask of Sanity")
2008	The Other Man	Guy	
2008	Quantum of Solace	Guy Haines	
2008	Love You More	Record Shop Owner	Short Film
2009	Pulling	Martin	
2009	Harry Potter and the Half-Blood Prince	Eldred Worple	
2009	Nowhere Boy	Popjoy	
2011–2020	Friday Night Dinner	Martin Goodman	Series regular, all 37 episodes
2011	Great Expectations	John Wemmick	
2011	Land Girls	Frank Tucker	
2011	The Eagle	Galba	
2011	Lark Rise to Candleford	Mr Steerforth	TV series (Series 4, episode 1)
2011–2013	Vera	Dr Billy Cartwright	
2011	Eliminate: Archie Cookson	Ennis Miller	
2012	Midsomer Murders	Harry Fleetwood	“The Dark Rider” S15E1
2012	Comedy Showcase	Jim Costello	
2012	Dirk Gently	Oliver Reynolds	
2012	Henry IV, Part II	Ancient Pistol	
2012	Henry V	Ancient Pistol	
2014	The Bletchley Circle	Professor Masters	TV series (episode: "Blood on their hands – Part 2")
2014	Tommy Cooper: Not Like That, Like This	Eric Sykes	
2014	Chasing Shadows	Leonard Vance	
2014	The Game	Bobby Waterhouse	
2014	Mapp & Lucia	Reverend Kenneth Bartlett	
2014	Suite Française	Monsieur Dubois	
2014	Plebs	Angelo	TV series (Series 2, episode: "The Baby")
2015–2018	No Offence	Randolph Miller	Series regular, all 21 episodes
2015	Top Coppers	Harry McCrane	
2015	The Last Kingdom	King Peredur	Season 1, episode 6
2015	We're Doomed! The Dad's Army Story	Jimmy Perry	
2016	Their Finest	Raymond Parfitt	
2016	Neil Gaiman's Likely Stories	Dr. Benham/Martyn/Mr. Alman	
2016	Inferno	CRC Tech Arbogast	
2016	Houdini & Doyle	Bram Stoker	Episode 8, "Strigoi"
2017	Urban Myths	Dave	Episode: "Bob Dylan: Knockin' on Dave's Door"
2017	Philip K. Dick's Electric Dreams	Franklyn	
2017–2020	Cold Feet	Benjamin Stevens	
2018	Lovesick	Peter	
2018	Hang Ups	Werner Lienhard	
2019	Resistance	General Ormonde Winter	Released as Rebellion Season 2 on Netflix
2019	Chernobyl	Anatoly Dyatlov	Mini-series
2019	The Capture	Marcus Levy	
2019	Catherine the Great	Alexander Suvorov	
2019–2020	The Trial of Christine Keeler	Jeremy Hutchinson	
2020	Belgravia	Turton	TV series
2021	Friday Night Dinner: Ten Years And A Lovely Bit of Squirrel	Himself	Posthumous release
2022	Operation Mincemeat	Bentley Purchase	Posthumous release; final film role (dedicated in memory)

== Awards and nominations ==
Year	Award	Category	Work	Result	Ref.
2006	Laurence Olivier Award	Best Performance in a Supporting Role	Coram Boy	Nominated	
2009	Tony Award	Best Featured Actor in a Play	The Norman Conquests	Nominated	
2009	Laurence Olivier Award	Best Performance in a Supporting Role	The Norman Conquests	Nominated	
2009	Drama Desk Award	Outstanding Ensemble Performance	The Norman Conquests	Honouree	
2009	Outer Critics Circle Award	Outstanding Ensemble Performance	The Norman Conquests	Honouree	
2009	Theatre World Award	Special Award	The Norman Conquests	Honouree	
2019	Online Film & Television Association	Best Ensemble in a Motion Picture or Limited Series	Chernobyl	Nominated	
2021	British Academy Television Award	Male Performance in a Comedy Programme	Friday Night Dinner	Nominated	
