= Valery Legasov =

Soviet inorganic chemist (1936–1988)

- Валерий Легасов
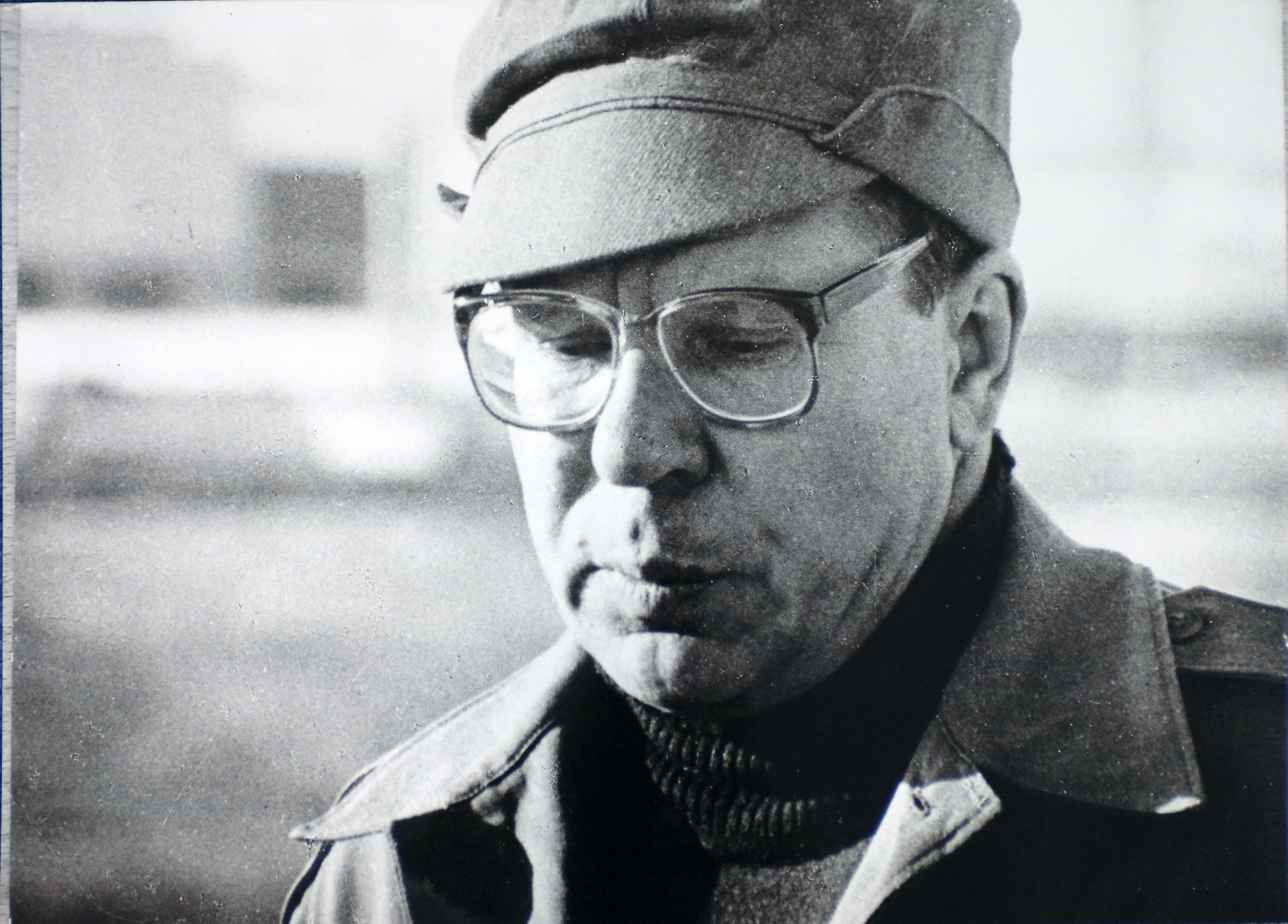
- Legasov, c. 1986
- Born: 1 September 1936; Tula, Russian SFSR, Soviet Union
- Died: 27 April 1988 (aged 51); Moscow, Russian SFSR, Soviet Union
- Cause of death: Suicide by hanging
- Resting place: Novodevichy Cemetery, Moscow, Russia
- Education: Moscow D. Mendeleev Institute of Chemical Technology
- Known for: Efforts to contain the 1986 Chernobyl disaster and presenting the findings of the investigative commission as chief scientific advisor
- Spouse: Margarita Mikhailovna
- Children: 2
- Awards: Order of Lenin; Order of the Red Banner of Labour; Hero of the Russian Federation (posthumous)
- Scientific career
- Fields: Inorganic chemistry
- Workplaces: I. V. Kurchatov Institute of Atomic Energy; Moscow Institute of Physics and Technology; Moscow State University
- Doctoral advisor: Isaak Kikoin

Valery Alekseyevich Legasov (Russian: Валерий Алексеевич Легасов; 1 September 1936 – 27 April 1988) was a Soviet inorganic chemist, professor at Moscow State University, first deputy director of the Kurchatov Institute of Atomic Energy, and a member of the Academy of Sciences of the Soviet Union.

He is best known for his efforts to contain the 1986 Chernobyl disaster. In August 1986, Legasov presented the findings of an investigation to the International Atomic Energy Agency at the United Nations Office at Vienna, detailing the actions and circumstances that led to the explosion in Chernobyl but neglecting to mention some of the RBMK reactor's design flaws.

Suffering from poor health because of radiation exposure, and frustrated that his attempts at reforming Soviet academic chemistry were rebuffed, he died by suicide in 1988.

== Early life ==
Valery Alekseyevich Legasov was born on 1 September 1936 in Tula, Russian SFSR, into a family of civil workers. He attended secondary school in Kursk. In 1949–1954, he attended School No. 56 in Moscow and graduated with a gold medal. While he was a shy student, he excelled in both academic work and social activities being elected secretary of his school's Komsomol committee. During 1953, he proposed several reforms to the Komsomol committee to address what he perceived as indifference and passivity of its members. These ideas were quickly quashed by the authorities. His headmaster observed that Legasov "is a grown up man, a future statesman, a talented organizer. He can be a philosopher, а historian, an engineer..." The school now bears his name, and his bronze bust stands at the entrance. For two years he worked as a released secretary of the Central Committee of the Komsomol, he was elected to the bureau of the Soviet District Committee of the Komsomol and to the Moscow City Committee of the Komsomol. In 1961, he graduated from the Faculty of Physicochemical Engineering at the Mendeleev Moscow Institute of Chemistry and Technology, where he learned how nuclear fuel is processed, handled and disposed of.

== Personal life ==
Legasov married Margarita Mikhailovna and had two children. In his personal life, he composed poetry and encouraged its publication. He often visited the theater with his wife and loved reading Russian and foreign literature, particularly the works of Yuri Bondarev. Legasov was not religious but very interested in religious history and heritage.

== Career ==
For around two years, Legasov worked as an engineer at the Siberian Chemical Combine in the city of Tomsk-7, as a shift supervisor. He took this role in order to gain practical experience that would be the basis for later research. At Tomsk Polytechnic University, he started researching gaseous uranium hexachloride in a gaseous fission reactor. However, news of progress made by Neil Bartlett in Canada caused Legasov to switch his interest to noble gas chemistry. In 1962, he joined the graduate school in the Department of Molecular Physics of the Kurchatov Institute of Atomic Energy, first as a junior then senior researcher, and finally as head of the laboratory. In 1967, he defended his thesis at the Kurchatov Institute, under the supervisor Isaak Kikoin, on the synthesis of compounds of noble gases and the study of their properties. He received the degree of Candidate in 1967 and his doctorate in chemistry in 1972. At some stage, Legasov experienced facial injuries and minor scarring as a result of chemical experimentation.

In 1976, Legasov was elected as a corresponding member of the Academy of Sciences of the Soviet Union. From 1978 to 1983, he was a professor at the Moscow Institute of Physics and Technology. In 1981, he became a full member of the Academy of Sciences of the USSR, in the Department of Physical Chemistry and Technology of Inorganic Materials. He was a member of the Science and Technology Council of the Ministry of Medium Machine Building. From 1983 until his death, he worked as chair of the department of Radiochemistry and Chemical Technology at the Faculty of Chemistry at Moscow State University. In 1983, he became the first deputy director for scientific work of the Kurchatov Institute of Atomic Energy. His colleague Yu. A. Ustynyuk said of Legasov: "His main quality, which set him sharply apart from all the great organizing scientists I knew, was his exceptional dedication to the cause. Work was the main, almost the only meaning of his life."

Legasov researched hydrogen energy as a byproduct of nuclear energy, nuclear energy strategy, energy generation safety and synthesis of unusual compounds, which he regarded as a neglected niche within the institute's activities. Under his leadership, a scientific school was created for the newest subfield of inorganic chemistry – chemistry of noble gases. Working on reactor design was taboo for a chemist in the institute but he focused instead on related technologies, as well as assisted with the management of the institute.

I was interested in comparing the real dangers, the real threats that nuclear energy carries to the threats of other energy systems. This is what I was passionately working on, mainly figuring out the dangers in sources of energy alternative to nuclear energy.

Along with colleagues like Viktor Alekseyevich Sidorenko, Legasov became concerned about the quality of equipment, poor construction, the lack of training of operators and the lack of training simulators.

[Our nuclear systems] were painfully lacking in good control systems and extremely poor in diagnostic systems... I have not seen a single group in the Soviet Union that raised and considered [the analysis of nuclear safety] with any degree of competence... As for the RBMK reactor, you know, in reactor circles, it was considered a bad reactor. Viktor Alekseyevich Sidorenko had repeatedly criticised it. But this reactor was not considered bad because of safety reasons. From a safety point of view, it even stood out as being better, as I understood from the discussions. It was considered bad because of economic reasons... When I looked at this device, I was confused by, for example, an unusual and, in my opinion, insufficient construction of safety systems, that would work in extreme situations. [I began] to speak about the necessity of the next generation of reactors to be safer; say TTER reactors or liquid salt reactors that I was trying to present as the next steps towards safer reactors. But this caused a storm in the Ministry. A storm of indignation.

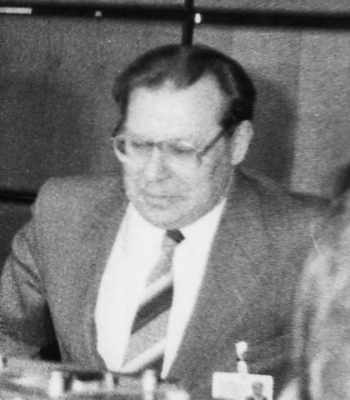
Valery Legasov

From 1984 to 1985, Legasov with other specialists had reviewed the state of chemistry research in the country and found it to be in a critical state. Under his leadership, a series of drastic reforms of the organization and funding of scientific institutions were drafted. The proposals triggered a significant backlash from the existing scientific leadership. While Legasov attempted to include all the top scientists in the new organization, many objected to Legasov being given a top leadership position, considering him an upstart. Malicious rumors began to be circulated such as the accusation of being an alcoholic, over-ambitious or to blame for the Chernobyl disaster.

...the information I had convinced me that not everything was well in the development of nuclear energy, as it seemed to me... Science organizations began to weaken, not strengthen. Slowly, once the most powerful in the country, they began to lose the standard of modern equipment. The staff began to age. Fewer young people joined. New approaches were not welcomed. Gradually, imperceptibly, but it was happening... I witnessed all this, but it was hard for me to intervene in the process purely professionally while general declarations on this subject were received with hostility. Because an attempt by a non-professional to bring some kind of insight into their work could hardly be acceptable... the scientific spirit and the scientific atmosphere in reactor engineering gradually began to submit to the engineering will, as it were, to the ministerial will... All conceptual talks, all attempts at adopting a scientific, consistent approach towards this problem, they did not accept at all.

Excessive hierarchy has always been contraindicated for science, it stifles it. Science, like art, does not tolerate intermediate links. It is necessary to get rid of people who interfere with work. Scribbling and formalism have reached such a scale that it is already difficult for science to bear this cross.

In the public sphere, he still kept to the official position that nuclear power was safe. In January 1986, Legasov co-authored a propaganda piece in Soviet Life magazine claiming there had been no nuclear accidents that had seriously threatened personnel or risked contamination, which ignored multiple serious nuclear incidents in the Soviet Union. Even before the Chernobyl disaster, Legasov was known to stress the need for new security and safety methods to prevent large catastrophes. He had been involved in work on industrial safety with the State Committee for Science and Technology, in which he had explored the risks involved in energy generation. Legasov was particularly concerned with complex systems reliant on a single operator without adequate safety systems. Legasov had the opportunity to visit nuclear power plants in the West, such as the Soviet designed Loviisa Nuclear Power Plant in Finland, and was shocked at the higher safety standards, better equipment, a containment structure and superior construction.

== Chernobyl disaster ==
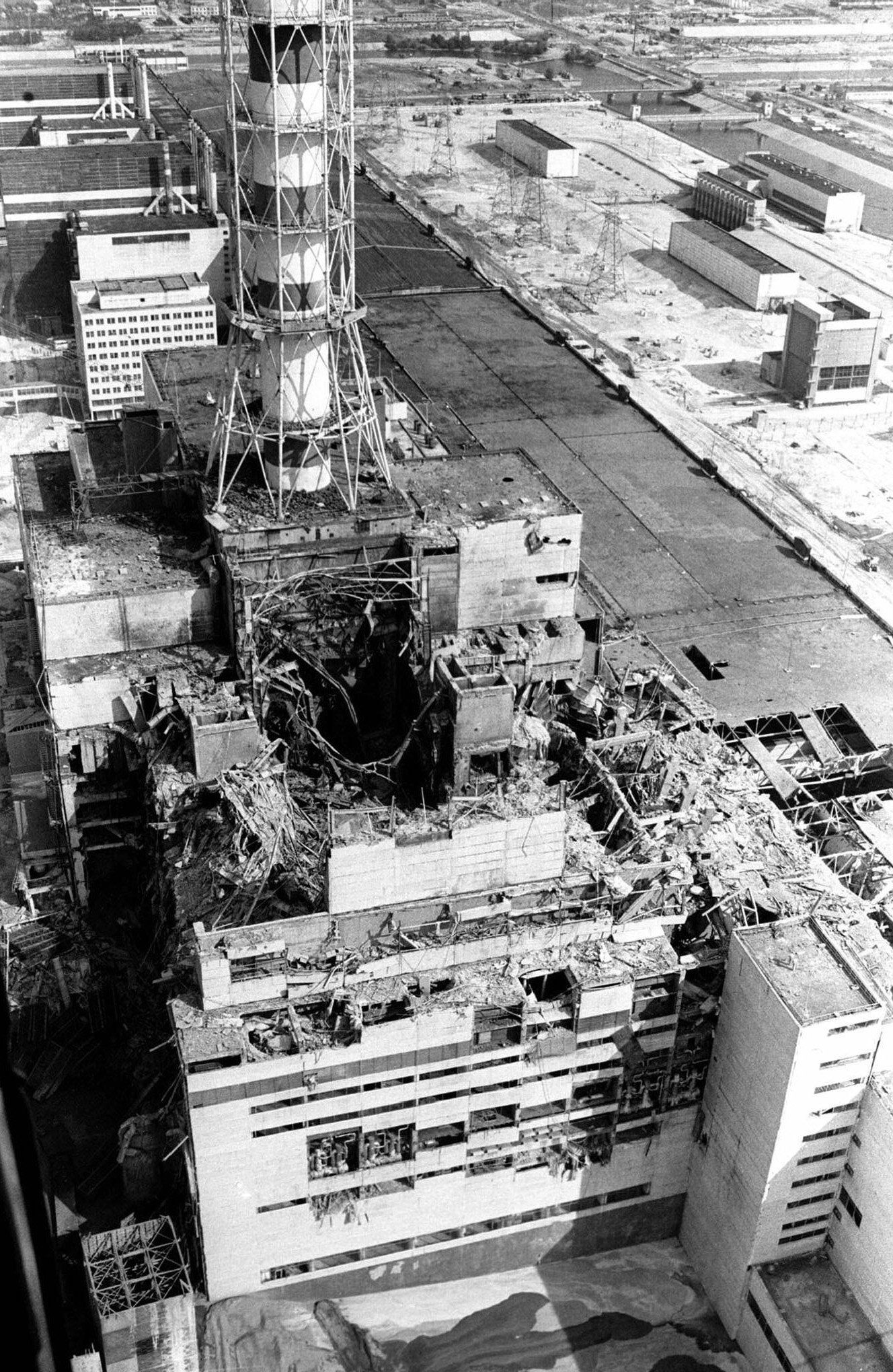
Reactor 4 several months after the disaster.

Reactor 4 of the Chernobyl nuclear plant exploded on 26 April 1986 at 1:23:45 a.m., releasing a massive amount of radiation and contaminating a large area. By that time, Legasov was the first deputy director of the Kurchatov Institute of Atomic Energy. Although not a reactor specialist, he became a key member of the government commission formed to investigate the causes of the disaster and to plan the mitigation of its consequences. Legasov was told he was assigned to a government commission that was looking into the accident.

At Vnukovo airport, Legasov met Boris Shcherbina, the head of the government commission dealing with the accident response. When the team reached Pripyat, Legasov was put in charge of containing the radiation. Viktor Alekseyevich Sidorenko called for immediate evacuation of Pripyat, which Legasov supported, as the situation was expected to deteriorate in the town, and this decision was approved by Shcherbina. To make direct measurements of the reactor, Legasov was driven in an armored personnel carrier to the site which established the reactor had shut down. Despite lacking information about the state of the reactor, Legasov proposed and managed the effort to extinguish the reactor fire which would otherwise release a massive amount of radiation, although the team was in continual discussions with other scientists by telephone. One Kurchatov scientist warned him that the helicopter drops might not be effective but Legasov replied that they had to be seen to do something. Legasov admired the leadership of Shcherbina, particularly his ability to grasp what the specialists were telling him and his decision making. Nikolay Antoshkin, an air force general involved in the liquidation, remembers:

I met Valery Alekseyevich as soon as he arrived. From that moment on, a working friendship, which then grew into a deeper friendship, was formed with him and with other comrades. I liked him from the very beginning. I was filled with trust and respect for him. ... Valery Alekseyevich himself flew over the reactor by helicopter 5–6 times a day. Scientists, smart, literate, and when it was necessary to go forward, they found themselves without means of protection. ... He was a man of courage, understanding everything, but at the same time defenseless.

At one point, Antoshkin scolded Legasov for taking too many personal risks when he was key to the operation. On the second or third day, Legasov suggested organizing an information group to collect and disseminate accurate information to the press, but this did not occur, and he later observed that the press often interviewed the most famous person present rather than the most knowledgeable, introducing many inaccuracies and omissions in reporting. Legasov received many telegrams from around the world containing advice ranging from benevolent to provocative.

On 2 May, he and other commission members reported to visiting high-ranking officials that this was no ordinary industrial accident but would require a significant containment effort, as well as a review of the future of the other reactors. This resulted in huge resources being allocated to Chernobyl. Most of the first government commission were replaced by new staff due to radiation exposure. When the first government commission group returned to Moscow, Legasov was asked to stay by Shcherbina but was replaced by his scientific rival Evgeny Velikhov in the formal hierarchy. The team began to be concerned with small areas of reactor activity, as well as the integrity of the concrete pad. Velikhov in particular was concerned that the reactor remains could melt deep into the ground, as shown in the US film The China Syndrome. Water in the lower barboteur was drained but Legasov was convinced that an explosion was not possible, in contrast to what some scientists and politicians feared. He also considered the possibility of ground water contamination to be extremely low, but precautionary work was initiated to cool the reactor using an underground system. Legasov considered these containment steps to be excessive but understandable, while also providing the infrastructure for the eventual construction of a shelter sarcophagus over the reactor. He opposed a plan to extend the underground cooling system outside the reactor 4 building, as well as other projects he considered to be redundant. Legasov was impressed by the operation of the KGB in the area but considered the Civil Defence group to be in shambles. He was also concerned at the lack of safety literature distributed to the population. Legasov thought people worked together efficiently and this put them in good spirits.

On 5 May, Legasov was summoned to meet with the Politburo in Moscow, including Mikhail Gorbachev, to report on progress. Legasov and Anatoly Alexandrov described the meltdown scenarios, and Legasov agreed with the plan to tunnel under the reactor to provide cooling. After the meeting, Shcherbina told him that he could work from Moscow but was quickly ordered back to Chernobyl. Legasov reassured Gorbachev by phone that the scale of contamination was understood and the reactor was not a continuing threat to other countries. Legasov developed a plan to extinguish the reactor fire using nitrogen gas pumped throughout the plant's pipe network but the pipes were too badly damaged to be effective. Around 9–10 May, Gorbachev requested a chronology of events and the cause of the accident in preparation for an interview, which Legasov provided in writing with a few edits from other investigators.

After 10 May, the situation had somewhat stabilized and Legasov was able to spend less time at the accident site but still frequently visited. Upon returning from Chernobyl for the second time on 12 May, he was a changed man, suffering from severe grief and radiation sickness. Spending four months in and around Chernobyl, he received a high dose of radiation. He was assigned to compile a report for the International Atomic Energy Agency about the causes and aftermath of the accident. Some in the Ministry of Medium Machine Building (Sredmash) opposed his appointment, fearing Legasov would be difficult to control, since the nuclear establishment wanted to divert blame to others if possible.

Legasov attended a turbulent meeting with the Politburo on 3 July, in which the causes of the accident and flaws in the RBMK reactor were discussed. In attendance was the former plant director Viktor Bryukhanov, RBMK designer Alexandrov and Efim Slavsky of Sredmash. Bryukhanov was accused of mismanagement and that operator error was the primary cause of the accident, while design flaws were also a factor. Gorbachev was furious and accused the designers of covering up dangerous problems with the Soviet nuclear industry for decades. Legasov only spoke up to admit that scientists had failed in their duty and that he had been warning about the safety problems of the RBMK reactor for years but nothing had been done.

With the first draft of Legasov's report received by the Central Committee, some were shocked and one minister forwarded it to the KGB with the recommendation that the authors be prosecuted. To find fault with the reactor design would directly implicate senior members of the Soviet government.

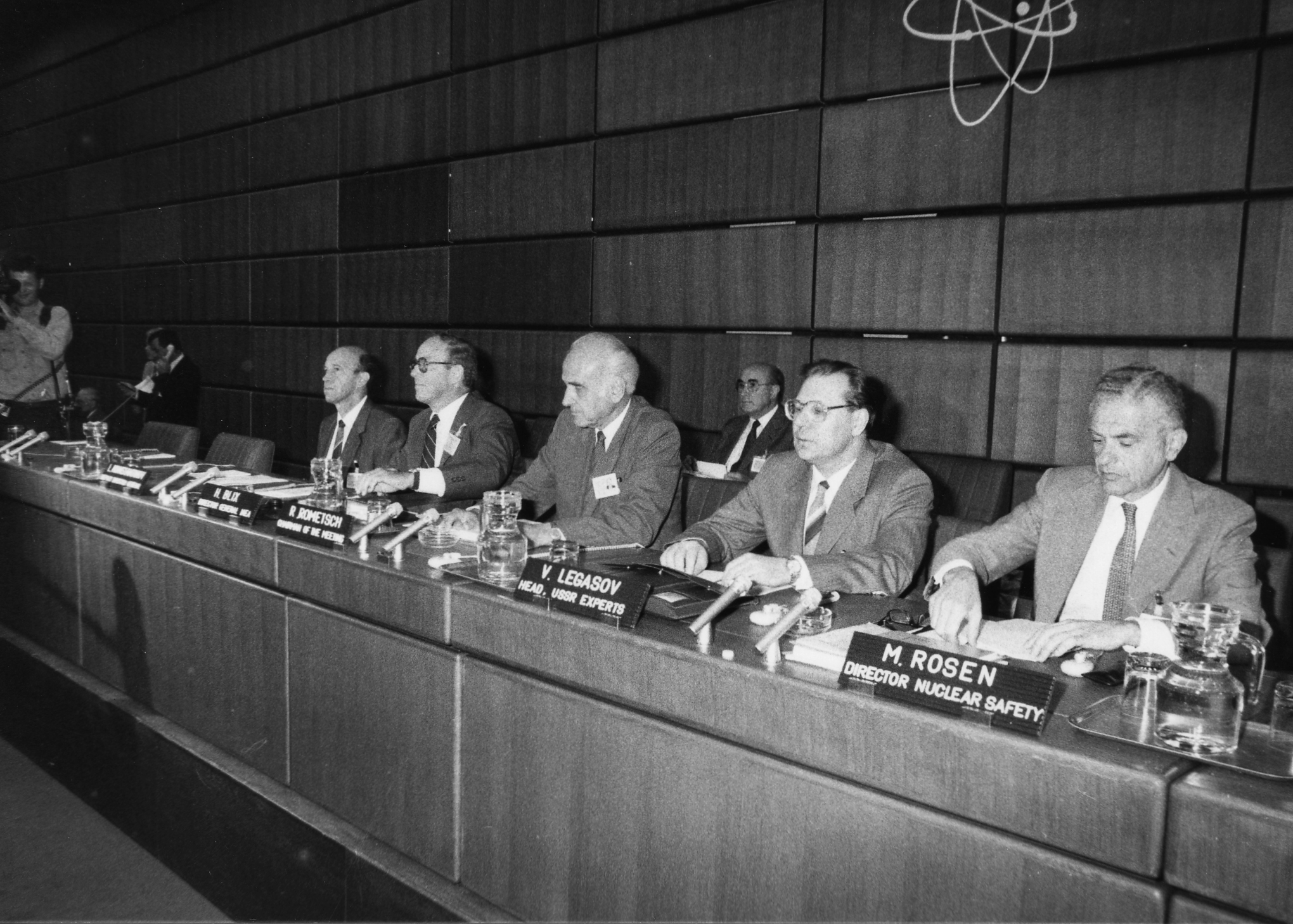
Legasov (second from right) at a Vienna press conference, August 1986

In August 1986, Legasov presented the report of the Soviet delegation at a special meeting of the International Atomic Energy Agency in Vienna. His report was noted for its great detail and relative openness in discussing the extent and consequences of the tragedy, disclosed to Western media some defects in the RBMK reactor design such as the positive void coefficient, as well as problems with operator training. Some details were censored by the Central Committee, including the full extent of the design flaws, the institutional and cultural problems that led to the accident, the full extent of the fallout, as well as the ineffective efforts in dropping liquid nitrogen into the reactor. The report ran to 388 pages and was presented by Legasov to the conference in a five-hour presentation, which many in the audience found disturbing. Legasov noted that the operators were able to disable the reactor safety systems and stated that improvements to existing RBMK reactors were underway. He stated, "I did not lie in Vienna... but I did not tell the full truth."

The conference was a public relations triumph for the Soviets as it reassured Western governments and scientists that the disaster was being contained and that the Soviets could competently manage nuclear power in the future.

== After Vienna ==
As a result of this work in Vienna, Legasov "became very popular, in Europe he was named the person of the year, he entered the top ten scientists in the world. This caused serious jealousy among his colleagues." In public, Legasov supported the official story that operator error caused the accident. In private, he campaigned for reactor safety and institutional reorganization. Perhaps in response to this, Legasov received criticism of his leadership and his handling of the containment of the Chernobyl reactor and was ostracized by some of his fellow scientists. Resistance came from the old guard, who resisted change, and among younger reformers who regarded Legasov as a relic of the previous Era of Stagnation. One senior scientist wrote "Legasov was a clear representative of that scientific mafia whose political leanings instead of scientific leadership led to the Chernobyl accident." In spring 1987, a vote was held by the Kurchatov Institute to their Scientific-Technical Council with Legasov standing at the insistence of his mentor Anatoly Alexandrov. The institute members denied Legasov the position which was perhaps surprising given his seniority and public visibility. He was very disappointed that he was the only member of his Chernobyl team that did not receive the award Hero of Socialist Labor. His treatment may have been due to irking senior members of the scientific community with his independence, his habit of violating the chain of command and his lack of deference to the scientific establishment. Even after Chernobyl, he remained a proponent of nuclear power generation.

Legasov's health had worsened and he often made visits to Moscow Hospital 6 for long term effects of radiation exposure. Around June 1987, he attempted suicide but was saved by his colleagues. Legasov recorded his memoir The Legasov Testament using audio tapes where he described his involvement with the Chernobyl liquidation.

And when I visited the Chernobyl station after the accident and saw what was happening there, I myself drew a precise and unequivocal conclusion, that the Chernobyl disaster is an apotheosis, the pinnacle of all the mismanagement that has been carried out for decades in our country. ... [In operation there was] No careful monitoring of the instrument, no attention to the condition of the equipment between planned preventive maintenance... When one looks at the chain of events, why someone acted in this way and another in that way and so on, it is impossible to point to a single culprit, an initiator of all the unpleasant events that led to the crime. Because it is a chain that links to itself... allowing operation of stations without an external localisation shelter. This mistake was fundamental... The first design mistake was that there should be at least two emergency protection systems, as required by international standards and as common sense suggests... second emergency protection system must work independently, whatever the circumstances of the operator may be ... And finally, the third design mistake, which is hard to explain, was that all the numerous emergency protection systems were accessible to the station staff... Of course, the mistakes made by the operators are well known and there is no need to list them yet again. These mistakes themselves are monstrous... I would very much like to ask to make such a statement that, as of today, we do not have safe nuclear energy, or a concept of safe nuclear energy, or even a concept of a safe nuclear reactor that is completely ready...

He had a lengthy stay in hospital during the fall of 1987, including experiencing acute appendicitis, during which he attempted suicide. During his stay, journalist Ales Adamovich interviewed Legasov, and he expressed concerns that a similar nuclear accident could still occur. Legasov had an article on industrial safety entitled "From Today to Tomorrow" published in Pravda on 5 October 1987, but it received little interest. He gave interviews to Novy Mir and Yunost in which he changed his public stance and expressed his concern that cultural failings and Soviet science losing its way had led inevitably to nuclear disaster. After a colleague said his leadership was still needed, he said "No, you don't understand. I know that it can be difficult; you need to endure, wait it out. And here is a completely different situation – everything inside me is burned..." and on another occasion "I'm now like the mythical Midas, only he turned everything he took into gold, and as for me – everything turns into air, even worse, into a vacuum. Whatever I touch – everything is ruined: no one needs anything! And there is still so much to do!"

I feel sick thinking about exactly what is most likely to happen to us in the near future... [Major industrial accidents will happen] unless the necessary measures are taken. Moreover, the measures that can be taken to prevent this from happening are known. But the most demoralizing part, which makes one worried and sick, is that the measures needed are known.

Legasov continued his attempts to introduce reforms in academic chemistry by establishing an interdepartmental council to try to overcome stagnation in the field. This plan was rejected on 26 April 1988, the day before his death. Ustynyuk was called to Legasov's office and found him to be "extremely agitated and low-spirited" following the decision. He felt that the leadership would be split between the council and the Academy of Sciences of the Soviet Union, saying "This will lead to disaster. I must resign." That afternoon, he briefly visited his daughter. Ustynyuk called Legasov at 22:30 on the same day saying he might still prevail with support from other top scientists that had not been consulted on the decision.

== Death ==
On 27 April 1988, the day after the second anniversary of the Chernobyl Nuclear Power Plant accident and one day before he was due to release the outcomes of the investigation into the causes of the disaster, Legasov hanged himself in the stairwell of his Moscow apartment (though some sources say inside his apartment, others in his office). He was buried at the Novodevichy Cemetery in Moscow. Legasov was 51 years old. By the time of his death, Legasov had been exposed to 150 rem (1.5 Sv) of radiation, which was far above safe levels.

There are several theories concerning Legasov's motivations and state of mind. David R. Marples has suggested the anniversary of the Chernobyl disaster on his psychological state was the factor leading to his decision to take his own life and that Legasov had become bitterly disillusioned with the failure of the authorities to confront the design flaws. Legasov's daughter commented, "It was not an emotional breakdown, it was a deliberate, thoroughly considered act." Ustynyuk emphasized the role of the harassment of Legasov by other scientific leaders in their resistance to organizational reform. Boris Shcherbina said of him: "Valery was too great, I loved him more than all the people I knew, he gave all of himself to work, to Chernobyl. He burnt out." Journalists Vladimir Gubarev and Yuriy Shcherbak claim that his suicide was a conscious attempt to draw attention to the lack of nuclear safety in the Soviet Union.

== Aftermath ==
As a national hero at the time of his death, Legasov's suicide caused shockwaves in the Soviet nuclear industry. Extracts from his tapes were published in Pravda in May 1988.

Some in the scientific community were still displeased by Legasov and his legacy. A former colleague of Legasov said "There is no need to idealize Legasov. ... He is no better or worse than any manager of this rank, and he followed the accepted rules of the game, moving up the career and scientific ladder... he took on too much, especially in recent years. A chemist, he dared to define the topics of physics laboratories and departments. At the same time, he was not always right, he ordered what to do and how to do it. Who would like that? So they voted him down at the elections to the Academic Council. Physicists make up the majority. And you, chemists, are now making him almost a great martyr... And in Chernobyl he screwed up enough—the shelter of the fourth unit turned out to be far from optimal." Legasov's defenders counter this saying "His courage was not forgiven, because it clearly indicated the cowardice and ordinariness of others."

While the initial Soviet investigation put almost all the blame on the operators, later findings by the IAEA found that the reactor design and how the operators were informed of safety information was more significant. However, the operators were found to have deviated from operational procedures, changing test protocols on the fly, as well as having made "ill judged" actions, making human error a major contributing factor.

On 20 September 1996, Russian president Boris Yeltsin posthumously conferred on Legasov the honorary title of Hero of the Russian Federation, the country's highest honorary title, for the "courage and heroism" shown in his investigation of the disaster.

His wife Margarita wrote a considerable number of articles and books to preserve his legacy. In 2016, a bust and a commemorative plaque were installed on the wall of Valery Legasov's home in Tula.

== In media ==
Legasov is portrayed by Ade Edmondson in the BBC docudrama Surviving Disaster (2006) and by Jared Harris in the Sky/HBO miniseries Chernobyl (2019). He is also covered by Adam Curtis in his documentary series Pandora's Box (1992).

== See also ==
- List of Heroes of the Russian Federation
- Chernobyl liquidators
- Effects of the Chernobyl disaster
- List of Chernobyl-related articles
- Nuclear and radiation accidents and incidents
