= Outline of the Chernobyl disaster =

1986 nuclear accident in the Soviet Union

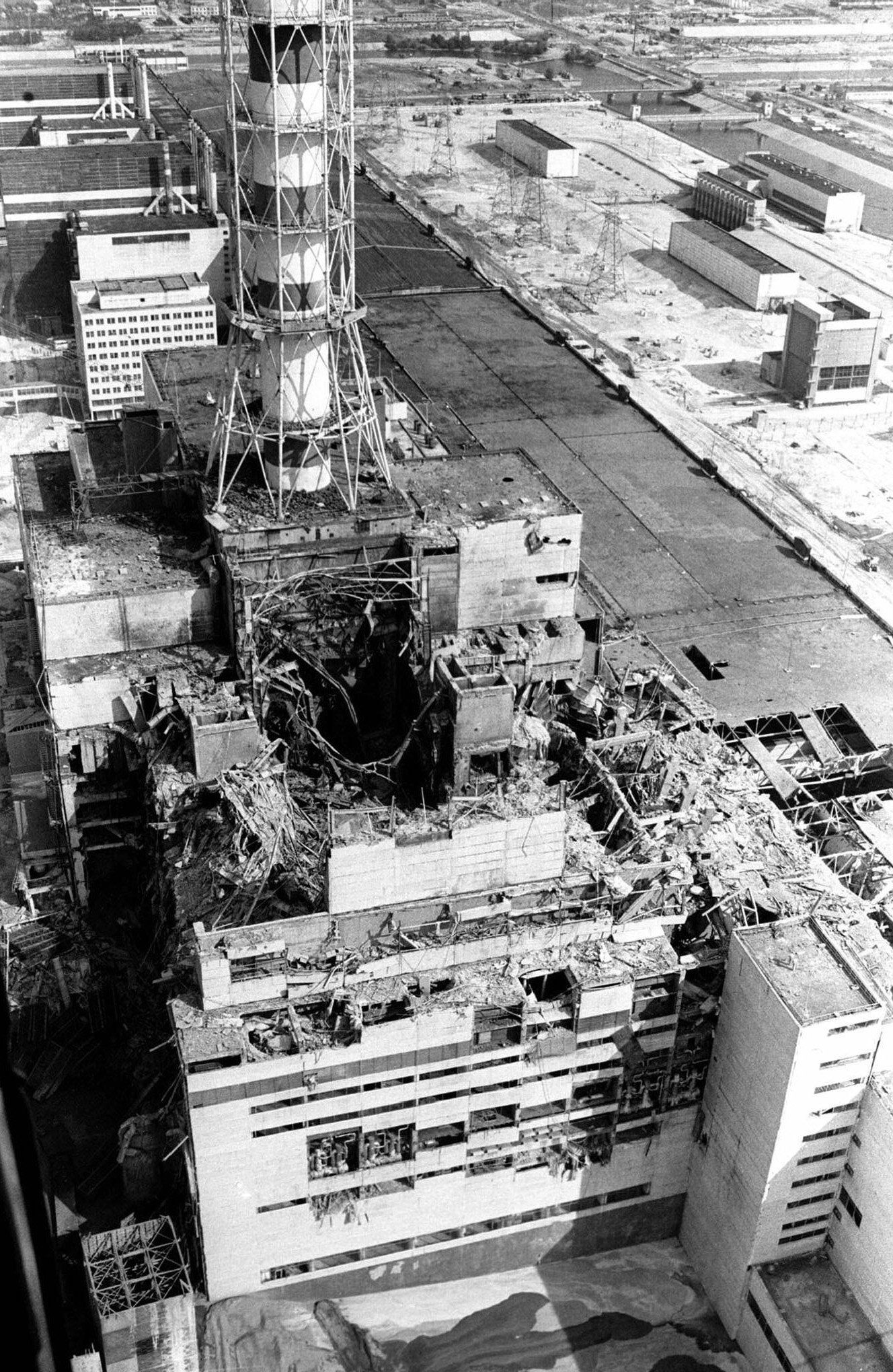
The severely damaged Reactor 4 of the Chernobyl Nuclear Power Plant several months after the disaster, prior to the construction of the first sarcophagus containment structure.

The following outline provides an overview of and topical guide to the Chernobyl disaster, a nuclear accident that occurred on 26 April 1986, when the no. 4 reactor of the Chernobyl Nuclear Power Plant, located near Pripyat, Ukrainian SSR, Soviet Union (now Ukraine), exploded during a test. The explosion and reactor core fire spread radioactive contaminants across the Soviet Union and Europe. An exclusion zone was formed around the plant, evacuating over 100,000 people primarily from the cities of Pripyat and Chernobyl. With dozens of direct casualties and potential for long term deaths and health effects, it is one of only two nuclear energy accidents rated at the maximum severity on the International Nuclear Event Scale. The response involved more than 500,000 personnel and cost an estimated 18 billion rubles (about $84.5 billion USD in 2025). It remains the worst nuclear disaster and the most expensive disaster in history, with an estimated cost of US$700 billion.

== Overview ==
- Pronunciation: Chernobyl disaster (/tʃɜːrˈnoʊbəl/ chur-NOH-bəl, UK also /tʃɜːrˈnɒbəl/ chur-NOB-əl); also known as Chornobyl disaster
- Name: Chernobyl disaster or Chernobyl nuclear accident; also Chornobyl disaster or Chornobyl nuclear accident

- Belarusian name: Чарнобыльская катастрофа, Charnobylskaya katastrofa
- Russian name: Авария на Чернобыльской АЭС, Avariya na Chernobylskoy AES
- Ukrainian name: Чорнобильська катастрофа, Chornobylska katastrofa

- Date: 26 April 1986
- Location: Chernobyl Nuclear Power Plant, Pripyat, Chernobyl Raion, Kiev Oblast, Ukrainian SSR, Soviet Union (now Chernobyl exclusion zone, Vyshhorod Raion, Kyiv Oblast, Ukraine)

== Disaster ==
- Comparison of Chernobyl and other radioactivity releases
  - Comparison of the Chernobyl and Fukushima nuclear accidents
- Effects of the Chernobyl disaster
- Chernobyl necklace
- Convention on Early Notification of a Nuclear Accident, adopted in direct response to Chernobyl
- Cultural impact of the Chernobyl disaster
- Deaths due to the Chernobyl disaster
- Individual involvement in the Chernobyl disaster
  - List of Heroes of Ukraine — liquidators of the consequences of the Chernobyl disaster
- Radiophobia
- Threat of the Dnieper reservoirs

== Russo-Ukrainian War ==
- Capture of Chernobyl

== Places and geography ==
=== Power plant ===
- Chernobyl Nuclear Power Plant
  Chernobyl Reactors 5 and 6
- Chernobyl Nuclear Power Plant sarcophagus
- Chernobyl New Safe Confinement

=== Exclusion zone ===
- Chernobyl exclusion zone, also known as the Zone of Alienation
- Pripyat, abandoned city
- Chernobyl, semi-abandoned city
- Kopachi, abandoned village
- Poliske, abandoned town
- Red Forest

=== Other ===
- Slavutych, city established in 1986 after the disaster
- Elephant's Foot (Chernobyl), an extremely radioactive lump of corium in the reactor

== Media ==
=== Non-fiction ===
- The Bell of Chernobyl, a documentary film
- Chernobyl: Chronicle of Difficult Weeks, a documentary film
- Chernobyl: Consequences of the Catastrophe for People and the Environment, a Russian scientific publication
- Chernobyl Heart, a documentary film
- Chornobyl.3828, a Ukrainian documentary film
- Mi-cro-phone!
- The Russian Woodpecker, a documentary film
- TORCH report, a scientific report
- The Truth About Chernobyl, a memoir book
- Voices from Chernobyl: The Oral History of a Nuclear Disaster, a book
- Voices from Chernobyl, a documentary film
- White Horse, a documentary film
- Chernobyl: The Lost Tapes, a 2022 documentary

=== Fiction ===
- Aurora, a 2006 film
- Call of Duty 4: Modern Warfare, a video game
- Chernobyl, a 2019 TV series
- Chernobyl, a novel by Frederik Pohl
- Chernobyl: Abyss, a 2021 Russian disaster film
- Chernobyl Diaries, a 2012 disaster horror film
- Chernobyl: Zone of Exclusion, a Russian TV series
- Chernobylite, a 2021 science fiction survival video game
- Decay, a 1990 Soviet film
- The Gateway, a 2017 film
- Lost City, a 2015 film
- Luxembourg, a film
- Stalking the Atomic City. Life among the decadent and the depraved of Chornobyl, a novel by Markiyan Kamysh about illegal trips to Chernobyl
- Swan Lake: The Zone
- The Threshold (film), a film
- S.T.A.L.K.E.R.: Shadow of Chernobyl, a 2007 video game
- S.T.A.L.K.E.R.: Clear Sky, a 2008 video game
- S.T.A.L.K.E.R.: Call of Pripyat, a 2009 video game
- S.T.A.L.K.E.R. 2: Heart of Chornobyl, a 2024 video game
- Wolves Eat Dogs, a novel by Martin Cruz Smith
- Chornobyl Liquidators, a 2024 video game

== Organizations ==
- Bellesrad
- Chernobyl Children's Project International
- Chernobyl Forum
- Chernobyl Recovery and Development Programme
- Chernobyl Shelter Fund
- Commission for Independent Research and Information on Radioactivity
- Friends of Chernobyl's Children
- List of Chernobyl-related charities
- Ukrainian National Chernobyl Museum
- Chernobyl 2000

== People ==
- Individual involvement in the Chernobyl disaster
- Aleksandr Akimov, block 4 shift leader
- Yury Bandazhevsky, Belarusian scientist who was jailed 4 years possibly because of his investigations on Chernobyl's consequences
- Viktor Bryukhanov, plant director
- Anatoly Dyatlov, plant vice chief engineer, the test supervisor
- Elena Filatova, Ukrainian photographer known for her website, containing a photo-essay of purported solo motorcycle rides through Chernobyl's zone of alienation
- Nikolai Fomin, plant chief engineer
- Vasily Ignatenko, firefighter
- Valery Khodemchuk, shift circulating pump operator
- Viktor Kibenok, firefighter shift leader
- Valery Legasov, chief of the investigation committee of the Chernobyl disaster
- Liquidator (Chernobyl), people who took part in the liquidation of the consequences of the disaster
- Vassili Nesterenko, physicist from Belarus involved as a liquidator, and working on the consequences of the Chernobyl disaster
- Vladimir Pikalov, headed the Chemical Troops of the USSR, on-scene military commander
- Volodymyr Pravyk, firefighter
- Adi Roche, chief executive of the charity Chernobyl Children International
- Boris Shcherbina, Deputy Chairman of the Council of Ministers of the USSR, supervised the crisis management
- Wladimir Tchertkoff, Journalist who made documentary films featuring the liquidators
- Leonid Telyatnikov, firefighter, head of the plant fire department
- Leonid Toptunov, shift reactor control engineer

== Other ==
- Chernobyl Way
- Chernobylite
- Children of Chernobyl Benefit Concert
- Environmental impact of nuclear power
- Nuclear power debate
- List of civilian nuclear accidents
- List of books about the Chernobyl disaster
- List of books about nuclear issues

== See also ==
- List of civilian nuclear accidents
- Timeline of nuclear accidents
- Fukushima nuclear accident
