= Deaths due to the Chernobyl disaster =

Map of radiation levels in 1996, from the CIA Factbook showing the most affected zones in Ukraine and Belarus which were confiscated or closed.

The Chernobyl disaster, considered the worst nuclear disaster in history, occurred on 26 April 1986 at the Chernobyl Nuclear Power Plant in the Ukrainian Soviet Socialist Republic, then part of the Soviet Union, now in Ukraine. From 1986 onward, the total death toll of the disaster has lacked consensus; as peer-reviewed medical journal The Lancet and other sources have noted, it remains contested. There is consensus that a total of approximately 30 people died from immediate blast trauma and acute radiation syndrome (ARS) in the seconds to months after the disaster respectively, with 60 in total in the decades since, inclusive of later radiation induced cancer. However, there is considerable debate concerning the accurate number of projected deaths that have yet to occur due to the disaster's long-term health effects; long-term death estimates range from 4,000 up to 9,000 (per the 2005 and updated 2006 conclusions of a joint consortium of the United Nations) for the most exposed people of Ukraine, Belarus, and Russia, to 16,000 cases in total for all those exposed on the entire continent of Europe, with figures as high as 60,000 when including the relatively minor effects around the globe. Such numbers are based on the heavily contested linear no-threshold model.

This no-threshold epidemiology problem is not unique to Chernobyl, and similarly hinders attempts to estimate low level radon pollution, air pollution and natural sunlight exposures. Determining the elevated risk or total number of deaths from very low doses is completely subjective, and while much higher values would be detectable, lower values are outside the statistically significant reach of empirical science and are expected to remain unknowable.

From model-based epidemiological studies, the incidence of thyroid cancer cases due to the accident by 2065 compared with other cancer-inducing sources (diet etc.) across Europe, is roughly 1 in 10,000 as a probable worst-case scenario. Thyroid cancer is relatively amenable to treatment for several decades. Attributing a 1% mortality rate by Tuttle et al. to the 16,000 cases across Europe as predicted by Cardis et al. results in a likely final total death toll from radiation-induced thyroid cancer of around 160.

There have been no validated increases in solid cancer reported from the liquidator cohorts, and observed increases in leukemia have been statistically insignificant. The liquidators were adult at exposure and the average external dose was 117 mSv.

A paper in Science has stated that there have been no transgenerational effects of radiation exposure in children born of those working as liquidators. This study used whole genome sequencing in a cohort of parent and child blood samples.

== Differing direct, short-term death toll counts ==
Initially, the Soviet Union's toll of deaths directly caused by the Chernobyl disaster included only the two Chernobyl Nuclear Power Plant workers killed in the immediate aftermath of the explosion of the plant's reactor. However, by late 1986, Soviet officials updated the official count to 30, reflecting the deaths of 28 additional plant workers and first responders in the months after the accident. In the decades since the accident, many former Soviet officials and some Western sources had also determined a total of 30 direct casualties.

For their part, some surviving evacuees of regions now included in the Chernobyl Exclusion Zone and the Polesie State Radioecological Reserve argue that the official toll of the accident's direct casualties excludes trauma and ARS deaths that they themselves claim to have witnessed in the weeks and months after the reactor explosion. In response, constituent agencies of the United Nations—including the United Nations' International Atomic Energy Agency (IAEA) and the Chernobyl Forum—discount such evacuee claims as misinformation, "urban legends", or radiophobia.

== 2005 and 2006 UN reports debate ==
At the first international conference on the Chernobyl disaster in August 1986, the IAEA established but did not make official a figure of 4,000 deaths as the total number of projected deaths caused by the accident over the long term. In 2005 and 2006, a joint group of the United Nations and the governments of Ukraine, Belarus, and Russia—acknowledging the ongoing scientific, medical, social scientific, and public questioning of the accident's death toll that had emerged over the then-20 years since the disaster—worked to establish international consensus on the effects of the accident via a series of reports that collated 20 years of research to make official previous UN, IAEA, and World Health Organization (WHO) estimates of a total 4,000 deaths due to disaster-related illnesses in "the higher-exposed Chernobyl populations".

However—as an April 2006 special report in the peer-reviewed, scientific journal Nature detailed in response—the accuracy and precision of this United Nations-led joint group's projected death toll of 4,000 were immediately contested, with several of the very scientists, physicians, and biomedical consortia whose work the joint group had cited alleging publicly that the joint group had either misrepresented their work or interpreted it out of context.

Others have also found fault with the United Nations-led joint group's findings in the years since their initial publication, arguing that the 4,000 figure is too low—including the Union of Concerned Scientists; surviving Chernobyl liquidators; evacuees of Chernobyl, Pripyat, and other areas now included in the Chernobyl Exclusion Zone and the Polesie State Radioecological Reserve; environmental groups like Greenpeace; and several of the Ukrainian and Belarusian scientists and physicians who have studied and treated relocated evacuees and liquidators over the decades since the accident.

== Liquidator mortality ==
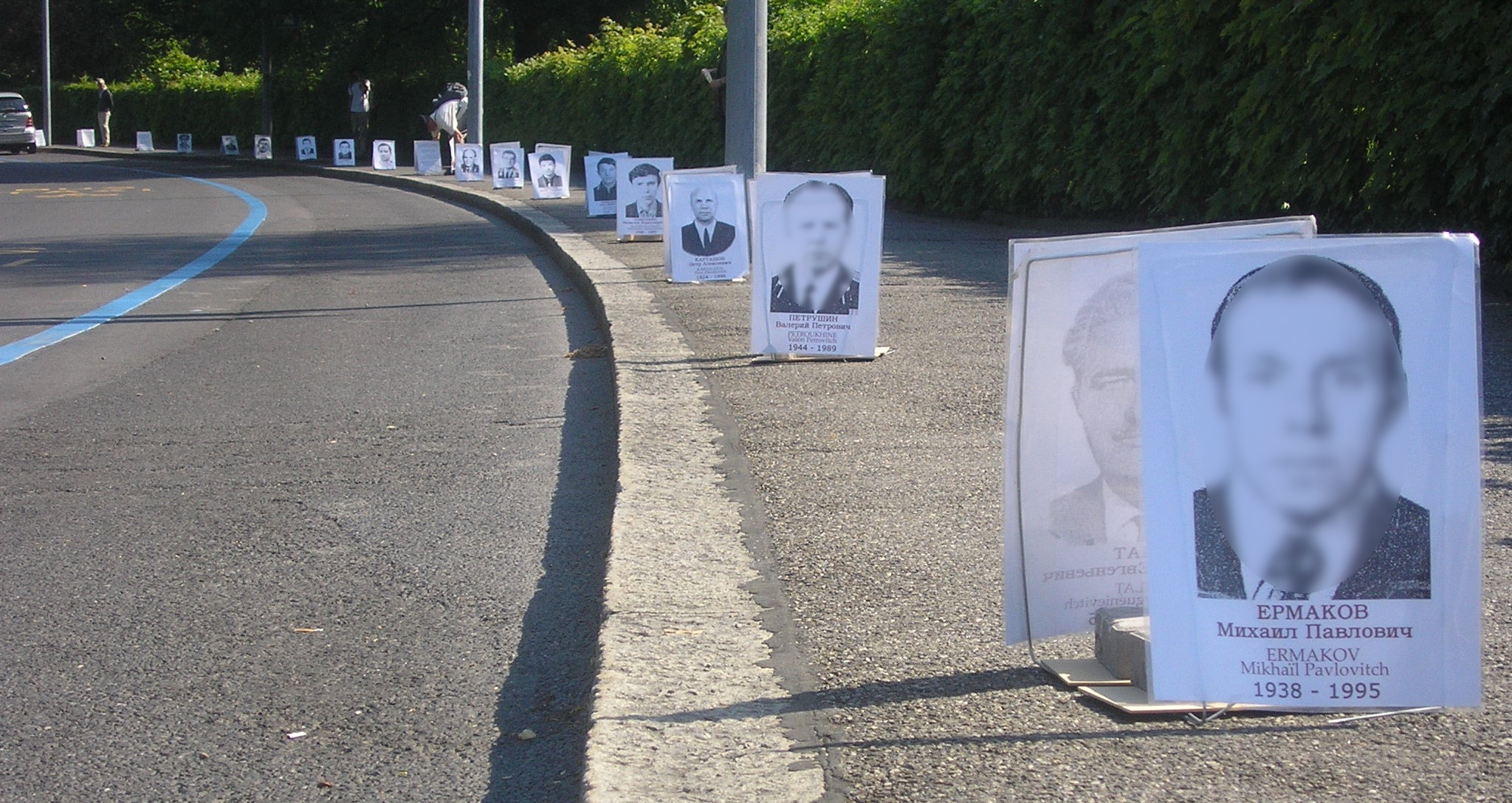
Deceased liquidators' portraits used for an anti-nuclear protest in Geneva

The uncertain and contested mortality rate of the Chernobyl liquidators is a major factor in the lack of consensus on the Chernobyl disaster's accurate death toll. Following the disaster itself, the Soviet Union organized an effort to stabilize and seal off the reactor area, still awash in radiation, using the efforts of an estimated 600,000 (Note: According to the World Health Organization, the Soviet Union issued 600,000 certificates to Chernobyl liquidators, making 600,000 the most oft-cited tally of their total numbers. However, other tallies—including published figures of 240,000, 350,000, 500,000, 750,000, and 800,000 total liquidators—often appear in secondary-source accounts of the post-disaster cleanup campaign.) "liquidators" recruited or conscripted from all over the Soviet Union.

Since the 1990s—when the declassification of selected liquidator records prompted some direct participants to speak publicly—some with direct involvement in the liquidators' cleanup efforts have asserted that several thousand liquidators died as a result of the cleanup. Other organizations claim that total liquidator deaths as a result of the cleanup operation may number at least 6,000.

The National Commission for Radiation Protection of Ukraine disputed the 6,000 estimate as much too high, maintaining that a Chernobyl-cleanup-related death toll of 6,000 would outstrip confirmed liquidator deaths from all other causes—including old age and car crashes—during the period in question. In contrast, representatives of Kyiv's National Research Centre for Radiation Medicine, the Union of Chernobyl Liquidators, and the WHO's Radiation Protection Programme argue that both the perilous conditions in which the liquidators worked and the secrecy with which the Soviet Union shrouded the highly classified disaster cleanup efforts not only preclude dismissing a liquidator death toll of 6,000, but also indicate that the 6,000 estimate might be too low.

For their part, some surviving Chernobyl liquidators have argued publicly since the declassification of additional records in the early 2000s that official records and bureaucratic assessments do not reflect the full scope of liquidators' claims of disaster-related deaths. Examples of such claims include the comments of surviving liquidators in the Prix Italia-winning 2006 documentary, The Battle of Chernobyl, as well as Valeriy Starodumov's comments in the 2011 Ukrainian documentary Chornobyl.3828, which chronicles Starodumov's, and other liquidators' work and posits its long-term effects on their lives and health.

A 26-year study on a cohort of 4,810 liquidators from Estonia indicated no definite health effects attributable to radiation.

== Long-latency diseases ==
Issues related to identifying and tracking long-latency diseases have presented another stumbling block to reaching consensus on deaths beyond the immediate fatalities directly attributable to the initial reactor explosion and subsequent ARS. In the years since the accident, delayed, post-disaster deaths due to solid cancers, leukemia, and other long-latency diseases that might be attributable to the accident's release of radioactive debris have remained an ongoing concern. However, the streamlined standards, methods, and sustained research efforts needed to pinpoint, track, and tally such long-latency disease deaths have remained lacking—resulting in gaps in data and divergent estimates. There is consensus for only one form of long-term physiological effect: thyroid cancer in those who consumed radioactive iodine as children. This is because doses of radioiodine to the child's thyroid were much higher than other isotopes and the child's thyroid is still growing. Of those in the exposed cohort who have developed thyroid cancers, the proportion of cancers attributable to the Chernobyl incident is estimated to be between 7% and 50%. As there is no bio-marker for radiation induced thyroid cancer, the exact number of cases seen in the population cannot be determined.

Addressing long-latency diseases in a widely cited 2008 report, the IAEA reaffirmed its August 1986 conclusion—initially reached at the first international conference on the accident (an event closed to the press and citizen observers) and made official in 2005 and 2006—of a projected 4,000 premature deaths as a result of the disaster. The IAEA based this 4,000 figure on its estimate of a 3% increase in cancers in the regions surrounding the plant, first adopting it at the 1986 conference after rejecting the finding of 40,000 projected deaths that Valery Legasov—inorganic chemist and a lead investigator of the Soviet Union's official Chernobyl disaster commission—had estimated based upon his team's research.

In compensation and payout legal terms, by 2005, the Ukrainian government was providing survivors' benefits to 19,000 families "owing to the loss of a breadwinner whose death was deemed to possibly related to the Chernobyl accident;" by 2019, this figure had risen to 35,000 families. By 2016, some Ukrainian and Belarusian physicians charged with treating large numbers of former liquidators in the decades since the accident were calling for more comprehensive studies and urging that the IAEA's estimated toll of disaster-related deaths from long-latency diseases be revised upwards, claiming that their own data indicates a former liquidator death rate of several thousand per year as a result of diseases related to the disaster.

Greenpeace projected up to a million excess, cancer-related deaths from the Chernobyl disaster. The Chernobyl Forum, the WHO, and other international agencies do not accept this number.

== Methodological debates ==
The use of differing, contested methods to identify and tally deaths—including anticipated deaths due to long-latency diseases—has also contributed to the wide range of estimates of the Chernobyl disaster's death toll. As former IAEA head Hans Blix has recalled in interviews, such disagreement over various tabulation methods and the divergent death tolls that they yield has been a mainstay of efforts to estimate the disaster's total fatalities since international authorities' first attempts to establish a consensus death toll.

Indeed, at the August 1986 meeting of the first international conference on the disaster, the IAEA scaled down from 40,000 to 4,000 the projected disaster-related deaths estimate of Valery Legasov—inorganic chemist and a lead investigator of the Soviet Union's official commission—after objecting to Legasov's use of a statistical model based on radiation data from the atomic bombings of Hiroshima and Nagasaki. (It is this 4,000 figure from the 1986 conference's methodological debate that the IAEA cited as its rough estimate for 20 years before joining other United Nations agencies in 2005 and 2006 to make 4,000 the UN's official estimate of disaster-related deaths.) Similarly, some theoretical estimates of the disaster's deaths are disputed on the grounds that they rely upon contested models such as the linear no-threshold model (LNT) or hormesis in order to compare the disaster's estimated cancer rates to background rates of cancer.

Yet even estimated death tolls that have acknowledged and attempted to mitigate for such methodological debates have yielded a body of divergent estimates—including the Union of Concerned Scientists' 2011, LNT-model-based conclusion of 27,000 deaths due to the accident; the death toll of 93,000 to 200,000 that Greenpeace has posited since 2006; and Chernobyl: Consequences of the Catastrophe for People and the Environment (published in 2007 by Russian affiliates of the Annals of the New York Academy of Sciences, but without NYAS' explicit approval), (Note: From "Statement on Annals of the New York Academy of Sciences volume entitled Chernobyl: Consequences of the Catastrophe for People and the Environment": "[The] Annals of the New York Academy of Sciences volume Chernobyl: Consequences of the Catastrophe for People and the Environment [...] does not present new, unpublished work, nor is it a work commissioned by the NYA. The expressed views of the authors, or by advocacy groups or individuals with specific opinions about the Annals Chernobyl volume, are their own. Although the NYAS believes it has a responsibility to provide open forums for discussion of scientific questions, the Academy has no intent to influence legislation by providing such forums. The Academy is committed to publishing content deemed scientifically valid by the general scientific community, from whom the Academy carefully monitors feedback.") which estimates 985,000 premature deaths as a result of the radioactivity the accident released.

== Surviving evacuees' accounts ==
Since 1986, officials have tended to discount as inaccurate, inexpert opinion the claims of some surviving Chernobyl Exclusion Zone and Polesie State Radioecological Reserve evacuees that their own observations of deaths attributable to the disaster are not reflected in official records and tallies. For example, authorities have long dismissed some Pripyat evacuees' claims of high death rates among fellow citizens who gathered on a railway bridge—the so-called "Bridge of Death"—to watch the exploded reactor's blazing fire and glowing, electric blue column of ionized air in the midst of visible nuclear fallout on the night of the accident as an urban legend. This particular incident has never been substantiated; journalist Adam Higginbotham interviewed one individual "who was seven or eight at the time, who did indeed cycle over to the bridge to see what he could see at the reactor, which was only three kilometers away. But he's not dead. He's apparently perfectly healthy."

Indeed, some authorities have argued that post-disaster psychological trauma—sometimes characterized as Radiophobia or labeled a mental aspect of the collection of post-accident symptoms that some physicians term "Chernobyl Syndrome"—has led some former residents of the region surrounding the plant to attribute deaths to the accident based on anecdotal evidence alone. In this vein, the Chernobyl Forum, the World Nuclear Association (WNA), and other groups posit an increase in psychological problems among those exposed to the disaster's radiation, due in part to poor communication of radiation's effects, disruption to their way of life, and trauma surrounding the dissolution of the Soviet Union.

In response, some former residents of the region that now comprises the Chernobyl Exclusion Zone and Polesie State Radioecological Reserve—including Lyubov Sirota, a Ukrainian poet and Pripyat evacuee, in her 1995 Chernobyl Poems verse, "Radiophobia", and her 2013 memoir, The Pripyat Syndrome—decry such questioning of survivors' psychology and discernment as efforts to dismiss and de-legitimize both evacuees' claimed long-term experience of the disaster's lethal impacts and evacuees' allegations of the accident's tangible, ongoing effects upon their physical health. In her 1988 poem, "They Did Not Register Us (To Vasily Deomidovich Dubodel)", Sirota addressed what she considers the failure of local and international authorities to recognize the disaster-related, long-latency disease deaths of Chernobyl Exclusion Zone evacuees and to reach consensus about how best to tally and study these deaths. She wrote:

They did not register us / and our deaths / were not linked to the accident. [...] They wrote us off as / lingering stress, / cunning genetic disorders. [...] [T]housands of 'competent' functionaries / count our 'souls' in percentages. [...] They wrote us off.

Still more controversially, some surviving Chernobyl Exclusion Zone and Polesie State Radioecological Reserve evacuees take particular issue with the longstanding position of constituent United Nations agencies to discount as misinformation, "urban legend", or radiophobia the claims of some evacuees that during the weeks and months directly after the accident, they witnessed more immediate disaster-related deaths due to trauma and radiation sickness that they argue are not reflected in the official record. For example, Nikolai Kalugin—an evacuee from a village now included in Belarus' Polesie State Radioecological Reserve—claimed to Newsweek in May 2019 that his daughter died in the weeks after the accident as the result of what he maintains were unrecorded local cases of radiation sickness:

They brought a little coffin. [...] It was small, like the box for a large doll. I want to bear witness: my daughter died from Chernobyl. And they want us to forget about it.

For their part, the United Nations and some prominent Chernobyl disaster scholars continue to discount as mistaken or radiophobic such evacuee claims of additional, short-term, direct deaths due to accident-attributable trauma or radiation sickness not counted in the official tallies of the accident's death toll.

== Official list of direct deaths ==
The 31 persons listed in the table below are those whose deaths the Soviet Union and later Ukraine included in its official roster—released in the latter half of 1986—of casualties directly attributable to the disaster. (Note: Some groups, including the UNSCEAR, posit slightly higher direct death tallies of 49, 54, or 59. (See § Differing direct, short-term death toll counts.)) The thirty-first victim, Leonid Telyatnikov, was added to the list in 2005.

Equivalent dose estimates are given in rem (Roentgen equivalent man) a CGS unit. The rem has been defined since 1976 as equal to 0.01 sievert, the more widely used SI unit. One sievert (100 rem) represents a 5.5% chance of developing lethal cancer, when applied to the general population.

Table: Known Deaths due to Trauma and Radiation Sickness
Name (Eng/Rus): Last, First, Patronym (Note: The disaster relief operation, as well as the whole work of the Chernobyl Nuclear Power Plant, was directly supervised by the Soviet government using exclusively Russian language. Directly translated into wide English use, respective names and terms may differ from their local Ukrainian or Belarusian spelling/pronunciation. Names use eastern European naming conventions.)	Date and place of birth	Date and place of death	Cause of death/injury	Occupation	Description	Official Recognition	Original 1988 equivalent dose estimates	New 2014 revised equivalent dose estimates
Akimov, Aleksandr Fyodorovich; Акимов, Александр Фёдорович	1953-05-06, Novosibirsk	1986-05-10, Moscow	ARS of the 4th degree; burns on 100% of body. Parts of his skin received as much as 400-500Gy of radiation. Skin and intestinal injuries.	Unit #4 Shift Supervisor	The shift supervisor, in the control room at the time of the explosion; received fatal dose during attempts to restart feedwater flow into the reactor in room 714/2 along with Toptunov, Nekhaev, Uskov and Orlov.	Ukraine's Order For Courage of third degree	1300 rem	Unknown
Baranov, Anatoly Ivanovich; Баранов, Анатолий Иванович	1953-06-13, Tsyurupynsk, Kherson, Ukrainian SSR	1986-05-20, Moscow	ARS of the 4th degree, lung injuries.	Senior electrical engineer	Managed generators during emergency, preventing fire spread through the generator hall.	Ukraine's Order For Courage of third degree; Soviet Union's Order of the October Revolution	830-1030 rem.	940-1140 rem.
Brazhnik, Vyacheslav Stepanovych; Бражник, Вячеслав Степанович	1957-05-03, Atbasar, Tselinograd, Kazakh SSR	1986-05-14, Moscow	ARS of the 4th degree. Skin and intestinal injuries.	Senior turbine machinist operator	In the turbine hall at the moment of explosion. Received fatal dose (over 1000 rad) during firefighting and stabilizing the turbine hall, died in Moscow hospital. Irradiated by a piece of fuel lodged on a nearby transformer of turbogenerator 7 during manual opening of the turbine emergency oil drain valves.	Ukraine's Order For Courage of third degree; Soviet Union's Order of the Badge of Honor.	990-1190 rem.	1120-1320 rem.
Degtyarenko, Viktor Mykhaylovych; Дегтяренко, Виктор Михайлович	1954-08-10, Ryazan, Russian SFSR	1986-05-19, Moscow	ARS of the 3rd degree; thermal and radiation burns.	Reactor operator	Close to the pumps at the moment of explosion; face scalded by steam or hot water.	Ukraine's Order For Courage of third degree; Soviet Union's Order of the Badge of Honor.	320-420 rem.	390-490 rem.
Ignatenko, Vasily Ivanovych; Игнатенко, Василий Иванович	1961-03-13, Sperizhe, Gomel, Byelorussian SSR	1986-05-13, Moscow	ARS of the 4th degree. Skin and intestinal injuries.	Firefighter, 6th Paramilitary Fire Department, Pripyat, Kyiv	A fireman from the Pripyat Fire Department (SWPCH-6/ СВПЧ-6). Arrived on scene at 1:35 AM under the command of Lieutenant Viktor Kibenok. He was the first man from his squad to reach the roof of reactor 3. Assisted in fire extinguishing efforts on the roof of the ventilation block and successfully prevented the fire from spreading to reactor 3. He carried two of his comrades down from the roof, despite being weakened by the radiation himself. Died in Moscow Hospital No.6, 17 days later.	Hero of Ukraine with Order of the Gold Star; Cross for Courage; The Soviet Union's Order of the Red Banner.	1100-1300 rem.	1240-1440 rem.
Ivanenko, Yekaterina Alexandrovna; Иваненко, Екатерина Александровна	1932-09-11, Nezhihov, Gomel, Byelorussian SSR	1986-05-26, Moscow	ARS of the 4th degree. Toxicity and respiratory insufficiency.	Security guard	Guarded a gate opposite to the Block 4, stayed on duty for the entire night until morning, radioactive debris rained down upon her resulting in a fatal dose.	Soviet Union's Order of the Red Banner.	730-930 rem.	840-1040 rem.
Khodemchuk, Valery Ilyich; Ходемчук, Валерій Ілліч	1951-03-24, Krapyvnya, Ivankov, Kyiv, Ukrainian SSR	1986-04-26, Chernobyl NPP	unknown, likely explosion trauma	Senior operator, Main circulating pump, reactor 4	Stationed in the southern main circulating pumps engine room, likely killed immediately; body never found, likely buried under the wreckage of the steam separator drums. Has a memorial sign in the Reactor 4 building.	Ukraine's Order For Courage of third degree.	Died instantly.	Died instantly.
Kibenok, Viktor Mykolayovych; Кібенок, Віктор Миколайович	1963-02-17, Sirohozskoho, Kherson, Ukrainian SSR	1986-05-11, Moscow	ARS of the 4th degree, skin and lung injuries.	Firefighter, 6th Paramilitary Fire Department, Pripyat, Kyiv	Lieutenant, shift leader from the Pripyat Fire Department. Arrived on scene at 1:35 AM, along with Lieutenant Pravyk, coordinated firefighting deployments on the north side of the reactor building. Climbed to the roof of unit 3 at 2:05 AM after Pravyk reported over the radio that there had been an explosion in the reactor compartment. He received a fatal dose of radiation whilst assisting and coordinating firefighting efforts on the roofs of the ventilation block and reactor 3. Died two weeks later. Posthumously became a Hero of the Soviet Union.	Soviet Union's Hero of the Soviet Union and the Order of Lenin, by decree of the Presidium of the Supreme Soviet of the USSR on September 25, 1986.	820-1020 rem.	900-1100 rem.
Konoval, Yuriy Ivanovych; Коновал, Юрий Иванович	1942-01-01, Ust-Pier, Altai ASSR	1986-05-28, Moscow	ARS of the 4th degree; respiratory insufficiency and cerebral oedema.	Electrician	Managed machinery and fought fires in the 4th and 5th block receiving a fatal dose in the process.	Ukraine's Order For Courage of third degree; Soviet Union's Badge of Honor.	570-770 rem.	670-870 rem.
Kudryavtsev, Aleksandr Gennadiyevych; Кудрявцев, Александр Геннадиевич	1957-12-11, Kirov, Russian SSR	1986-05-14, Moscow	ARS of the 3rd degree; 100% radiation burns. Died from skin injuries and post transfusion shock.	Reactor control chief engineer candidate	Present in the control room at the moment of explosion; received fatal dose of radiation during attempt to enter the hall to manually lower the control rods and attempting to restart feedwater flow.	Ukraine's Order For Courage of third degree.	420-520 rem.	500-600 rem.
Kurguz, Anatoly Kharlampiyovych; Кургуз, Анатолий Харлампиевич	1957-06-12, Unechskoho, Bryansk, Russian SSR	1986-05-12, Moscow	ARS of the 3rd degree. Thermal and radiation burn.	Senior reactor operator, central hall	Scalded by radioactive steam entering his control room at the epicenter of the explosion, he helped rescue personnel; his colleague, Oleg Genrikh, survived.	USSR's Order of Lenin; Ukraine's Cross for Courage.	520-620 rem.	550-650 rem.
Lelechenko, Aleksandr Grigoryevich; Лелеченко, Александр Григорьевич	1938-07-26, Lubensky, Poltava, Ukrainian SSR	1986-05-06, Kyiv, Ukrainian SSR	ARS of the 4th degree; parts of his skin received as much as 500Gy. Skin and intestinal injuries, first to perish due to ARS.	Deputy chief of the electrical shop	Former Leningrad power plant electrical shop shift leader at the central control room with Kukhar; at the moment of explosion just arrived to the block 4 control room; in order to spare his younger colleagues from radiation exposure, he went through radioactive water and debris three times to switch off the electrolyzers and the feed of hydrogen to the generators, then tried to supply voltage to the feedwater pumps receiving a beyond fatal dose of more than 1,000 rad.	USSR's Order of Lenin, the title of Hero of Ukraine on awarding of the Order of the Gold Star; Ukraine's Cross for Courage.	920-1120 rem.	1080-1280 rem.
Lopatyuk, Viktor Ivanovich; Лопатюк, Виктор Иванович	1960-08-22, Lilov, Kyiv, Ukrainian SSR	1986-05-17, Moscow	ARS of the 3rd degree; died from bleeding through mechanical injury during attempted catheterisation.	Electrician	Received a fatal dose (more than 500 rad) while switching off the electrolyzer.	USSR's Order of Lenin; Ukraine's Cross for Courage.	500-600 rem.	590-690 rem.
Luzganova, Klavdia Ivanovna; Лузганова, Клавдия Ивановна	1927-05-09	1986-07-31, Moscow	ARS of the 2nd degree. Last death from ARS 96 days after the accident due to infection, renal-hepatic insufficiency skin injuries and cerebral edema.	Security guard	Guarded the construction site of the spent fuel storage building about 200 meters from Block 4, where a fuel fragment ejected from the core landed nearby, irradiating her with more than 400 rad.	Soviet Union's Order of the Red Banner.	360-460 rem.	440-540 rem.
Novyk, Aleksandr Vasylyovych; Новик, Александр Васильевич	1961-08-11, Dubrovytsky, Rivne, Ukrainian SSR	1986-07-26, Moscow	ARS of the 4th degree; Infection and graft versus host disease.	Turbine equipment machinist-inspector	Received fatal dose (over 10 grays (1,000 rad)) during firefighting and stabilizing the turbine hall. Irradiated by a piece of fuel lodged on a nearby transformer of the turbo-generator 7 during attempts to call the control room.	Ukraine's Order For Courage of third degree	910-1110 rem.	1030-1230 rem.
Orlov, Ivan Lukych; Орлов, Иван Лукич	1945-01-10	1986-05-13	ARS of the 4th degree. Died from skin and intestinal injuries.	Employee of "Chernobylenergozashita"	Received a fatal dose of more than 1,200 rad from core fragments that landed around the Unit 5 warehouses and construction staging area.		1140-1340 rem.	1280-1480 rem.
Perchuk, Kostyantyn Grigorovich; Перчук, Константин Григорьевич	1952-11-23, Magadan, Kolyma, Russian SSR	1986-05-20, Moscow	ARS of the 4th degree; succumbed to fatal lung injuries.	Turbine operator, senior engineer	In the turbine hall at the moment of explosion; received fatal dose (over 10 grays (1,000 rad)) during firefighting and stabilizing the turbine hall. Irradiated by a piece of fuel lodged on a nearby transformer of the turbo-generator 7 during manual opening of the turbine emergency oil drain valves.	Ukraine's Order For Courage of third degree;	730-930 rem.	830-1030 rem.
Perevozchenko, Valery Ivanovich; Перевозченко, Валерий Иванович	1947-05-06, Starodub, Bryansk, Russian SSR	1986-06-13, Moscow	ARS of the 3rd degree. Infection and graft versus host disease following bone marrow transplant.	Foreman, reactor section	Received fatal dose of more than 600 rad during attempt to locate and rescue Khodemchuk and others, manually lower the control rods together with Kudryavtsev and Proskuryakov in the reactor hall and attempting to restart feedwater flow to the reactor. Consequently, suffering radiation burns on side and back. Made extra efforts to save fellow crew.	Ukraine's Order For Courage of third degree.	540-740 rem.	630-830 rem.
Popov, Georgi Illarionovich; Попов, Георгий Илларионович	1940-02-21	1986-06-13	ARS of the 3rd degree; lung injuries, respiratory insufficiency and cerebral oedema.	Employee of the Kharkiv "Turboatom" plant (a NPP subcontractor)	Vibration specialist, mobile truck-based laboratory at Turbine 8; assisted in holding the turbine room fires in check where he received a fatal dose (over 500 rad).		530-630 rem.	620-720 rem.
Pravyk, Volodymyr Pavlovych; Правик, Володимир Павлович	1962-06-13, Chernobyl, Kyiv, Ukrainian SSR	1986-05-11, Moscow	ARS of the 4th degree; skin and intestinal injuries.	Firefighter, 2nd Militarized Fire Department, Chernobyl NPP	Lieutenant, Shift leader of the nuclear plant's fire station. Commanded the first unit to arrive at 1:28. He called a stage 3 alert immediately upon seeing the destroyed reactor building. Held scene command until 2:00 AM. Coordinated firefighting efforts on the roof of the ventilation block, successfully preventing the spread of fire to reactor 3's roof. Likely the first person to look into the reactor core from the roof. Descended from the roof at 2:30 AM but had already received a lethal dose of radiation. Died two weeks later in Moscow Hospital No.6. Posthumously named a Hero of the Soviet Union. He received the highest dose of radiation out of everyone present during disaster.	Named a Hero of the Soviet Union with the awarding of the Order of Lenin, by decree of the Presidium of the Supreme Soviet of the USSR on September 25, 1986.	1270-1470 rem.	1420-1620 rem.
Proskuryakov, Viktor Vasilyevich; Проскуряков, Виктор Васильович	1955-04-09, Svobodnyj, Amur, Russian SSR	1986-05-17, Moscow	ARS of the 4th degree; combined 100% radiation burns. Died due to skin injuries (radiation burns).	Reactor Control Chief Engineer candidate	Present in the control room at the moment of explosion; received fatal dose of radiation (over 600 rad) during attempt to manually lower the control rods and restart feedwater flow, he suffered 100% radiation burns.	Ukraine's Order For Courage of third degree; Soviet Union's Order of Courage.	560-660 rem.	650-750 rem.
Savenkov, Vladimir Ivanovych; Савенков, Владимир Иванович	1958-02-15	1986-05-21	ARS of the 4th degree; Toxicity and respiratory insufficiency.	Employee of the Kharkiv "Turboatom" plant (a NPP subcontractor)	Vibration specialist, mobile truck-based laboratory at Turbine 8 where he received a fatal dose (over 650 rad). First patient admitted to Moscow hospital; case number 1. Buried in Kharkiv in a lead coffin.		610-710 rem.	700-800 rem.
Shapovalov, Anatoliy Ivanovych; Шаповалов, Анатолий Иванович	1941-04-06, Kirovograd, Ukrainian SSR	1986-05-19, Moscow	ARS of the 4th degree, combined skin and lung injuries.	Electrician	Fought fires and managed electrical equipment where he received more than 1,000 rad.	Ukraine's Order For Courage of third degree; USSR's Order of Friendship of Peoples.	820-1020 rem.	970-1170 rem.
Shashenok, Vladimir Nikolaevich; Шашенок, Владимир Николаевич	1951-04-21, Schucha Dam, Chernihiv, Ukrainian SSR	1986-04-26, Pripyat	thermal and radiation burns, trauma	Employee of the "Atomenergonaladka" (Chernobyl startup and adjustment company, a NPP subcontractor), adjuster of automatic systems	Stationed in Room 604, found unconscious and pinned down under a fallen beam, with broken spine, broken ribs, deep thermal and radiation burns. He died in the hospital without regaining consciousness.	Ukraine's Order For Courage of third degree; USSR's Order of Courage.	Unknown, died of other injuries.	Unknown, died of other injuries.
Sitnikov, Anatoly Andreyevich; Ситников, Анатолий Андреевич	1940-01-20, Voskresenka, Primorye, Russian SSR	1986-05-30, Moscow	ARS of the 3rd degree, failed bone marrow transplant resulted in immunosuppression combined with fatal infection.	Deputy chief operational engineer, physicist	Received fatal dose (over 450 rad) while surveying the damage to Unit 4 and assisting with the coolant supply efforts.	USSR's Order of Lenin; Ukraine's Cross for Courage.	390-490 rem.	470-570 rem.
Telyatnikov, Leonid Petrovich; Телятніков, Леонід Петрович	1951-01-25, Vvedenka, Kustanai, Kazakh SSR	2004-12-02, Kyiv	Died of cancer 18 years after the accident. Suffered ARS of the 2nd degree receiving an estimated 4–6 grays (400–600 rad) dose.	Firefighter, 2nd Militarized Fire Department, Chernobyl NPP	Major. Commanding officer of the nuclear plant's fire station (ВПЧ-2). He was on vacation at the time of the disaster and arrived at 1:47 AM. Took over scene command from Lieutenant Pravyk and began his reconnaissance inside the plant. He held overall scene command until 4 AM, when he could no longer continue due to the onset symptoms of ARS. He received an estimated 450 REM dose, recovered from his treatment, and was named a Hero of the USSR in September 1986. Died from jaw cancer in December 2004, which was almost certainly caused by his radiation poisoning from the accident. Telyatnikov is the only "official victim" who did not die of ARS or of injuries on April 26th, although there are certainly others like him.	Hero of the Soviet Union with the awarding the Order of Lenin by decree of the Presidium of the Supreme Soviet of the USSR on September 25, 1986; Ukraine's Cross for Courage.	200-400 rem.	450-520 rem.
Tishura, Vladimir Ivanovych; Тишура, Владимир Иванович	1959-12-15, North Station, Leningrad, Russian SSR	1986-05-10, Moscow	ARS of the 4th degree; skin and intestinal injuries.	Firefighter, 6th Paramilitary Fire Department, Pripyat, Kyiv	A fireman from the Pripyat Fire Department (SWPCH-6/ СВПЧ-6). Arrived on scene at 1:35 AM under the command of Lieutenant Viktor Kibenok. Assisted in fire extinguishing efforts on the roof of the ventilation block and successfully prevented the fire from spreading to reactor 3. He was the first to collapse and had to be assisted down from the roof by his comrade Vasily Ignatenko. He died in Moscow Hospital No.6 two weeks later, being the first fireman to die. He was posthumously named a Hero of Ukraine in 2006.	Hero of Ukraine on awarding the Order of the Gold Star; Ukraine's Cross for Courage; USSR's Order of Red Banner.	1010-1210 rem.	1140-1340 rem.
Tytenok, Mykola Ivanovych; Титенок, Микола Іванович	1962-12-05, Vilcha, Kyiv, Ukrainian SSR	1986-05-16, Moscow	ARS of the 4th degree, combined with external and internal radiation burns, blistered heart and intestinal damage.	Firefighter, 6th Paramilitary Fire Department, Pripyat, Kyiv	A fireman from the Pripyat Fire Department (SWPCH-6/ СВПЧ-6). Arrived on scene at 1:35 AM under the command of Lieutenant Viktor Kibenok. Assisted in fire extinguishing efforts on the roof of the ventilation block and successfully prevented the fire from spreading to reactor 3. He was the second fireman in his squad to collapse and had to be assisted down from the roof in his weakened state. He died two weeks later in Moscow Hospital No.6 after receiving an estimated 1300-1500 REM dose. He was the last fireman to die from ARS, and was posthumously named a Hero of Ukraine in 2006.	Hero of Ukraine on awarding the Order of the Gold Star; Ukraine's Cross for Courage; USSR's Order of Red Banner.	1150-1350 rem.	1300-1500 rem.
Toptunov, Leonid Fedorovych; Топтунов, Леонід Федорович	1960-08-16, Mykolaivka, Burinskiy, Sumy, Ukrainian SSR	1986-05-14, Moscow	ARS of the 4th degree; skin and intestinal injuries, radiation burns to 90% of his body.	Senior reactor control chief engineer	In the control room at the reactor control panel at the moment of explosion, with Akimov; received fatal dose of more than 1,000 rad during attempts to restart feedwater flow into the reactor.	Ukraine's Order For Courage of the third degree.	900–1,100 rem.	950–1,150 rem.
Vashchuk, Nikolai Vasilievich; Ващук, Николай Васильевич	1959-06-05, Zhitomir, Ukrainian SSR	1986-05-14, Moscow	ARS of the 4th degree; combined skin and intestinal injuries.	Firefighter, 6th Paramilitary Fire Department, Pripyat, Kyiv	A fireman from the Pripyat Fire Department (SWPCH-6/ СВПЧ-6). Arrived on scene at 1:35 AM under the command of Lieutenant Viktor Kibenok. Assisted in fire extinguishing efforts on the roof of the ventilation block and successfully prevented the fire from spreading to reactor 3. He notably ran hose lines to and from the roof multiple times. He received an estimated 1220 - 1420 REM dose and died two weeks later in Moscow Hospital No.6. He was posthumously named a Hero of Ukraine in 2006.	Hero of Ukraine with the Order of the Gold Star.	1080-1280 rem.	1220-1420 rem.
Vershynin, Yuriy Anatoliyovych; Вершинин, Юрий Анатольевич	1959-05-22, Zuyevskaya, Kirov, Russian SSR	1986-07-21, Moscow	ARS of the 4th degree. Developed fatal infections following failed bone marrow transplant.	Turbine equipment machinist-inspector	In the turbine hall at the moment of explosion; received over 7 Gy (700 rad) dose during firefighting and stabilizing the turbine hall. Irradiated by a piece of fuel lodged on a nearby transformer of the turbogenerator 7 during attempts to call the control room.	Ukraine's Order For Courage of third degree; Soviet Union's Order of the Badge of Honor.	650-850 rem.	750-950 rem.

== See also ==
- Chernobyl: Consequences of the Catastrophe for People and the Environment
- Individual involvement in the Chernobyl disaster
