= List of books about the Chernobyl disaster =

Continuing list of books about the Chernobyl meltdown

This is an incomplete list of books about the Chernobyl nuclear disaster. Soon after the events of Chernobyl on April 26, 1986 generated global attention, numerous fiction and non-fiction titles have been published on the subject. Very early examples included a 1987 fiction book by science-fiction author Frederik Pohl, titled Chernobyl, while many famous non-fiction titles about Chernobyl were unwritten and unpublished until the fall of the Soviet Union in 1991.

This list is not exhaustive and may not reflect all books, including recently-published, pre-released and self-published books.

== Non-fiction ==
- Biohazard (1999) by Ken Alibek (discusses Chernobyl and the 1979 Sverdlovsk anthrax leak as two of many accidents that happened involving hazardous substances in the Soviet Union).
- Midnight in Chernobyl (2019) by Adam Higginbotham (reexamines the disaster using up-to-date reports and historical archives).
- Out of Chernobyl: A Girl Named Olga (2008) by Maureen A. White (memoir about raising a Chernobyl survivor named Olga, a young girl who immigrated to Canada and attended school in the province of Nova Scotia).
- The Truth About Chernobyl (1991) by Grigori Medvedev (first-hand testimony about the disaster; Medvedev worked at the Chernobyl Nuclear Power Plant and witnessed the accident).
- Voices from Chernobyl (1997) by Svetlana Alexievich (relates the psychological and personal tragedy of the Chernobyl accident, and explores the experiences of individuals and how the disaster affected their lives; was also part of the inspiration for the 2019 HBO TV miniseries Chernobyl.

== Fiction ==
- Chernobyl (1987) by Frederik Pohl (fictional version of the disaster, based heavily on the true events as known at the time; Chernobyl was one of the first fiction titles to be published on the Chernobyl disaster).
- Wolves Eat Dogs (2004) by Martin Cruz Smith (crime novel featuring characters affected by the events of the Chernobyl disaster, written as a murder mystery ending on an ambiguous note; the book discusses effects of radiation poisoning on ordinary people, including infertility).

== See also ==
- List of Chernobyl-related articles
- List of books about nuclear issues
