= Chernobyl (disambiguation) =

Chernobyl is a Ukrainian city, where a decommissioning nuclear power plant located nearby.

Chernobyl may also refer to:

- Chernobyl Nuclear Power Plant, Ukraine
- Chernobyl disaster, a 1986 nuclear disaster happened in the power plant nearby
- Chernobyl (Hasidic dynasty), which was named after the city
- CIH (computer virus), also known as Chernobyl

== Media ==
- Chernobyl: Abyss, a 2021 Russian disaster film directed by and starring Danila Kozlovsky
- Chernobyl: Consequences of the Catastrophe for People and the Environment, a 2007 book by Alexey V. Yablokov, Vassily B. Nesterenko, and Alexey V. Nesterenko
- Chernobyl (miniseries), a 2019 American–British television series
- Chernobyl (novel), novel by Frederik Pohl dramatizing the disaster
- Chernobyl: The Final Warning, 1991 American drama film
- Chernobyl: Zone of Exclusion, a 2014–2017 Russian television series

== See also ==
- Artemisia vulgaris, the common mugwort plant, for which the Ukrainian city is named
