= Chernobyl: Consequences of the Catastrophe for People and the Environment =

2007 book

- Author: Alexey V. Yablokov; Vassily B. Nesterenko; Alexey V. Nesterenko
- Series: Annals of the New York Academy of Sciences, v. 1181.
- Subject: Chernobyl disaster
- Publisher: Blackwell Publishing
- Publication date: 2007
- English publication date: 2009
- ISBN: 978-1-57331-757-3
- OCLC: 456185565

Chernobyl: Consequences of the Catastrophe for People and the Environment is a translation of a 2007 Russian publication by Alexey V. Yablokov, Vassily B. Nesterenko, and Alexey V. Nesterenko, edited by Janette D. Sherman-Nevinger, and originally published by the New York Academy of Sciences in 2009 in their Annals of the New York Academy of Sciences series.

The book was not peer reviewed by the New York Academy of Sciences. Five reviews were published in the academic press, with four of them considering the book severely flawed and contradictory, and one praising it while noting some shortcomings.

The book presents an analysis of scientific literature and concludes that medical records between 1986, the year of the Chernobyl disaster, and 2004 reflect 985,000 premature deaths as a result of the radioactivity released. The literature analysis draws on over 1,000 published titles and over 5,000 internet and printed publications, primarily in Slavic languages (i.e. not translated in English), discussing the consequences of the Chernobyl disaster. However, reviewers noted that the sources given are difficult to verify due to the use of non-standard abbreviations and inadequate explanations, the ignoring of well respected Slavic-language peer reviewed work on the topic, and the use of non-peer reviewed sources such as mass media and internet publications.

The primary author, the biologist Alexey V. Yablokov, was a member of the Russian Academy of Science. Consulting editor, Janette Sherman, MD, has researched the health effects of nuclear radiation and illnesses such as cancer and birth defects.

== Authors ==
The primary author, the late biologist Alexey V. Yablokov, was a member of the Russian Academy of Science, and was deputy chair of the commission of ecology of the USSR' Parliament (1989-1991), councillor on ecology and public health to the President of the Russian Federation (1991-1993) and chair of the state commission on dumping of radioactive wastes in seas surrounding the Russian Federation (1992-1993). He is also a co-founder of Greenpeace Russia. From 1977 to 1987, the late Prof. Vassily B. Nesterenko was the director of the Institute of Nuclear Energy at the National Academy of Sciences of Belarus. The foreword of the book is authored by Dimitro M. Grodzinsky, chairman of the Ukrainian National Commission on Radiation Protection and chairman of the Department of General Biology at the Ukrainian National Academy of Sciences. Consulting editor, Janette Sherman, MD, has a background in medicine and toxicology, with special reference to the health effects of nuclear radiation and illnesses such as cancer and birth defects.

== Themes ==
The book presents an analysis of scientific literature and concludes that medical records between 1986, the year of the Chernobyl disaster, and 2004 reflect 985,000 premature deaths as a result of the radioactivity released. The authors suggest that most of the deaths were in Russia, Belarus and Ukraine, though others occurred worldwide throughout the many countries that were struck by radioactive fallout from Chernobyl. The literature analysis draws on over 1,000 published titles and over 5,000 internet and printed publications, primarily in Slavic languages (i.e. not translated in English), discussing the consequences of the Chernobyl disaster. The authors contend that those publications and papers were written by leading Eastern European authorities and have largely been downplayed or ignored by the IAEA and UNSCEAR. The claim was made, notwithstanding the fact that 13 of the authors of the Chernobyl Forum were from Ukraine, Russia or Belarus.

== Reviews ==
The book was not peer reviewed by the New York Academy of Sciences. Five reviews were published in the academic press, with four of them considering the book severely flawed and contradictory, and one praising it while noting some shortcomings.

=== Positive ===
Expert reviews of the book were commissioned by the Oxford journal Radiation Protection Dosimetry. The first, by Ian Fairlie, generally endorses the book's conclusions. Fairlie, a radiation biologist, was a scientific secretary to UK Government’s Committee Examining Radiation Risks from Internal Emitters and one of two authors of the TORCH report commissioned by the European Green Party. He greets the book as a

... welcome addition to the literature in English. The New York Academy of Sciences [is] to be congratulated for publishing this volume. [...] In the opinion of the reviewer, this volume makes it clear that international nuclear agencies and some national authorities remain in denial about the scale of the health disasters in their countries due to Chernobyl's fallout. This is shown by their reluctance to acknowledge contamination and health outcomes data, their ascribing observed morbidity/mortality increases to non-radiation causes, and their refusal to devote resources to rehabilitation and disaster management.

Fairlie notes two shortcomings of the book: that it does not sufficiently investigate the large decrease in average male life spans throughout Belarus, Russia and Ukraine, in both contaminated and uncontaminated areas; and that it does not make enough effort to reconstruct estimated doses of contamination and discuss their implications for eastern and western Europe (though Fairlie agrees with the authors that studies should not be rejected for failing to contain dose estimates—a criterion commonly applied by western nuclear agencies such as the IAEA).

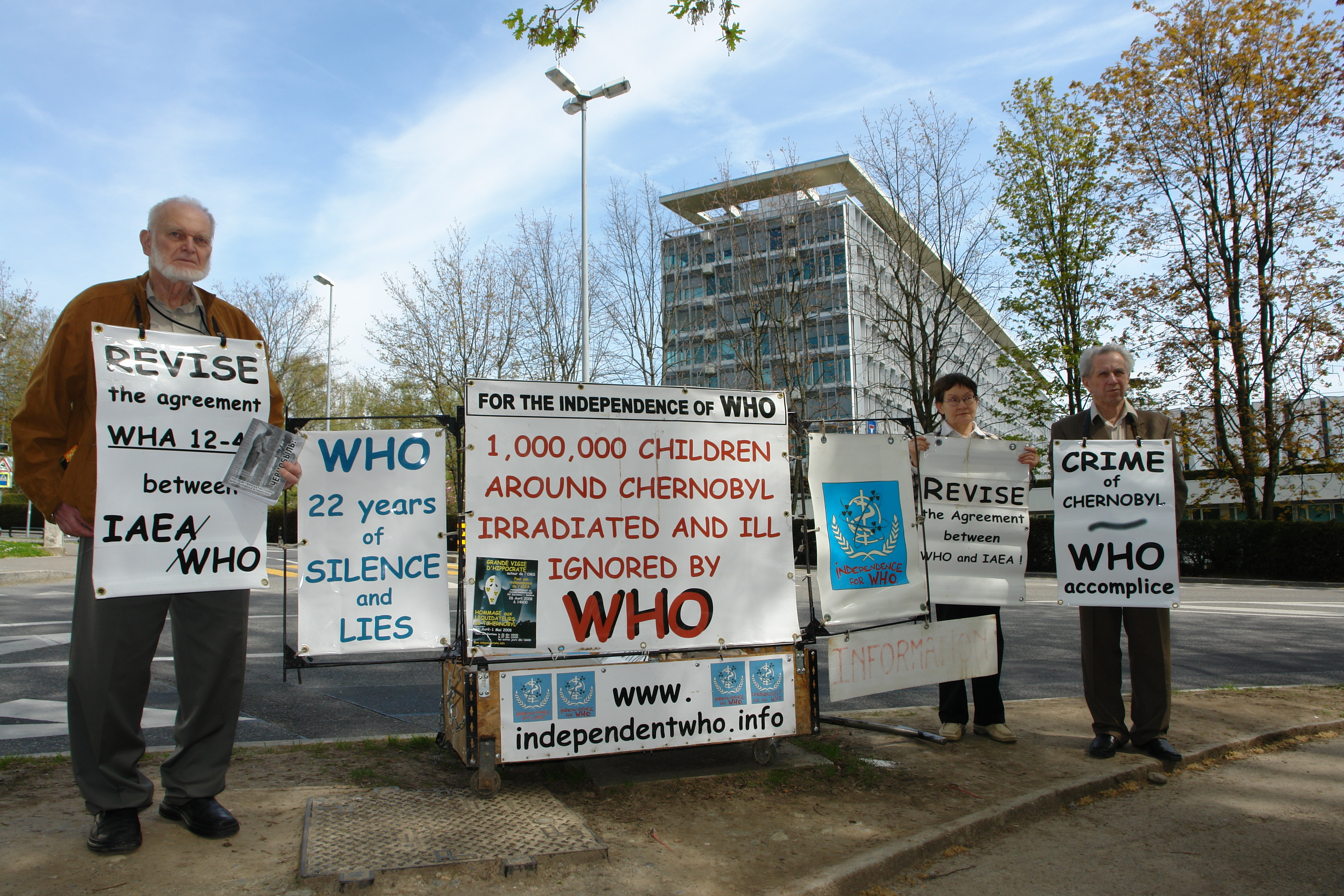
Yablokov (left) and Vassili Nesterenko (farthest right) protesting in front of the World Health Organization (WHO) headquarters in Geneva, Switzerland in 2008.

Fairlie specifically concurs with Yablakov et al. on three points:

- The IAEA's exclusion of data where estimated dose is below a certain threshold (following ICRP recommendations) is contrary to normal practice, even the ICRP's own practice, and contradicts the linear no-threshold model (LNT). The ICRP's recommendation in this regard is inconsistent with LNT and its own practices.
- The IAEA/WHO have often sought to justify their dismissal of eastern European epidemiological studies by citing questionable scientific practices: but epidemiology is not an exact science, and the same shortcomings exist in western studies uncriticised by the IAEA. The IAEA also point to shortcomings with pre-Chernobyl Soviet cancer registries, but cancer registries in western countries had similar issues at that time.
- In observational epidemiological studies where certain data are already known and certain effects are expected, statistical tests for significance of the results are not normally required. Yet the IAEA has challenged such papers that do not include statistical tests and confidence intervals, and questioned whether the observed effects are due to chance. Eastern scientists are faced with a catch-22 situation whereby they either leave out statistical tests, and are dismissed, or else apply the tests, leading western scientists to conclude that there is no real effect.

=== Negative ===
The second review (in the same volume of Radiation Protection Dosimetry), by Monty Charles, is largely critical, noting several problems:

- The authors expressly discount socioeconomic or screening factors when considering increased occurrence of diseases, but this methodology does not seem to account for variations between territories prior to the accident.
- Their discussion of 'hot particle' poisoning is cursory, and is unclear regarding dosage figures.
- The chapter on health effects, 60% of the book, contains inadequate explanation or critical evaluation of many cited facts and figures, and in many instances related tables, figures and statements appear to contradict each other.
- A section abstract predicted numbers of casualties due to cancer, however the section did not contain any discussion to support these numbers.

While Charles agrees with the importance of making eastern research more available in the west, he states that he cannot tell which of the publications referred to by the book would sustain critical peer-review in western scientific literature, and that verifying these sources would require considerable effort. Charles sees the book as representing one end of a spectrum of views, and believes that works from the entire spectrum must be critically evaluated in order to develop an informed opinion.

A third review by Mona Dreicer was published in the journal Environmental Health Perspectives. It was highly critical of the book's methodology:

... by discounting the widely accepted scientific method for associating cause and effect (while taking into account the uncertainties of dose assessment and measurement of impacts), the authors leave us with only with their assertion that the data in this volume "document the true scale of the consequences of the Chernobyl catastrophe."

The New York Academy of Sciences published a fourth review, by M. I. Balonov of Institute of Radiation Hygiene, St. Petersburg, Russia. The reviewer condemned the book for completely discounting dosimetry and radiation dose reconstruction, relying instead on inferior, simplistic methodologies, such as ecological and geographical techniques and tracking health indicators over time, which are known to give erroneous conclusions. He also noted the inexplicable selection of publications for analysis, which included media reports, websites of public organizations and even unidentified persons. At the same time, a lot of respected, peer-reviewed work from Russian-language authors was ignored. Balonov's review concludes that the value of the report is negative, because it has very little scientific merit while being highly misleading to the lay reader. It also characterized the estimate of nearly a million deaths as more in the realm of science fiction than science.

A fifth review, by Sergei V. Jargin, was published in the journal Radiation and Environmental Biophysics which described Consequences as overestimating the health impacts and containing "poorly substantiated information". One of Jargins comments was

"Prof. Yablokov cites mass media, commercial editions, websites of unclear affiliation and other non-professional publications, to substantiate his opinion. At the same time, international literature on the medical consequences of the Chernobyl accident is scarcely quoted and almost not discussed."

Jargin also states that Yablokov poorly translated the titles of journals and other information sources from Russian into English and used non standard abbreviations for Russian Journals which will hinder any attempts by a person who is attempting to locate and read the sources which Yablokov used.

A reply to the view made by Jargin by Yablokov and A. Nesterenko was also published in the same issue.

== See also ==
- List of books about nuclear issues
- List of Chernobyl-related articles
- The Truth About Chernobyl
