= White Horse (film) =

- Screenshot from the film
- Directed by: Maryann DeLeo; Christophe Bisson
- Written by: Maryann DeLeo; Christophe Bisson
- Starring: Maxym Surkov
- Edited by: Flavia Fontes; Jeremy Stulberg
- Distributed by: Downtown TV Documentaries; HBO
- Release date: 2008
- Running time: 18 minutes
- Country: United States
- Languages: Russian; English

White Horse is a short documentary by filmmakers Maryann DeLeo and Christophe Bisson that features a man (Maxym Surkov) returning to his Ukraine home for the first time in twenty years. Evacuated from the city of Pripyat, Ukraine in 1986 due to the Chernobyl disaster, he has not returned since then. DeLeo is the same filmmaker of the 2004 Academy Award-winning short film Chernobyl Heart.

== Plot ==
The beginning of the film starts with DeLeo, Bisson and Surkov driving through Kyiv. This is introduced as the beginning of their journey to Pripyat, near the ground zero of Chernobyl. Once they reach the outpost outside the exclusion zone, we see that the area surrounding Pripyat is very deserted and dark. Once in the city, we see Surkov's old home, which he explains has been robbed of almost all its belongings due to looters. Yet there are still some mementos in the old apartment, including the wallpaper he and his mother put up, the training bars his father bought for him, an old rubber ball he claims was his favorite and a white horse poster plastered on the wall of his old bedroom. The pain he feels is evident. When he sees an old calendar on a door, he rips a large portion off, claiming "the year ended on April 26th". Outside the door of the apartment, he remarks how he wishes he could stay forever. He throws his old ball through the door and walks out of the apartment complex. The film ends with Surkov snapping some twigs in an old courtyard and then an image of the car they traveled in leaving the exclusion zone.

Film-makers attempted to contact Maxym Surkov, the featured interviewee, when the film debuted. They were informed that he had died from a heart attack in February 2008, shortly after the completion of the film. He is survived by his wife and one daughter.

== Reception ==
In 2008, the film was nominated for a Golden Bear at the Berlin International Film Festival. It also went to the Viennale Film Festival in Vienna, the Lisbon International Film Festival, and showed in Paris at Cinema Du Reel. It was shown on HBO in the USA in April 2009.

== See also ==
- Chernobyl Heart
- List of books about nuclear issues
- List of Chernobyl-related articles
- The Truth About Chernobyl
