= Yury Bandazhevsky =

Belarusian scientist

- Юрый Бандажэўскі; Юрий Бандажевский
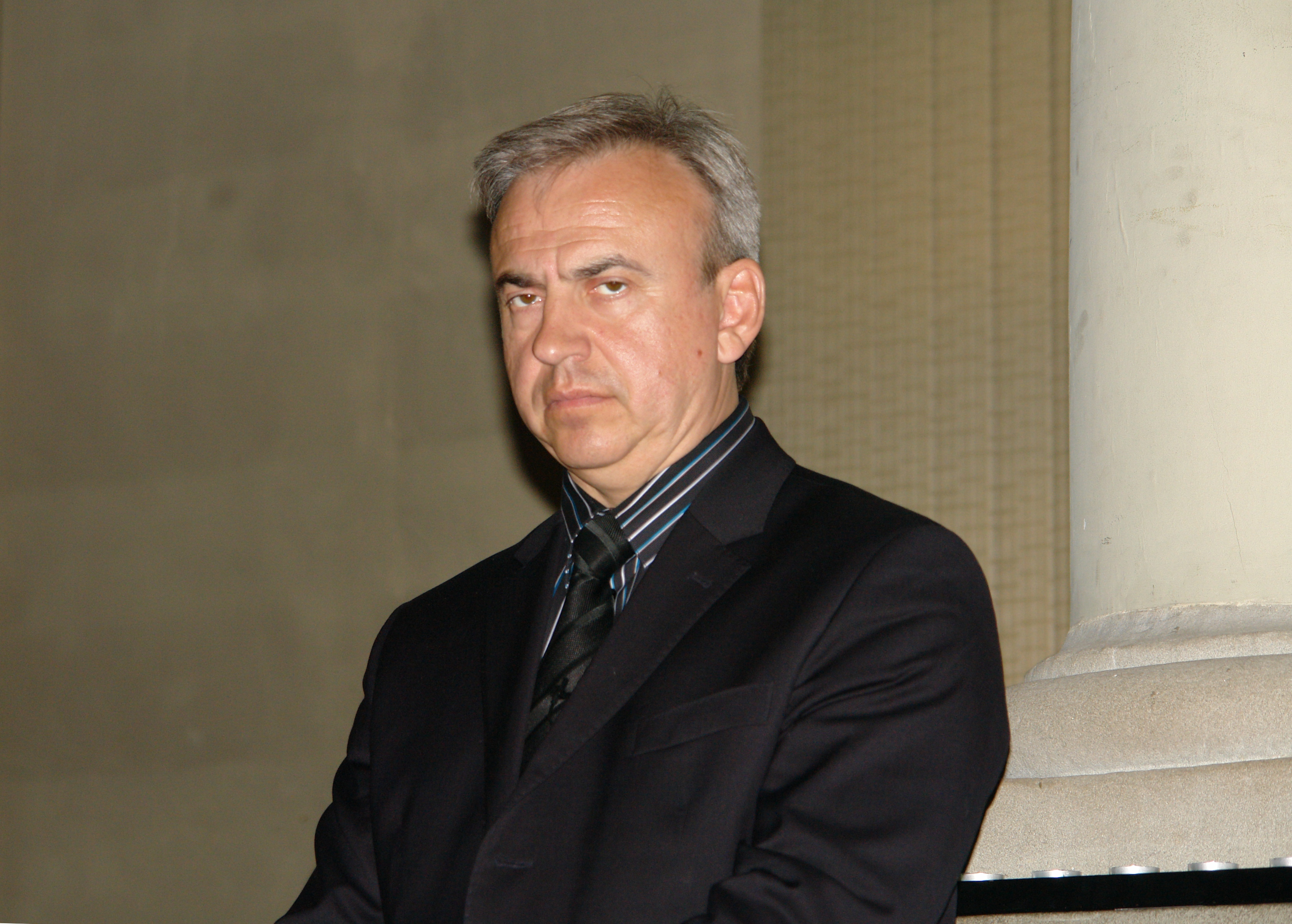
- Born: January 9, 1957 (age 69); Belarus
- Known for: Work on radiation effects after the Chernobyl disaster and subsequently Amnesty International prisoner of conscience.

Yury Bandazhevsky (Belarusian: Юрый Бандажэўскі / Juryj Bandažeŭski, Russian: Юрий Иванович Бандажевский / Yuri Ivanovich Bandazhevski; born January 9, 1957, in Belarus), former director of the Medical Institute in Gomel (Belarus), is a scientist working on consequences of the Chernobyl disaster. He was the founding Rector of Gomel State Medical Institute in Belarus in 1991, specially dedicated to scientific work on the 1986 Chernobyl disaster. Since 2013, Professor Bandazhevsky has been leading Chernobyl Ecology and Health in Ukraine, supported by European Commission. In the aftermath of Chernobyl accident and also 2020 April wildfire near Chernobyl, Bandazhevsky has been calling for international help.

== Background ==
In 1978, Bandazhevsky married Galina Bandazhevskaja, a medical doctor specialized in pediatrics. He studied at the Medical Institute of Grodno and became a specialist of anatomic pathology. He supported his doctoral thesis in 1987, and at the age of 31, he became the youngest professor in the USSR, a year after the Chernobyl disaster. He then named as the director of the Central Laboratory of Scientific Research. In 1990, he became the founding Rector (President) of the Gomel State Medical Institute. After 9 years of research including human body autopsy and animal experiments with cesium included feed, Professor Bandazhevsky made an official conclusion about the actual radiation effects on human body, especially concentrating on cesium accumulated in heart, kidney, liver, thyroid as well as genetic effects on fetus. In 1999, he was arrested on suspicion of terrorism, later convicted for allegedly receiving a bribe, and was released in 2005 and went to France. He became the 25th person to receive a Freedom Passport, approved by the European Parliament, and an honorary citizen of 17 French cities, including Paris. Since 2013, he has been leading an international research center "Ecology and Health (https://chernobyl-health.org/)", established in Kyiv, conducting research on radiation effects on people especially on children in contaminated areas of Ukraine.

== Imprisonment and research afterwards ==
In June 2001, Yury Bandazhevsky was sentenced to eight years imprisonment on the grounds that he had received bribes from students' parents. The institute's Deputy Director, Vladimir Ravkov, also received an eight-year prison sentence. Bandazhevsky's lawyer claimed that he had been convicted on the basis of two testimonies made under duress, without any material evidence. According to many human rights groups Dr. Bandazhevsky was a prisoner of conscience. Amnesty International has stated on their website, "His conviction was widely believed to be related to his scientific research into the Chernobyl catastrophe and his open criticism of the official response to the Chernobyl nuclear reactor disaster on people living in the region of Gomel." His arrest came soon after he published reports critical of the official research being conducted into the Chernobyl incident, and was issued by presidential decree N21 On Urgent Measures for the Combat of Terrorism.

Yury Bandazhevsky was released on parole from prison on August 5, 2005, and prohibited for five months from leaving Belarus. He was afterward invited by the mayor of Clermont-Ferrand, in France, to work at the university and at the hospital on Chernobyl's consequences. Clermont-Ferrand has been since 1977 linked to Gomel where Bandazhevsky used to work. In France, he is notably supported by the Commission de recherche et d'information indépendantes sur la radioactivité (CRIIRAD).

Since 2013, Bandazhevsky has been leading the research and health protection project, "Chernobyl: Ecology and Health" near Chernobyl in Ivankiv District in Ukraine, supported by European Commission.

== Scientific works ==
Caesium-137 levels in children's organs were examined at autopsy. The highest accumulation of Cs-137 was found in the endocrine glands, in particular the thyroid, pancreas and adrenal glands. According to his paper, "Radiocesium and the Heart", high concentration of more than hundreds of Bq/kg were also found in other vital organs, including the heart, intestines, pancreas, kidney, brain, liver, etc. Professor Bandazhevsky's papers since 2013 have been compiled at Chernobyl Ecology and Health.

== See also ==
- Liquidator (Chernobyl)
- Film: Nuclear Controversies (English & Chinese)
- Chernobyl Children's Project International
- List of Chernobyl-related articles
- Christopher Busby
- Vassili Nesterenko
