= Alexei Vladimirovich Yablokov =

Russian biologist and environmentalist (1933–2017)

Alexei Yablokov
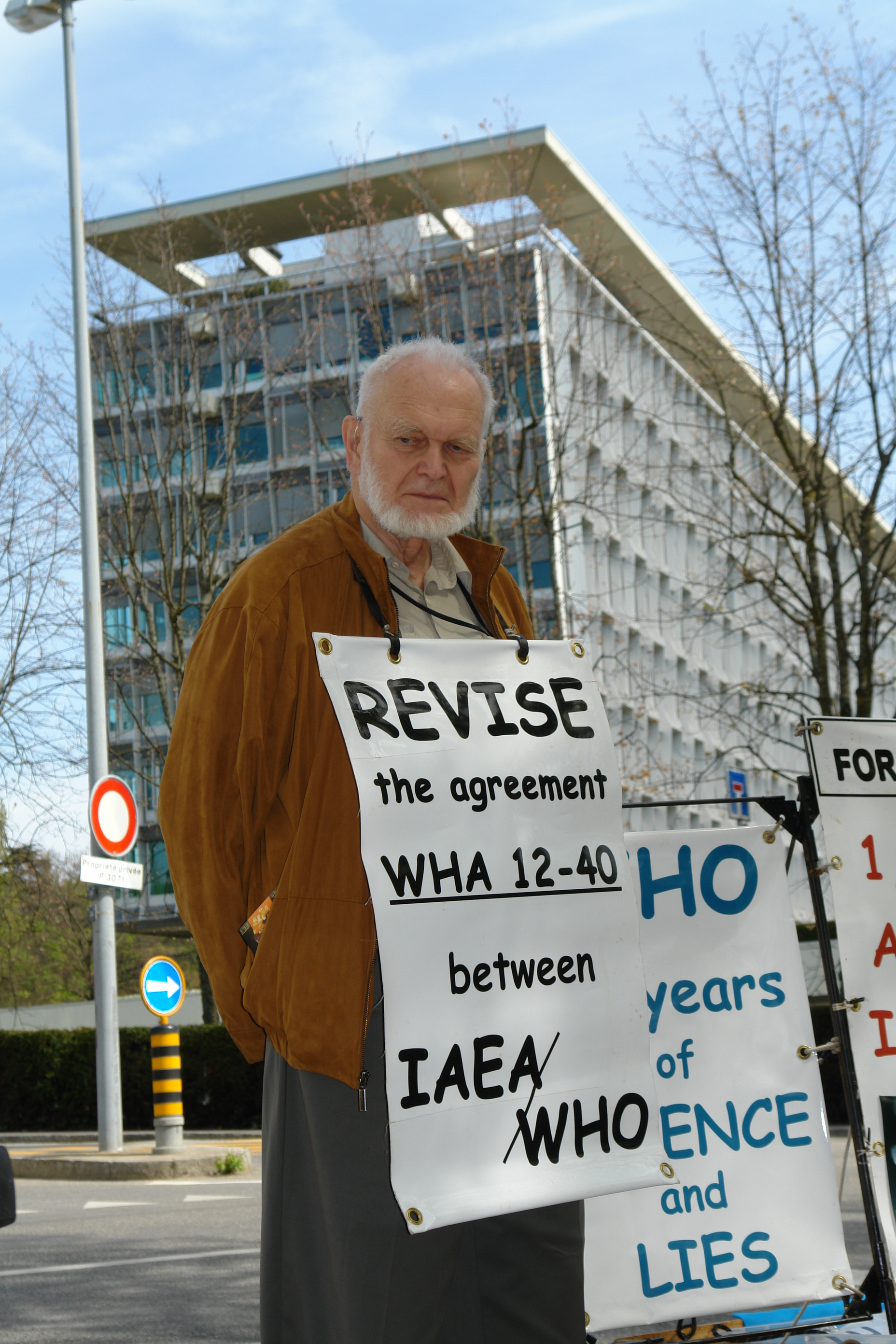
- Born: 3 October 1933; Moscow, Soviet Union
- Died: 10 January 2017 (aged 83); Moscow, Russia
- Education: Moscow State University
- Known for: Co-founding Greenpeace USSR, Chernobyl: Consequences of the Catastrophe for People and the Environment
- Scientific career
- Fields: Zoology, ecology

Alexei Vladimirovich Yablokov (Russian: Алексей Владимирович Яблоков; 3 October 1933 – 10 January 2017) was a Soviet and Russian biologist, environmentalist and politician. He helped found Greenpeace of the USSR and advised President Boris Yeltsin on the environment in the early 1990s. From 2005 he led the Green Russia faction of the opposition party Yabloko. He was the lead author of Chernobyl: Consequences of the Catastrophe for People and the Environment.

== Scientific career ==
Yablokov was born in Moscow on 3 October 1933 and graduated from the biology faculty of Moscow State University in 1956. His research concerned whales, dolphins and pinnipeds and the ways they adapt to life in the water. Out of his analyses of variation in animal populations grew two research directions of his own making, population morphology and the phenetics of natural populations. A textbook of evolutionary theory he wrote in 1969 with Nikolay Timofeev-Ressovsky and Nikolay Vorontsov ran through several editions.

From 1969 Yablokov headed a laboratory at the Koltsov Institute of Developmental Biology in Moscow. He took his doctorate in 1966, became a professor in 1976, and in 1984 the Soviet Academy of Sciences elected him a corresponding member. His output ran to some 500 publications, 26 of them books.

== Government service ==
In 1988 Yablokov helped found Greenpeace of the USSR and led it until 1991. A seat in the Soviet Congress of People's Deputies followed in 1989, along with the deputy chairmanship of the Supreme Soviet's ecology committee. Yeltsin made him state counsellor for ecology and health in August 1991 and his environmental adviser a year later.

In that post Yablokov oversaw a government report that disclosed decades of Soviet dumping of radioactive waste at sea. The disclosure brought Russia more than $3 billion in international assistance for cleanup work. From 1993 to 1997 he chaired the ecological security commission of the Security Council of Russia.

== Later politics ==
Yablokov founded the Green Russia party in 2005 and, once it merged into Yabloko, led its faction there until his death. In 2011 he ran third on Yabloko's list for parliament. Three years later he signed an appeal against Russia's annexation of Crimea. Alexei Yablokov died in Moscow on 10 January 2017.

== Honours ==
Yablokov became a foreign honorary member of the American Academy of Arts and Sciences in 1996 and held a Pew fellowship in marine conservation from 1994. He also won the Karpinsky Prize, the Nuclear-Free Future Award and a gold medal of the Royal Geographical Society.

== Selected works ==
- Timofeev-Ressovsky, N. V.; Vorontsov, N. N.; Yablokov, A. V. (1969). Краткий очерк теории эволюции [A Short Outline of the Theory of Evolution] (in Russian). Moscow: Nauka.
- Yablokov, A. V. (1974). Variability of Mammals. Translated from the Russian. New Delhi: Amerind Publishing.
- Yablokov, A. V. (1986). Phenetics: Evolution, Population, Trait. New York: Columbia University Press. ISBN 978-0-231-05990-9.
- Yablokov, Alexey V.; Nesterenko, Vassily B.; Nesterenko, Alexey V. (2009). Chernobyl: Consequences of the Catastrophe for People and the Environment. Annals of the New York Academy of Sciences, vol. 1181. Blackwell Publishing. ISBN 978-1-57331-757-3.
