= Ian Fairlie =

Canadian radiobiologist

- Education: University of Western Ontario; Barts Medical College; Imperial College London; Princeton University
- Scientific career
- Fields: Consultancy, radiation biology and radiation contamination

Ian Fairlie is a U.K. based Canadian consultant on radiation in the environment and former member of the three person secretariat to Britain's Committee Examining the Radiation Risks of Internal Emitters (CERRIE). He is a radiation biologist who has focused on the radiological hazards of nuclear fuel and he has studied radioactive releases at nuclear facilities since before the Chernobyl accident in 1986.

Fairlie has published papers relating to nuclear issues, dating back to at least 1992, in Annual Review of Public Health, International Journal of Cancer, and Radiation Protection Dosimetry. Fairlie and David Sumner were commissioned by the European Greens to write the 2006 TORCH report, a health impacts report, for the twentieth anniversary of the Chernobyl disaster. In 2016, an updated TORCH report was written. Both Fairlie and Sumner are members of the International Physicians for the Prevention of Nuclear War.

== Academic and consulting work ==
Fairlie studied chemistry at the University of Western Ontario in Canada and radiobiology at Barts Medical College in London. His doctorate examined the impacts of radioactive contamination around Sellafield and La Hague nuclear facilities. He completed doctoral studies at the Imperial College in London and Princeton University (USA), about the health impact of nuclear waste disposal on human health.

Fairlie is a radiation biologist and independent consultant who has focused on the radiological hazards of nuclear fuel. He has acted as a consultant to the British government and was the scientific secretary of the British Government's Commission for investigation of radiation risks of internal emitters (CERRIE). He has researched radioactive releases at nuclear facilities since before the Chernobyl accident in 1986. Fairlie lives in London.

== Selected publications ==
Fairlie has published some papers relating to nuclear issues, dating back to at least 1992. He conducted a detailed epidemiological research study of childhood leukemia cases near nuclear facilities and the hazards of working with tritium.

As a response to the 2006 Chernobyl Forum report he and co-author David Sumner were commissioned by the European Parliament to write the TORCH report: The Other Report on Chernobyl, a health impacts report, for the twentieth anniversary of the Chernobyl disaster. In 2016, an updated TORCH report was written. Both Fairlie and Sumner are members of the International Physicians for the Prevention of Nuclear War, an organization awarded the Nobel Peace Prize in 1985. Fairlie's publications include:

- Energy and Human Health, Annual Review of Public Health March 2013, Vol. 34: 159-188 (with Kirk R. Smith, Howard Frumkin et al.)
- Hypothesis to Explain Childhood Cancer near Nuclear Power Plants, International Journal of Occupational Health 2010;16:341–350.
- French study confirms increased leukemia risks in young children near nuclear power plants, International Journal of Cancer, 11 April 2012, (with Alfred Koerblein).
- When the party's over ... the financial spectre at the end of nuclear power, The Ecologist, 1 October 2015.
- Comment on "Updated investigations of cancer excesses in individuals born or resident in the vicinity of Sellafield and Dounreay: premature all-clear for nuclear power", British Journal of Cancer (2015) 112, 1836–1837 (with A Körblein).
- Uncertainties in Doses and Risks from Internal Radiation, Medicine, Conflict and Survival, Volume 21, Issue 2, 2005.
- The risks of nuclear energy are not exaggerated. Most scientists in this field agree that there is danger even in small doses of radiation, The Guardian, 20 January 2010.
- Hypothesis to Explain Childhood Cancer near Nuclear Power Plants. Int J Occup Environ Health 16:341–350 (2010)
- Childhood Cancer Near German Nuclear Power Stations. Journal of Environmental Science and Health, Part C. 28:1–21 (2010)
- Chernobyl: Consequences Of The Catastrophe For People And The Environment. Radiation Protection Dosimetry. Book Review. 141(1): 97-101. (2010)
- Commentary on J. F. Bithell, et al. Childhood Leukaemia near British Nuclear Installations: Methodological Issues and Recent Results. Radiat Prot Dosimetry. 2010 Jan 138(1):87-8; author reply 89-91. Epub 2009 Oct 19. (with Alfred Körblein)

He has published 17 papers (as of June 2020) which are listed in the Web of Knowledge database, his h-index is six.

== See also ==
- Irradiation
- Radiation-induced cancer
- European Committee on Radiation Risk
