= Flavia Fontes =

American film editor (1961–2021)

Flavia Fontes (February 8, 1961 – April 18, 2021) was a filmmaker and film editor based in New York.

Fontes was born and raised in Brazil, and moved to New York City to attend Hunter College and New York University. She has been making films for more than twenty years. Her work has been broadcast on HBO, PBS, BBC, Discovery Channel, Sundance Channel, Berlin Film Festival, MoMA and Sundance Film Festival.

She directed and edited Forbidden Wedding, which premiered at the Margaret Mead Film Festival at the Museum of Natural History in New York; it has screened in more than twenty-two film festivals and broadcast on Sundance Channel. She also directed and edited Living With Chimpanzees: Portrait of a Family which broadcast in more than 23 countries; it screened at the Museum of Modern Art in New York and other venues around the world. She taught film post-production and editing at The New School University for twelve years. Fontes edited various films including White Horse which premiered at the Berlin Film Festival and broadcast on HBO and screened at Cinema Du Reel in Paris and Terror at Home: Domestic Violence in America broadcast at Lifetime Television, both films were directed by Academy Award-winning director Maryann DeLeo.

== Filmography ==
- Our President: Rafael Correa (Documentary) (filming) 2020
- Who's Afraid of Lynne Stewart? (Documentary) (post-production) 2020
- Ana, Where Are You? (Short) 2014
- Casamento Proibido (TV Movie documentary) 2001
- My Father the Clown (Short) 1999
- Living with Chimpanzees: Portrait of a Family (TV Movie documentary) 1996
