= Voices from Chernobyl =

Book by Svetlana Alexievich

Voices from Chernobyl; Chernobyl Prayer
- Author: Svetlana Alexievich
- Original title: Чернобыльская молитва
- Language: Russian
- Publisher: Ostozhʹe
- Publication date: 1997
- OCLC: 39281739

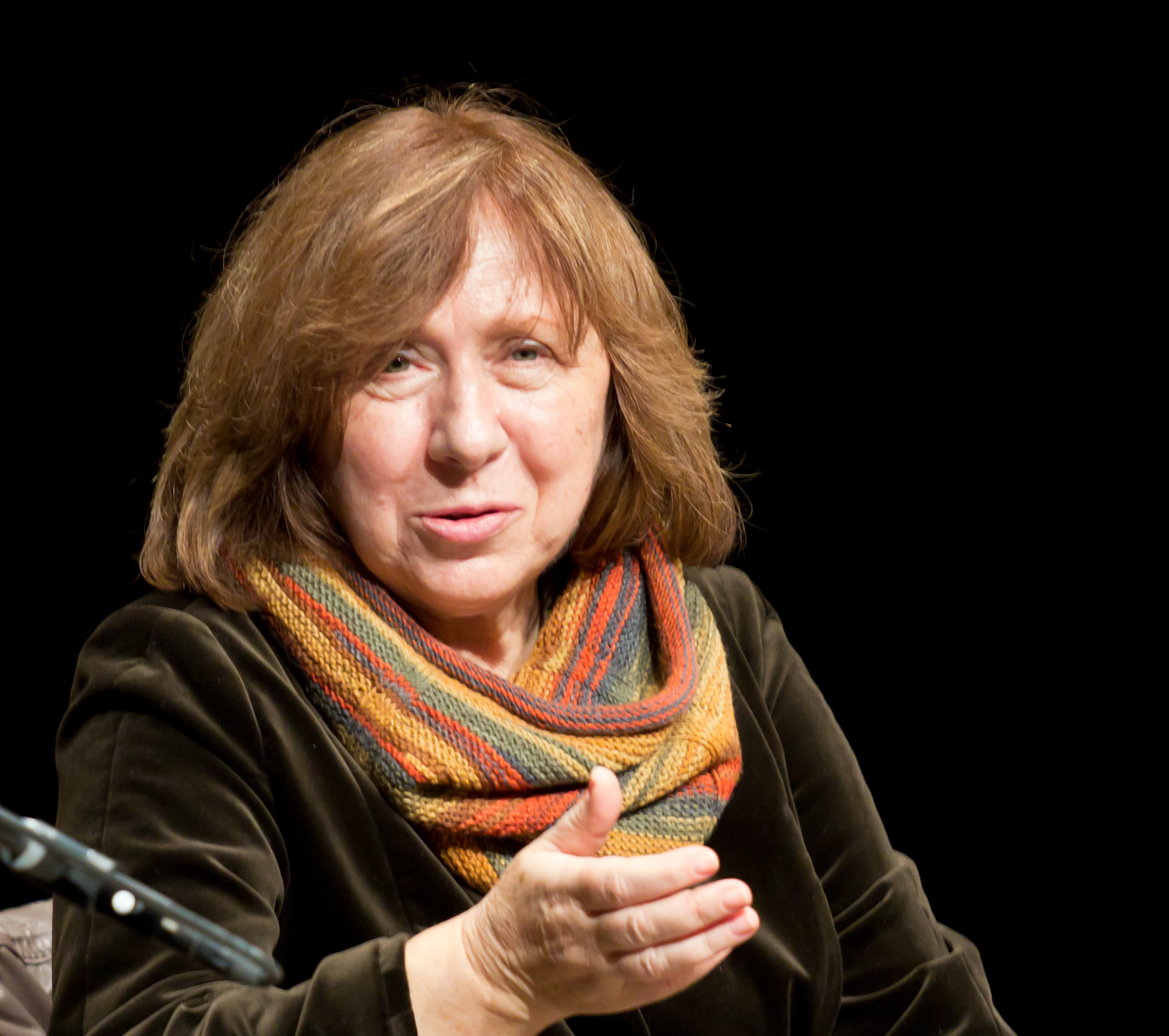
Author Svetlana Alexievich

Voices from Chernobyl: The Oral History of a Nuclear Disaster (Russian: Чернобыльская молитва, romanized: Chernobylskaya molitva, lit. 'Chernobyl Prayer'), published as Chernobyl Prayer: A Chronicle of the Future in the United Kingdom, is a book about the Chernobyl disaster by the Belarusian Nobel Laureate Svetlana Alexievich.

Chernobyl Prayer was first published in Russian in 1997; a revised, updated edition was released in 2013. The American translation was the National Book Critics Circle Award for Nonfiction recipient during 2005.

== Adaptations ==
The HBO television miniseries Chernobyl often relies on the memories of Pripyat locals, as told by Svetlana Alexievich in her book.

A manga adaptation of the book, drawn by Yuuta Kumagai, and supervised by Tetsuji Imanaka and Kazunobu Gotou is published in the bi-weekly Young Animal magazine, having 3 volumes as of February of 2025.

The 1999 English edition of Voices from Chernobyl (Aurum Press), translated by Antonina W. Bouis, was also the principal source for Heavy Water: a poem for Chernobyl, a long poem in multiple voices, which received the Arvon Daily Telegraph International Poetry Prize. This poetry was later the basis of the documentary film Heavy Water: A Film for Chernobyl by Phil Grabsky and David Bickerstaff.

== Editions ==
- Alexievich, Svetlana (2016). Chernobyl Prayer: A Chronicle of the Future. Translated by Gunin, Anna; Tait, Arch. Penguin Modern Classics. ISBN 978-0241270530.
- Alexievich, Svetlana; Gessen, Keith (2005). Voices from Chernobyl: The Oral History of the Nuclear Disaster. Dalkey Archive Press. ISBN 1-56478-401-0.
- Alexievich, Svetlana (1999). Voices from Chernobyl. Translated by Antonina W. Bouis. London: Aurum Press. ISBN 9781854106490.

== See also ==
- List of books about nuclear issues
- List of Chernobyl-related articles
- The Truth About Chernobyl
