= Gomel State Medical University =

Public university in Gomel, Belarus

- Гомельский государственный медицинский университет
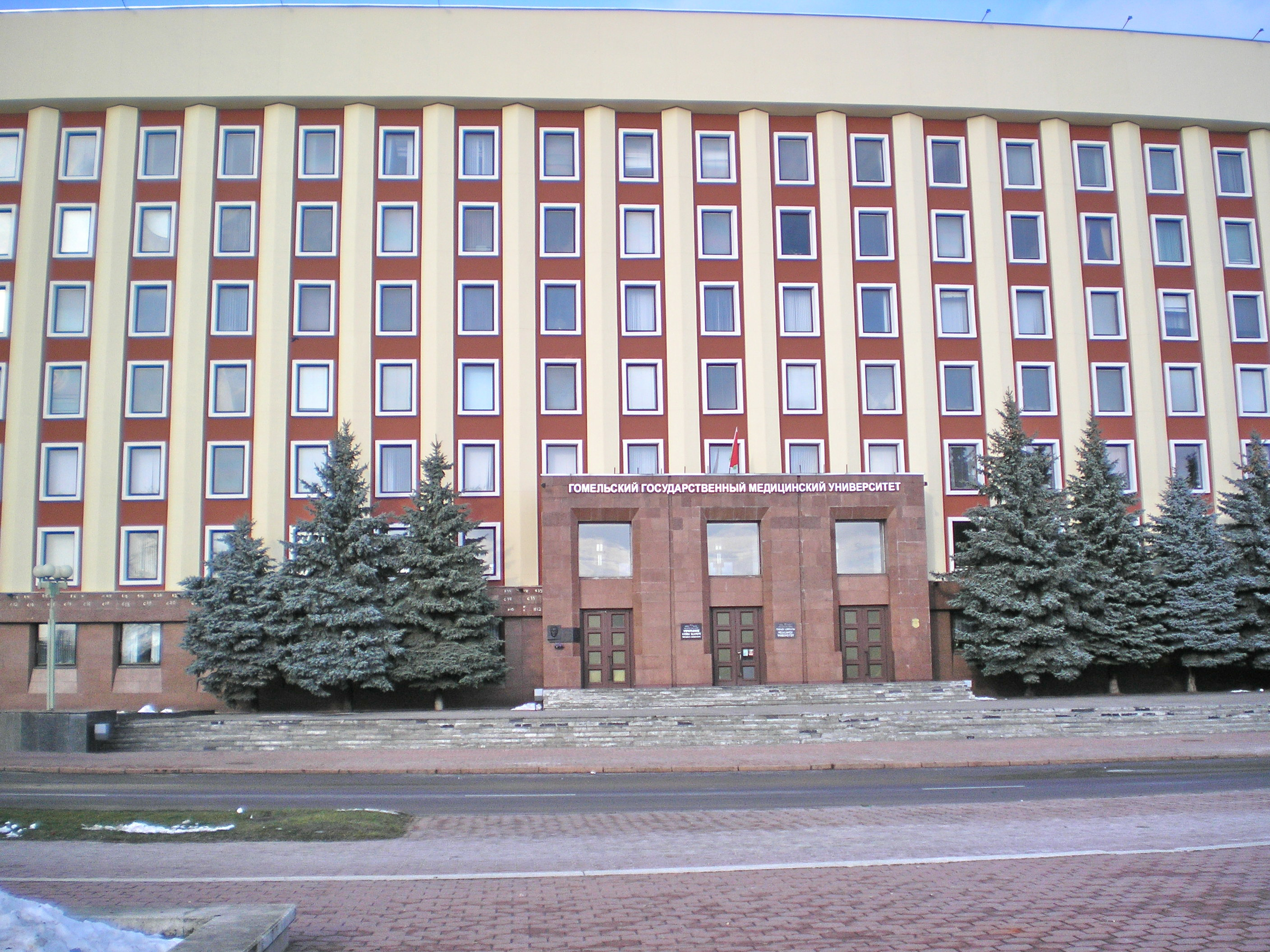
- Gomel State Medical University
- Former names: Gomel State Medical Institute
- Type: public
- Established: 1990
- Rector: IGOR STOMA
- Academic staff: 276
- Students: 3500
- Location: Gomel, Belarus; 52°26′43″N 30°59′32″E
- Campus: Urban
- Website: gsmu.by

Gomel State Medical University (Homiel State Medical University, Гомельский государственный медицинский университет; former name: Gomel State Medical Institute) is public teaching university based in Gomel, Belarus.

== History ==
In 1990 Gomel State Medical University was founded as per resolution of the Council of Ministers and Order of the Minister of Health of the Byelorussian Soviet Socialist Republic.

== Education ==
The main campus of Gomel State Medical University is located in downtown Gomel, with 18 adjacent clinical sites spread across the city. Education at Gomel State Medical University includes five to six-year programs in basic and clinical medical science. Graduates of the University obtain M.D. degree and are required to complete a minimum of a one-year internship in order to practice clinical medicine. Education of foreign students at Gomel State Medical University started in 2003.

== Rectors ==
- Yury Bandazhevsky (1990-1999)
- Sergei Vladimirovich Zavoronok (1999-2007)
- Anatoly Nikolayevich Lyzikov (2007-current)
