= TORCH report =

Health impact report on the Chernobyl disaster

The TORCH report (The Other Report on Chernobyl) was a health impacts report requested by the European Greens in 2006, for the twentieth anniversary of the Chernobyl disaster, in reply to the 2006 report of the Chernobyl Forum which was criticized by some advocacy organizations opposed to nuclear energy such as Greenpeace.

In 2006, German Green Member of the European Parliament Rebecca Harms, commissioned two British scientists to write an alternate report (TORCH, The Other Report on Chernobyl) as a response to the 2006 Chernobyl Forum report. The two British scientists that published the report were radiation biologist Ian Fairlie and David Sumner. Both are members of the International Physicians for the Prevention of Nuclear War, an organization awarded the Nobel Peace Prize in 1985.

In 2016, an updated TORCH report was written by Ian Fairlie with support of Friends of the Earth Austria.

== Themes ==
The summary of the 2006 TORCH report said, in part:

"Early on April 26 1986, two explosions in Chernobyl unit 4 completely destroyed the reactor. The explosions sent large clouds of radioactive gases and debris 7 - 9 kilometres into the atmosphere. About 30% of the reactor’s 190 tons of fuel was distributed over the reactor building and surrounding areas and about 1-2% was ejected into the atmosphere. The reactor’s inventory of radioactive gases was released at this time. The subsequent fire, fuelled by 1,700 tons of graphite moderator, lasted for eight days. This fire was the principal reason for the extreme severity of the Chernobyl disaster."

"The long-term consequences of the accident remain uncertain. Exposure to ionising radiation can induce cancer in almost every organ in the body. However, the time interval between the exposure to radiation and the appearance of cancer can be 50 to 60 years or more. The total number of cancer deaths from Chernobyl most likely will never be fully known. However the TORCH Report makes predictions of the numbers of excess cancer deaths from published collective doses to affected populations."

== Contamination range ==
The 2006 TORCH Report stated that:

"In terms of their surface areas, Belarus (22% of its land area) and Austria (13%) were most affected by higher levels of contamination. Other countries were seriously affected; for example, more than 5% of Ukraine, Finland and Sweden were contaminated to high levels (> 40,000 Bq/m² caesium-137). More than 80% of Moldova, the European part of Turkey, Slovenia, Switzerland, Austria and the Slovak Republic were contaminated to lower levels (> 4000 Bq/m² caesium-137). And 44% of Germany and 34% of the UK were similarly affected."

The 2016 report said that 5 million people still live in areas highly contaminated by radiation, in Belarus, Russia, and Ukraine. 400 million people still live in areas which are less contaminated.

== Iodine and thyroid effects ==
The TORCH 2006 report "estimated that more than half the iodine-131 from Chernobyl [which increases the risk of thyroid cancer] was deposited outside the former Soviet Union. Possible increases in thyroid cancer have been reported in the Czech Republic and the UK, but more research is needed to evaluate thyroid cancer incidence in Western Europe". It predicted about 30,000 to 60,000 excess cancer deaths and warned that predictions of excess cancer deaths strongly depend on the risk factor used; and predicted excess cases of thyroid cancer range between 18,000 and 66,000 in Belarus alone depending on the risk projection model.

By 2016, 6,000 cases of thyroid cancer had been diagnosed, with another 16,000 expected. More generally, 40,000 fatal cancer cases are expected across Europe.

== Health effects other than cancer ==
The TORCH report also stated that "two non-cancer effects, cataract induction and cardiovascular diseases, are well documented with clear evidence of a Chernobyl connection." Quoting the report, Nature wrote that: "it is well known that radiation can damage genes and chromosomes"; "the relationship between genetic changes and the development of future disease is complex and the relevance of such damage to future risk is often unclear. On the other hand, a number of recent studies have examined genetic damage in those exposed to radiation from the Chernobyl accident. Studies in Belarus have suggested a twofold increase in the germline minisatellite mutation rate".

== Evacuations ==
Some 116,000 people were evacuated from contaminated areas initially, and later 230,000 people were relocated and resettled.

== See also ==
- Chernobyl disaster
- Effects of the Chernobyl disaster
- List of Chernobyl-related articles
- Nuclear power debate
