= Christophe Bisson =

French film director

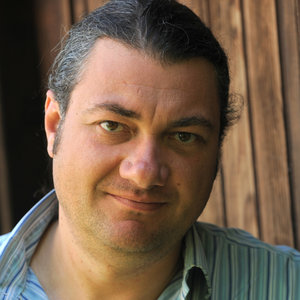
- Occupation: Film director

Christophe Bisson is an international film director. He created, with the American filmmaker Maryann De leo, the documentary White Horse for HBO Studios and the Discovery Channel. He is a well-known artist based in Caen, France.

White Horse features a man (Maxym Surkov) returning to his home in Ukraine for the first time in 20 years. He was evacuated from the city of Pripyat, Ukraine (then part of the Soviet Union) in 1986 due to the Chernobyl disaster. The main character was contacted by the filmmakers when the film debuted. His wife informed them in February 2008 that he had died from a heart attack shortly after the completion of the film. His wife and one daughter survived him. In 2011, Bisson made a short documentary film Road movie, in a French psychiatric institution. It was selected in the French competition at the 2011 FID Marseille festival. In 2012, Bisson made another short documentary film, Liquidation, in the same institution. It was selected at the 2013 Cinéma du réel festival in Paris. The same year, he made Au monde (into the world) produced by Triptyque films. Claire Atherton was the editor. The film was selected at the in the French competition. Jean-Pierre Rehm, Director of FID Marseille, wrote: "This film is also about speech, its privation and its rough rediscovery. Following an amputation of the larynx, a man named Joël Perrotte decided to reinforce his muteness by hiding in the basement of his house. It is the story of this retreat from the world, and his subsequent resurfacing, that he recounts in detail, facing the screen, with a strange, mechanical voice which he had firstly to master and then recognise as his own".
