= Mykola Tytenok =

Soviet firefighter

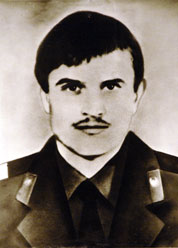
- Mykola Tytenok
- Native name: Микола Іванович Титенок
- Born: Nikolai Ivanovich Titenok; 5 December 1962; Vilcha, Ukrainian SSR, Soviet Union
- Died: 16 May 1986 (aged 23) Moscow, Soviet Union
- Buried: Mitinskoe Cemetery
- Allegiance: Soviet Union
- Branch: Internal Troops of the Ministry of Internal Affairs of the USSR; Paramilitary Fire Service of the Ministry of Internal Affairs of the USSR
- Service years: 1984–1986
- Rank: Senior Sergeant
- Conflicts: Chernobyl disaster
- Awards: Hero of Ukraine (2006); Order of the Red Banner (1986); Ukraine's Order for Courage (1996)
- Spouse: Tatyana Titenok
- Children: Sergey Titenok

Nikolai Ivanovich Titenok (Ukrainian: Микола Іванович Титенок; Russian: Николай Иванович Титенок; 5 December 1962 – 16 May 1986) was a Soviet firefighter and first responder to the Chernobyl disaster. He received a lethal dose of radiation whilst firefighting and was hospitalized in Moscow Hospital No.6, and died 20 days later from radiation sickness.

== Life ==
Titenok was born in the village of Vilcha in northern Ukraine. After graduating high school in 1980, he immediately entered the Kronstadt Naval School No. 42 and reached the rank of starshina 1st class (equivalent to a sergeant) and graduated in June 1981. He served in the Soviet Navy until October 1984, and joined the Soviet Ministry of Internal Affairs as a firefighter on December 20, 1984.

He was married to Tatyana Titenok in early 1985, and their son Sergey was born in September 1985.

== Chernobyl disaster ==
Titenok was attached to SWPCH-6 (6th Paramilitary Fire Department) for the protection of Pripyat. He was on duty at the time of the disaster, and when the emergency alert from the nuclear power plant's fire station came through at 1:25 AM, he climbed aboard an ATS-40 (130) 63A firefighting vehicle based on the ZIL-130 chassis, along with his superior Lieutenant Viktor Kibenok, and his colleague Nikolai Vashchuk, all of whom would later die.

SWPCH-6 arrived on the scene of the disaster at 1:35 AM along the southern side, parking along the turbine hall next to the trucks from HPV-2 (NPP's fire department). Soon after disembarking, Lieutenant Kibenok received orders from Lieutenant Pravik over radio (who at that point was the site commander) telling Kibenok to move his vehicles to the north side of the reactor building, as the fire on the roof of the ventilation block needed to be extinguished to prevent the fire from spreading to the adjacent reactor 3, which at this point, was still operating. At 1:38, Titenok was on the north side of the plant, close to the VSRO building, helping his colleagues connect hose lines to hydrants, preparing to make the climb to the roof of the third reactor. None of the men from SWPCH-6, including Titenok, had any idea that this would be fatal.

At 1:47 AM, PPC-17 arrived (the Chernobyl Town fire department). Titenok immediately ran to the arriving trucks, and began helping them roll out and connect hose lines, so they could establish a water supply.

Lieutenant Kibenok convened with Lieutenant Pravik, asking him how to reach the roof of the third reactor, as they were city firefighters and didn't know the route. Pravik told Kibenok to deploy his mechanical ladder-truck, giving them access to the roof of the VSRO building, from there allowing them to reach the fire escape on the northern face of unit 3, which led directly to the roof. Since Kibenok didn't know the way, Pravik offered to guide his squad instead.

At around 1:53 AM, Titenok, along with: Vasily Ignatenko, Nikolai Vashchuk, Vladimir Pravik and Vladimir Tishura, all began climbing to the roof of the third unit. Firstly by using the ladder truck, then using the fire escape staircase to reach the roof of unit 3. When they reached the roof, both Titenok and Tishura were having issues with the pressure of their hoses - it was too low. At around 2:00 AM, Pravik shouted down the radio to the Ural fire truck driver: "Give us some more pressure!" A few minutes later, they climbed to the roof of the vent block roof, later named 'Masha'. At 2:05 AM Lieutenant Pravik reported "Explosion in the reactor compartment." over the radio. Hearing this, Lieutenant Kibenok began climbing to the roof as well.

Titenok, along with Tishura, began attempting to quench the small flames, started by pieces of super-heated graphite and fuel assemblies igniting the bitumen covered roof. The burning bitumen quickly became a hindrance to the men on the roof, as it melted due to the heat, and began sticking to their boots, making it hard to move. The burning bitumen also produced thick black smoke, which they were all breathing in, and which caused burns their airways. The super-heated fuel proved difficult to extinguish, as the water was often evaporated before it could even reach the flames. Thus, the firemen began trying to stomp out glowing pieces of fuel and burning graphite chunks.

After around twenty minutes, Vladimir Tishura collapsed, he was unable to stand and was violently vomiting, a few minutes later, Titenok himself collapsed. Vasily Ignatenko helped carry them both down from the roof. They were helped out of their firefighting gear by their comrades, and ordered by Leonid Telyatnikov to go to ABK-2 (2nd administration building between units 2 & 3) and await the arrival of ambulances.

By 2:35 AM, ambulances had arrived, and Titenok and his squad were taken to Sanitary Unit No.126 in Pripyat.

== Hospitalization and death ==
On the night of the accident, Titenok was admitted to Sanitary Unit No.126 in Pripyat and stayed there for a day, before being transported by plane from Boryspil Airport to Moscow. They then were admitted to Hospital No.6 in Moscow, which specialised in treating radiological accidents.

On May 4, Titenok wrote to his wife and son from hospital, the letter read as follows:

"Hello, my beloved wife and my son Serezhenka! Today is Sunday, May 4th. It's been a week since I got here. The main thing... How is my health? Fine. Only it is very, very painful to swallow and eat, there are many blisters in my mouth. But soon everything will pass, in two weeks. They'll put a catheter in the chest, that is, a tube that food comes through. The veins in my arms were swollen from the IV's. They are replaced every day. I'm lying down and writing slowly. Walking around is not allowed.

And now about the most important thing. How are my son and you feeling? Are you healthy? Describe everything, all of the features. I dream about you, you are in front of my eyes and I think about you all the time. Tanya, come back in two weeks, May 19th-20th, I'll be waiting. I'm lying down, they won't let me out of the ward to go anywhere. And on May 20th, I will feel better, I will be able to stay with you longer and take a walk. Do not worry. I'm already tired, and a little headache. I kiss you and Serezha tightly. I hug everyone tightly.

Nikolai, your husband.

May 4, 1986"

On May 7, his condition began to worsen. His wife visited the ward everyday until his death. When Tatyana entered his room on May 8, Nikolai requested for her to bring him some sea buckthorn oil from Pripyat - he was unaware it had been evacuated. He then reportedly asked his wife to take him home to Ukraine, and for her to come take him out of the ward on May 16. And on May 16, he died.

Nikolai Titenok's official cause of death was a blistered heart due to severe ARS, and he was buried in Mitinskoe Cemetery, Moscow, along with the other deceased firefighters and plant workers.

== Awards ==
- Order of the Red Banner (1986)
- Ukraine's Order for Courage (1996)
- Hero of Ukraine (2006)

== Legacy ==
Titenok's wife and son are both still alive as of 2019. His son Sergey became a firefighter in Kyiv. Multiple monuments and statues have been erected in his honour all across Ukraine, including a bust in the "Heroes of Chernobyl Alley".
