= Children of Chernobyl Benefit Concert =

1991 charity concert in Minsk

The Children of Chernobyl Benefit Concert was held at the Dynama Stadium in Minsk, BSSR, on April 23 and 24, 1991, five years after the nuclear reactor’s meltdown. The event featured bands from around the world and was staged to raise funds for the Children of Chernobyl, the victims of the aftermath of the nuclear fallout. It also served to raise awareness of the tragic legacy of the Chernobyl disaster during a period that coincided with a visit of the United Nations Coordinator for Chernobyl to the area, specifically when the IAEA assessed the necessity of the Belarusian government’s proposed relocation criteria as overstated.

As part of this international multimedia project, a British documentary team and a press photographer were dispatched from London for the Minsk charity concert, where this political discord was at the heart of the documentary’s discourse, investigating the cause and effect behind rising leukaemia cases in children. The filmmakers explored these core issues by juxtaposing the energetic stadium performances in aid of suffering children against fact-finding footage from a local leukaemia ward, scientists’ comments, and archival material depicting contaminated exclusion zones, aiming to highlight official cover-ups and the human scale of the ongoing crisis. The resulting film, produced by Ian Stewart and titled Chernobyl—Playing for Time, was narrated by Academy Award-winning actress Glenda Jackson.

== History ==
The Liverpool-based DJ and music promoter Dimitri Korziouk became concerned about the aftermath of the Chernobyl disaster after visiting children in the hospital in Belarus who were suffering from its effects and, since then, had dreamed up the idea of staging a benefit concert in aid of the Children of Chernobyl.

Having moved from London, where he worked as a DJ and musician, to Liverpool a couple of years earlier, he very soon became closely involved with local musicians, music events, studios and club culture.

The established contacts in Liverpool proved invaluable when he made the decision to stage his charity “Live Aid”-style event in the three proposed cities: Minsk, Moscow and Kiev in April 1991, in aid of children affected by the Chernobyl radioactive fallout in these areas of the USSR.

To help finance this “Live Aid”-style project and get it off the ground, Dimitri Korziouk, the event organiser, sold his Liverpool home.

Liverpool’s bands were beginning to line up for a Soviet version of Live Aid. The first to respond were OMD, The Christians, The Farm, and many up-and-coming bands from the city such as Real East, Charlie Don’t Surf, Loop Garu, 25th of May, and 16 Tambourines.

The growing line-up was subsequently joined by Lindisfarne, a folk-rock band from Newcastle upon Tyne, and the up-and-coming Bootle band Si-An. Lindisfarne was managed by Steve Weltman, an experienced music-industry professional previously affiliated with Charisma Records. Si-An was jointly managed by Bob Young, also an experienced music-industry professional who had spent 13 years working as Status Quo’s tour manager and songwriter, and David Moores, an entrepreneur who later that year became chairman of Liverpool F.C. and regarded himself as a custodian of the club. These industry professionals formed a core cohort of tour managers for this international Children of Chernobyl Benefit Concert project. Young accompanied Si-An to Minsk, where the group performed before the largest audience of its career. Weltman—who also managed the up-and-coming Liverpool band Big Still and the American singer Ellie Sarty—proposed those two acts to the event organiser, Dimitri Korziouk, and after they were accepted, he accompanied all three acts—Lindisfarne, Big Still and Sarty—to Minsk as their tour manager.

The Minsk line-up was later strengthened by Echo & the Bunnymen and China Crisis, two established Liverpool bands that were expected to headline the British contingent together with Lindisfarne. Both Liverpool bands travelled to the Soviet Union and performed at the Dynamo Stadium, where they were reported to have received an enthusiastic response.

Back in the USSR, the biggest obstacles to staging a Live Aid-style concert there were the cover-ups and denial of the effects of radioactive fallout, which were systemic throughout the Soviet apparatus.

However, the scientific community in Minsk, Belarus, openly discussed the scale of the disaster and directly criticised the slow response of some authorities. On 30 September 1989, tens of thousands of citizens took to the streets of Minsk to voice their outrage over bureaucratic inertia and the suppression of facts surrounding the April 1986 nuclear accident.

Less than a year later, despite the obstacles, the government agreed to stage the event on the fifth anniversary of the Chernobyl disaster, on 23–24 April 1991.

As a result, after nearly a year of project development and pre-production, an agreement was signed between MAAP International and the Belarusian Ministry of Culture to stage the event in Minsk.

At the same time, MAAP International and the Daily Express newspaper formed an association and began working jointly in support of the UK’s Children of Chernobyl Appeal.

== Charities and Association with the Daily Express Children of Chernobyl Appeal ==
As the promoter and organiser of the Children of Chernobyl Benefit Concert, Dimitri Korziouk partnered with established charities to administer the funds raised from the forthcoming concert in Minsk. Under the agreement with the Belarusian Ministry of Culture, funds raised by the concert in Minsk were to remain in Belarus and be administered there through the ministry for the benefit of children affected by the Chernobyl disaster. Funds raised outside of the USSR required a Western-based charity to receive and administer the proceeds; Korziouk therefore sought an established charitable appeal in the United Kingdom.

The most suitable charitable partner in the UK was the Daily Express Children of Chernobyl Appeal, which the newspaper had launched in September 1990. By early 1991, the appeal fund had exceeded £300,000, including £70,000 donated by Cliff Richard from the proceeds of his charity concert at Wembley Arena on 7 January 1991. The Daily Express subsequently formalised its association with MAAP International and Korziouk, bringing together the newspaper’s established national appeal and the international music-based fundraising project, and publicly affirmed its support for the planned benefit concerts in Minsk and Kiev.

The objectives of the Daily Express Children of Chernobyl Appeal were set out in a four-page humanitarian appeal and case-for-support document. The document was signed by musicians who offered their support to the project. David A. Stewart, formerly of Eurythmics, signed it with members of his band, the Spiritual Cowboys, including Martin Chambers, Chris Bostock and John “Tex” Turnbull. Other signatories included Andy McCluskey of OMD, Eddie Lundon of China Crisis, Jake Brockman of Echo & the Bunnymen, Jarvis Whitehead of It's Immaterial and Garry Christian of the Christians, together with the Minsk charity concert organiser Dimitri Korziouk of MAAP International.

As the event attracted the attention of other charities worldwide, Sharon Moore, co-founder of the US-based Christian charity CitiHope International, even appeared as a singer on stage at the Children of Chernobyl Benefit Concert in Minsk, alongside the Belarusian children's choir Krynichka. The Krynichka ensemble, consisting of young people affected by the tragedy, performed at a matinee for local families and humanitarian groups before the main rock bands took to the stage. The ensemble later toured the United States for the same cause, raising further funds for young victims and culminating in a 1997 Broadway performance.

== The Concert ==
After months of preparation, the international benefit concert finally took place at the Dynamo Stadium in Minsk in April 1991, around the fifth anniversary of the Chernobyl disaster. Despite the cold weather spell, thousands of people gathered in the stadium for the two-day event. The concert programme offered approximately seven and a half hours of music each day, bringing visiting performers from Britain and the United States together with some of the best-known rock bands and artists from across the Soviet Union.

Among the British bands performing at the open-air event in Minsk were Echo & the Bunnymen, China Crisis, Lindisfarne, SI-AN and Big Still, together with the American singer Ellie Sarty. They were joined by Soviet performers including DDT, Time Machine, Nautilus Pompilius, Inspector and Igor Talkov. A sense of camaraderie developed between the Western and Soviet musicians during the preparations and performances. The British and American contingent introduced a diverse range of musical styles to the stadium audience, performing in a distinctive Western Live Aid style that provided a counterweight to the Soviet rock acts. These visiting groups, including Echo & the Bunnymen, China Crisis and Lindisfarne, used the stage to advocate for environmental protection, international cooperation and humanitarian support for children affected by the Chernobyl disaster.

By contrast, some Soviet performers used the open-air event to express direct political criticism. Time Machine and Nautilus Pompilius called for the removal of President Mikhail Gorbachev and independence for the Baltic nations. Igor Talkov reportedly received the strongest audience response with a song drawing a parallel between the initials KPSS—the Communist Party of the Soviet Union—and the SS of Nazi Germany.

At the same time, not all of the Liverpool bands were able to reach Minsk. Plans to transport more than 20 groups to the Soviet Union by double-decker bus collapsed when travel insurance could not be obtained. But The Real East, which had previously been announced as due to play at the benefit concert, made its own way to Russia in a hired van.

Some local Liverpool bands that could not make the journey to Minsk showed their support for the fundraising event by appearing in Scousephenomena, a documentary filmed by the Belarusian Letopis film studio in Liverpool before the Minsk concert. The documentary opened with an interview with Andy McCluskey of OMD at the Pink Museum studio; McCluskey had also signed the Daily Express Children of Chernobyl Appeal. Intended to get audiences “rocking in the USSR” in support of the charitable event, the film was produced for exhibition to local cinema and television audiences in the Soviet Union.

The Christians, one of Liverpool’s leading bands, contributed an exclusive video filmed in Sefton Park, Liverpool, to another fundraising documentary. Produced by the London-based Rude Productions, the material was incorporated into Chernobyl—Playing for Time, together with footage of the Liverpool groups that performed at the benefit concert in Minsk.

Before taking to the stage, several of the visiting musicians went to local hospitals to meet children receiving treatment for leukaemia and other illnesses associated with the aftermath of Chernobyl. Among them was former Pretenders drummer Martin Chambers, who played guitar for children in one of the hospital wards. The concerts raised 250,000 roubles for the children of Chernobyl and were filmed for a proposed international television programme, from which it was hoped that further funds would be generated through television, video and recording rights.
