= Chornobyl.3828 =

Chernobyl.3828
- Directed by: Serhiy Zabolotnyi
- Written by: Khem Salgannik; Igor Kobrin
- Produced by: Igor Kobrin
- Music by: Igor Solomatin
- Distributed by: Studio "Telecon"
- Release date: 2011
- Running time: 30 minutes
- Country: Ukraine
- Language: Russian

Chernobyl.3828 (Russian: «Чернобыль.3828»), or Chornobyl.3828 is a 2011 Ukrainian documentary film about the Chernobyl disaster. Directed by Serhiy Zabolotnyi, it is dedicated to the "Chernobyl liquidators" who were involved in cleaning the most dangerous areas of the plant roof, the "Masha" ("M") zone. The film is named for the 3,828 people who worked in this area.

== Plot ==
Twenty-five years have passed since Valeriy Starodumov worked as a dosimeter scout in September 1986. Valeriy worked at the epicenter of the explosion, the reactor's operation area, which was the most radioactive part of the site. The protagonist, a direct participant in the operation, went to the roof himself and brought people there after a failed attempt to clear the area with robots. At the government level, it was decided to assign soldiers and cadets of military schools to the task of cleaning the roofs. Unique pictures of the events of 1986 are widely used in the film. Chernobyl.3828 is dedicated to people who saved the world from the radioactive contamination at the cost of their health and life.

The film director Serhiy Zabolotnyi commented, "We all know what happened on April 26, 1986, but we know next to nothing about the events of the summer and autumn of 1986. Chernobyl.3828 is just one of many stories you need to know and remember."

== Awards ==
- 2012 — Grand Prix at the Kyiv International Film Festival of Documentary Films "Kinolitopys"
- 2017 — Special Recognition for CHERNOBYL.3828 at the Uranium Film Festival
