= Chernobyl: Zone of Exclusion =

2014 Russian TV series

- Genre: drama thriller mystery horror
- Created by: Vitaliy Shliappo; Vasily Kutsenko; Igor Tudvasev; Dmitry Yan; Pavel Danilov
- Directed by: Anders Banke
- Starring: Konstantin Davidov; Sergey Romanovich; Valeria Dmitrieva; Kristina Kazinskaya; Anvar Halilulaev
- Country of origin: Russia
- Original language: Russian
- No. of seasons: 2
- No. of episodes: 16

Production
- Producers: Alexander Dulerayn; Valeriy Feodorovich; Evgeniy Nikishov
- Running time: 44–50 minutes per episode
- Production company: CineLab Production

Original release
- Network: TNT and TV-3 (Russia)
- Release: October 13, 2014 – December 1, 2017

Chernobyl: Zone of Exclusion (Russian: Чернобыль: Зона отчуждения, translit. Chernobyl': Zona otchuzhdeniya) is a Russian mystery, thriller, drama TV series that focuses on five friends going to the Chernobyl Exclusion Zone to recover stolen money. There they come across the dangers and mysteries of the Zone. This is the first feature film to be partly filmed in Pripyat.

== Series overview ==
Season 1

The action of the series takes place in two time layers: in 2013 and in 1986, on the eve of the Chernobyl accident. The main characters-five friends: Pasha, Lyosha, Nastya, Anya and Gosha.

The next morning, after a party, a system administrator comes to Pasha's home to repair the network. While friends are sitting in the kitchen, he takes the money from the safe and runs away. Noticing the loss, the heroes set out on the Volga in pursuit of the robber to Pripyat, coming across a time machine capable of bringing them back to 1986, on the day before the disaster, and back to 2013. Any changes made in the "1986 world" then alters documentation such as photographs in 2013 (which essentially evolved from 1986), so that a person evading death in the "1986 world" would have his present-day photograph added with his/her (grand-)children that would not have existed if he/she was killed in the original timeframe. The exclusion zone is represented in the show an independent character, with its own logic and intentions, and the capability of creating "Phantoms", life-sized replicas of humans who entered a building with identical looks and voices, but these are unable to leave the building in which the actual person entered. They are not physical entities and therefore cannot be touched or hurt in any way, and serve as the primary means of communication between the Zone and humans who enter it.

Ultimately, Pasha manages to change the past by collaborating with Sergei Kostenko, captain of KGB, who was blamed for the original disaster and seeking revenge, travelling from 2013, killing Pasha's friends and everyone who stood in his way to get to Pasha and tell him that it was "not a joke", and to avert the disaster by destroying the nuclear power plant's chimney, therefore stopping the test that led to the disaster. Intercepted by his 1986-self, Kostenko returned fire and killed his former self, and seemingly disappeared in the air, while Pasha blew up the chimney, effectively stopping the disaster from happening. He later finds himself in an alternative 2013, where the Soviet Union did not disintegrate, and all the events after the accident at the nuclear power plant occurred in the United States instead of Ukraine, which turned into the Severed States of America, but his friends has been killed by Kostenko.

Season 2

The action of season 2 continues the events of the last series of season 1 and unfolds in two alternative versions of the countries: the USSR and the United States, which became the SSA (Separated States of America), in which August 7, 1986 there was an alternative version of the accident at the nuclear power plant "Calvert Cliffs" instead of Chernobyl and there is a civil war.

Pasha would have to gather his friends, who have changed, go back in time and return to their seats. Also, they are joined by a mysterious Nikita in a mask, under which he hides his mutilated face.

The characters will visit several time layers, starting in 1956 and ending with an alternative year 2013.

=== Feature film ===
Filming began on September 30, 2018. The premiere is scheduled for September 19, 2019. According to the actors, the film will complete the whole story.

== Cast ==
- Konstantin Davydov as Pasha - a 20-year-old boy from Moscow who was robbed and now heads to Pripyat with his friends to return the money.
- Sergey Romanovich as Lyosha - Pasha's best friend who often bullies Gosha and often jokes at an inappropriate moment. He is Nastya's boyfriend. In the alternate reality, he is shy and insecure but later regains his character back.
- Valeria Dmitrieva as Nastya - Lyosha's girlfriend who is often annoyed by her boyfriend's inappropriate jokes. In the alternate reality, she is originally Gosha's girlfriend but later returns to Alex due to the latter's revealed courage and inner strength.
- Anvar Khalilulaev as Gosha - a clever but yet frightened teenager. He and his group took his grandfather's car to get to Pripyat. In the alternate reality, his father is a high-ranked politician in the Moscow city council, which makes the boy more arrogant and spoiled. Portrayed as a cowardy and shallow, he shows true bravery and loyalty to his friends in tough times.
- Kristina Kazinskaya as Anya - a girl who joins the group to go to Chernobyl so as to find out what happened to her sister. She was originally from Chernobyl. In the alternate universe, she works as a flight attendant on a Sovaero (alternate Soviet airline) airplane.
- Yevgeny Stychkin as Sergey Kostenko - a KGB Captain (1986), blamed for the Chernobyl disaster, working as a PMC operator in Kharkov in 2013. In Alternative Russia in Season 2, he portrayed the Major-General of the Federal Security Service of Russia
- Mo Gallini as Jesus (Alternative America, season 2)

== Reception and ratings ==
The series was a big success. The viewership among audiences between 14 and 44 years was 28,4 % in Russia. The audiences between 18 and 30 the series took up 34,9 % of viewership. The ratings overtook those of the fourth season premiere of Kitchen.

On the first week of uploading the series to the Russian site Rutube, it gained more than 6 million views, a new record. Critical reception was also very positive. The series holds a rating of a 7.2 on KinoPoisk. The magazine "Hello" ranked it as one of the 12 best Russian TV series from fall 2014.
