= Vassili Nesterenko =

Belarusian physicist

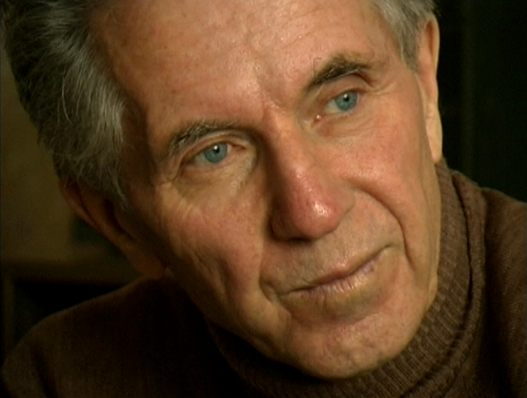
Vassili Nesterenko

Vassili Nesterenko (2 December 1934 – 25 August 2008) was a Soviet and Belarusian physicist from Ukraine and a former director of the Institute of Nuclear Energy at the National Academy of Sciences of Belarus (1977–1987).

== Biography ==
Vassili Nesterenko (sometimes romanized as Vasilii) was born in Krasny Kut Village, Antratsyt Raion, Luhansk Oblast, Ukrainian Soviet Socialist Republic (now Ukraine). He had a diploma from the Bauman Moscow State Technical University. In 1972 Nesterenko was elected a corresponding member of Academy of Sciences of Byelorussian Soviet Socialistic Republic in the field of Nuclear Power Plants. He worked on the consequences of the Chernobyl disaster.

Since 1990, he had been the director of the Belarusian Independent Institute of "Belrad", created in 1989 with the help of Andrei Sakharov, Ales Adamovich and Anatoly Karpov.

He attempted to warn the public of the dangerous radiation caused during the Chernobyl explosion. Because of his activities, he lost his job and got problems with the KGB.

Vassili Nesterenko died on 25 August 2008 at the age of 73 and was survived by his son.

== Work in Chernobyl ==
Nesterenko intervened immediately after news of the accident in the nuclear power plant started to spread. As an expert on the subject and with his experience as a fire fighter, he threw liquid nitrogen containers from a helicopter on the burning reactor core. To do this he had to move into the middle of radioactive smoke. Despite the heavy radioactive contamination of the area, Nesterenko survived. However, of the four passengers of his helicopter, three died from radioactive irradiation and contamination.

In 1990 Nesterenko founded the Institute of Radiation Safety (BELRAD), which carries out "radiation monitoring of the inhabitants of Chernobyl zone and their foodstuffs, development of measures on maintenance of radiation safety and protection of the population on territories, contaminated by radionuclides by realization of necessary scientific researches, development and organization of implementation of their results in practice."
