= Chernobyl (novel) =

1987 novel by Frederik Pohl

- Hardcover first edition cover
- Author: Frederik Pohl
- Language: English
- Genre: Historical fiction
- Published: August 1, 1987
- Publisher: Spectra
- Publication place: United States
- ISBN: 9780553052107

Chernobyl is a novel by Frederik Pohl published in 1987. It is based on the 1986 Chernobyl disaster.

== Plot summary ==
Chernobyl is a novel in which the characters must decide whether to use hastily produced substandard materials or to delay the reactor schedule while it is already overdue.

== Reception ==
Dave Langford reviewed Chernobyl for White Dwarf #98, and stated that "Avoiding Evil Empire stereotypes, Pohl does his own country a service by reminding us that lots of Americans detest the knee-jerk, anti-commie paranoia which sometimes seems to be the US national stereotype. The technical background is all there too, in palatable form."

== Reviews ==
- Review by Dan Chow (1987) in Locus, #318 July 1987
- Review by Don D'Ammassa (1987) in Science Fiction Chronicle, #96 September 1987
- Review by Algis Budrys (1987) in The Magazine of Fantasy & Science Fiction, November 1987
- Review by John Newsinger (1988) in Vector 142
- Review by Andy Robertson (1988) in Interzone, #23 Spring 1988
- Review by Andrew Andrews (1988) in Thrust, #31, Fall 1988
