= Chernobyl Forum =

Group of UN agencies

The Chernobyl Forum is the name of a group of UN agencies, founded on 3–5 February 2003 at the IAEA (International Atomic Energy Agency) Headquarters in Vienna, to scientifically assess the health effects and environmental consequences of the Chernobyl accident and to issue factual, authoritative reports on its environmental and health effects.

== Participants ==
Eight UN organizations are involved in the Chernobyl Forum:

- the IAEA (International Atomic Energy Agency)
- the FAO (Food and Agriculture Organization)
- the OCHA (United Nations Office for the Coordination of Humanitarian Affairs)
- the UNDP (United Nations Development Programme)
- the UNEP (United Nations Environment Programme)
- the UNSCEAR (United Nations Scientific Committee on the Effects of Atomic Radiation)
- the WHO (World Health Organization)
- the World Bank.

The Chernobyl Forum also comprises the governments of Belarus, Russia and Ukraine.

== Publications ==
The Chernobyl Forum released on 5 September 2005 a comprehensive scientific assessment report on the consequences of the Chernobyl accident titled: "Chernobyl’s Legacy: Health, Environmental and Socio-Economic Impacts". A revised edition was released in March 2006 and is available here, together with the Forum's report "Recommendations to the Governments of Belarus, the Russian Federation and Ukraine".

The report covers environmental radiation, human health and socio-economic aspects. About 100 recognized experts from many countries, including Belarus, Russia and Ukraine, have contributed. The report claims to be "the most comprehensive evaluation of the accident’s consequences to date" and to represents "a consensus view of the eight organizations of the UN family according to their competences and of the three affected countries".

On the death toll of the accident, the report states that 28 emergency workers died from acute radiation syndrome and 15 patients died from thyroid cancer. It roughly estimates that cancers deaths caused by the Chernobyl accident might eventually reach a total of up to 4,000 among the 600,000 cleanup workers or "liquidators" who received the greatest exposures.

One paper estimates an additional 5,000 deaths from the Chernobyl accident among the exposed population of around 6 million living in the contaminated areas of Ukraine, Belarus and Russia However, the paper notes that no significant increased cancer risk apart from thyroid cancer has been scientifically demonstrated to date; this prediction is only an indication of the possible impact of the accident, and should not be taken at face value.

The report quotes 4,000 cases of thyroid cancer resulting from the accident, mainly in children and adolescents at the time of the accident; however the survival rate is almost 99%. Since most emergency workers and people living in contaminated areas received relatively low radiation doses, comparable to natural background levels, no decrease in fertility or increase in congenital malformations have been observed.

The report indicates that many people were traumatised by the accident and the rapid relocation that followed; they remain anxious about their health, perceiving themselves as helpless victims rather than survivors, mainly because of the lack of credible information about the effects of the accident. The Chernobyl Forum recommends that relocated people be helped to normalise their lives and better access social services and employment.

The report also concluded that a greater risk than the long-term effects of radiation exposure, is the risk to mental health caused by exaggerated fears about the effects of radiation:

" ... The designation of the affected population as “victims” rather than “survivors” has led them to perceive themselves as helpless, weak and lacking control over their future. This, in turn, has led either to over cautious behavior and exaggerated health concerns, or to reckless conduct, such as consumption of mushrooms, berries and game from areas still designated as highly contaminated, overuse of alcohol and tobacco, and unprotected promiscuous sexual activity."

== See also ==
- Chernobyl disaster
- Chernobyl disaster effects
- List of Chernobyl-related articles
- Nuclear power debate
