= The Truth About Chernobyl =

1991 book by Grigori Medvedev

- Author: Grigori Medvedev
- Subject: Chernobyl disaster
- Publication date: 1991
- ISBN: 978-0465087761

The Truth About Chernobyl is a 1991 book by Grigori Medvedev. Medvedev served as deputy chief engineer at the No. 1 reactor unit of the Chernobyl Nuclear Power Plant while the plant was under construction. At the time of the Chernobyl disaster in 1986, Medvedev was deputy director of the main industrial department in the Soviet Ministry of Energy dealing with the construction of nuclear power stations. Since Medvedev knew the Chernobyl plant well, he was sent back as a special investigator immediately after the 1986 catastrophe.

In his book, Medvedev provides extensive first-hand testimony, based on many interviews, describing minute by minute precisely what was and was not done both before and after the explosion. It has been described as a tragic tale of pervasive, institutionalized, bureaucratic incompetence leading up to the accident; and heroic, heartbreaking sacrifice among those who had to deal with the emergency afterwards.

The book is written not in a documentary style but in a very personal style, often speaking in the first person. While it includes extensive direct quotes from some of those who survived the disaster, it does not include references beyond a bare seven footnotes.

In 1991, it was awarded the Los Angeles Times Book Prize, Science and technology.

== See also ==
- List of books about nuclear issues
- List of Chernobyl-related articles
- Chernobyl: Consequences of the Catastrophe for People and the Environment
