= Please Remain Calm (Chernobyl) =

- Chernobyl episode
- Valery Legasov and Boris Shcherbina observe a military squad of three helicopters carrying tons of sand and boron, flying close to the reactor to put out the fire, moments before one of them crashes.
- Episode no.: Episode 2
- Directed by: Johan Renck
- Written by: Craig Mazin
- Cinematography by: Jakob Ihre
- Editing by: Jinx Godfrey
- Original air dates: May 13, 2019 (United States); May 14, 2019 (United Kingdom)
- Running time: 65 minutes

Guest appearances
- Karl Davies as Viktor Proskuryakov; Donald Sumpter as Zharkov; Nadia Clifford as Svetlana Zinchenko; Oscar Giese as Boris Baranov; Michael Socha as Mikhail; Natasha Radski as Russian News Reader; Peter Guinness as Major Burov

Episode chronology
← Previous "1:23:45"	Next → "Open Wide, O Earth"

"Please Remain Calm" is the second episode of the historical drama television miniseries Chernobyl, which details the nuclear disaster that occurred on April 26, 1986, and the consequences that everyone involved faced. The episode was directed by Johan Renck and written by the series creator Craig Mazin, and aired on HBO in the United States on May 13, 2019 and on Sky Atlantic in the United Kingdom and Ireland on May 14, 2019.

The episode takes place seven hours after the explosion detailing the consequences of the explosion of the reactor 4 at the Chernobyl Nuclear Power Plant. Inorganic chemist Valery Legasov and a Council of Ministers' deputy chairman Boris Shcherbina are sent to Chernobyl to investigate the incident where they discover that the situation is way worse than what they expected, risking the lives of millions including the citizens. Meanwhile, Ulana Khomyuk finds out about the incident and realizes that unless actions are taken, a second explosion could happen due to the contact between hot nuclear material and pooling water in the basement of the nuclear plant.

Mazin started to research for the project in 2014, reading several books and government reports that detail the events that happened during the explosion and its aftermath. He also interviewed nuclear scientists and former Soviet citizens to understand how a nuclear reactor works and get a better idea of the culture in 1986. A companion podcast for the miniseries for each episode was released alongside the release of each episode, with the second one being with "Please Remain Calm" being released on May 13, 2019.

The episode received critical acclaim with praise towards the performances of Harris and Skarsgård, script, cinematography, direction, atmosphere, musical score, and the portrayal of the aftermath of the explosion. The initial broadcast of the episode through HBO drew over 1 million viewers in the United States, while in the United Kingdom though Sky UK it managed to attract over 891,000 viewers. The episode won three Primetime Creative Arts Emmy Awards and was nominated for a Primetime Emmy Award for Skarsgård's performance.

== Plot ==
Seven hours after the incident, Ulana Khomyuk and her associate discover a spike in radiation levels in Minsk that suggests an incident must have happened at the Ignalina Nuclear Plant. After confirming nothing happened in Ignalina, she attempts but fails to reach Chernobyl's staff, leading her to realize that Chernobyl is the source. She meets the Minsk executive committee leader to get information but is rebuffed. Realizing that her concerns are being ignored, she heads to Chernobyl, giving the committee's receptionist a bottle of pills to counteract radiation and warning her to go as far away from the city as possible.

In Pripyat, the hospital is overloaded with firefighters and citizens suffering from acute radiation syndrome (ARS). After a nurse realizes the firefighters have severe radiation burns, she has her staff remove their equipment and dump their soiled clothing in a locked room in the basement. A distressed Lyudmilla Ignatenko manages to bypass the security of the hospital but finds out that her husband is being air lifted to another hospital in Moscow alongside other ARS patients.

In Moscow, Valery Legasov becomes concerned after reading a report that details events occurring after the explosion. During the committee meeting, the members disregard the severity of the explosion because they were told the radiation level was not dangerous. Legasov points out several mistakes in the report and suggests that the levels of radiation could be higher than expected if the core is exposed. Convinced of Legasov's expertise, Mikhail Gorbachev sends him to investigate Chernobyl alongside a skeptical Boris Shcherbina.

While traveling in the helicopter, Legasov realizes the core is exposed after seeing the blue glow of radiation-ionized air and nuclear graphite on the roof. Outside the plant, Legasov and Shcherbina confront Viktor Bryukhanov and Nikolai Fomin about the incident. After they accuse Legasov of spreading misinformation, Shcherbina inquires about the graphite and radiation exposure. When they cannot answer, Shcherbina decides to test radiation levels using a high-range dosimeter. General Vladimir Pikalov drives around the plant taking readings, which reveal that radiation levels are not 3.6 roentgen, but 15,000. Finally realizing Legasov was correct, Shcherbina has Bryukhanov and Fomin arrested. Legasov suggests putting out the fire with sand and boron. The next day, a squadron of helicopters flies 5,000 tons of sand and boron to the reactor. One of the helicopters crashes into the core, but Shcherbina orders the helicopters to continue to drop the sand and boron.

Dissatisfied that the city has not been evacuated, Legasov tells Shcherbina that despite their distance from the core, they are still absorbing high-levels of radiation and will likely be dead in five years. A shocked Shcherbina receives a phone call, which informs them that the radiation has been detected as far away as Germany and Sweden and that the Americans have taken satellite images of the disaster. With the knowledge that Western governments now know of the disaster, the city of Pripyat is finally evacuated.

Arriving in Pripyat, Khomyuk meets Legasov and Shcherbina and tells them about the risk of a bigger steam explosion from contact between hot nuclear material and water in the basement underneath the reactor, which occurred due to both the attempts to put out the fire and the opened water valves. If the explosion were to occur, the blast would destroy the three remaining reactors, decimating the surrounding area and spreading high levels of radiation across all of Eastern Europe.

Legasov and Shcherbina return to Moscow with Khomyuk and inform Gorbachev of the impending disaster and their solution: to send three plant workers with knowledge of the plumbing systems into the basement of the plant to close the valves and drain the water. As the basement is highly contaminated, it will be a suicide mission. Gorbachev grants Legasov permission to go ahead with the plan. At the Chernobyl plant, Legasov and Shcherbina meet with plant workers who initially refuse to volunteer even with promises of large bonuses. When Shcherbina tells of the consequences if it is not done, Alexei Ananenko, Valeri Bezpalov, and Boris Baranov volunteer. The three are sent to the basement where their flashlights start to fail, leaving them in darkness.

== Production ==
=== Development ===
When Craig Mazin expressed interest on creating a show based on the Chernobyl disaster, he wanted to portray it as accurately as possible, leading him to read books and interview nuclear scientists. While researching for the show he stated: "Well, at the heart of this story is a question about what happens when we disconnect from the truth. And the Soviet system was essentially an enormous monument to the useful lie. They made lying an art: They lied to each other, they lied to the people above them, they lied to the people below them, and they did it out of a sense of survival. Ultimately, it just became expected, and the truth was debased. When it did kind of peek its head out, it was attacked. So I thought the worst possible thing I could do in telling a story like that would be to contribute to that problem by over-fictionalizing, over-dramatizing." The show entered development in 2017, when HBO and Sky UK ordered the production of the series with Johan Renck set to direct the five episodes of the show.

Despite the show portraying the events mostly accurately, some artistic licences were taken for dramatic purposes. In the episode, a helicopter crashes while attempting to throw sand on the exposed reactor. While the crash indeed happened, it was two weeks after the explosion. Mazin stated: "I wanted people to know that this was one of the hazards that these pilots were dealing with — an open reactor. Radiation was flying over it." The scene of the crash was not originally in the episode, as it was added during the post-production of the series. Lead actor Jared Harris said, "It's something that's not there, but you both need to be doing it in synchronicity, so you have to be doing it at the same time, looking at the same thing, and you have to understand what's happening."

=== Casting ===
Emily Watson was confirmed to have joined the series as Ulana Khomyuk, along with Stellan Skarsgård. This would make the second collaboration of the actors after working together in the 1996 film Breaking the Waves. Skarsgard expresses: "Nobody would see it as a privilege to spend five months in a dilapidated nuclear plant, unless it was to play in a script like this by Craig Mazin, work with a director like Johan Renck, collaborate with a producer like Jane Featherstone, jam with an actor like Jared Harris and finally be at the feet of Emily Watson whom I have been missing for some 20 years." Unlike other characters of the series who existed in the real-life, Watson's character is a fictional character created for the television series. This was with the intention of honoring all the scientists that aided Legasov during the investigation. Mazin stated: "One area where the Soviets were actually more progressive than we were was in the area of science and medicine. The Soviet Union had quite a large percentage of female doctors."

=== Filming ===
Principal photography began in April 2018 in Lithuania, whose architecture still resembled that of the Soviet Union. In order to portray the city of Pripyat for the series, filming took place at the residential district of Fabijoniškės in the city of Vilnius. Several scenes of the meeting of the council were filmed at the former Government Guest House in Vilnius, which also kept its Soviet architecture. Scenes set at the hotel were also filmed at the Government Guest House, while the interior was filmed at the Cultural and Sports Centre of the Lithuanian Ministry.

=== Title meaning ===
The episode's title refers to the famous phrase "please remain calm", which is used in cases of emergency to keep people calm. This phrase, however, was not used until the evacuation of Pripyat concluded, through the loudspeakers on the military vehicles. It is still unclear if the broadcast said "please remain calm" or "please keep calm".

== Reception ==
=== Ratings ===
"Please Remain Calm" was first broadcast in the United States through HBO on May 13, 2019, where it was seen by 1,004 million viewers and received a 0.32 rating in the 18-49 demographics; this was a 32% increase from the previous episode, which was watched by 0,756 viewers with a 0.19 in the 18-49 demographics. It was followed by its airing in the United Kingdom and Republic of Ireland through Sky Atlantic on May 14, 2019, where it obtained a total of 891,000 viewers.

=== Critical response ===
"Please Remain Calm" received acclaim from critics. Lorraine Ali from the Los Angeles Times lauded Jared Harris's performance commenting that "Harris is hands down the most deserving of an award for his performance in Chernobyl. The miniseries was a dramatic success of nuclear proportions, a grim story turned into a must-watch historical drama by a team of folks at the top of their game." Euan Ferguson from The Guardian lauded the show for Harris's performance and its atmosphere, saying "[t]his enthralling, quietly spectacular, meticulously researched five-part series landed a mite irritatingly on Sky Atlantic, which many people don't have. But I would still urge you – leapfrog your qualms, and invest at least in a Now TV stick, which will let you get it (and Game of Thrones)." Pat Stacey from Irish Independent rated the show with 5 stars and stated "Writer Craig Mazin, best known before now for writing the comedy The Hangover and its sequels, and director Johan Renck have crafted an unflinching, devastatingly powerful drama with the tautness of a thriller and the chilling veracity of a documentary."

Charles Mudede from The Stranger praised the show for its historical accuracy. "It is likely that the future will see that Chernobyl left a much deeper and longer impression on culture than Bill Nye's burning of the iconic schoolroom earth. In fact, it is not hard to believe at this point that the total cultural impact of Chernobyl will be associated with that made in the Cold War era (when the world continuously faced nuclear holocaust) by the three-hour 1983 television film The Day After." Alison de Souza from The Straits Times praised the episode for accurately recreating all the events that happened during the catastrophe, giving it 4 stars of 5. "The gripping five-part miniseries, Chernobyl manages to viscerally recreate it - the horror, heroism and sheer folly of it all." Ben Travers from IndieWire praised the performances of Harris and Skarsgård by rating it with a grade of A− and stated "Chernobyl won't be for everyone. With constant, low-simmering intensity and an all-too-visible air of death, the vivid recreation of an unimaginable disaster can be uncomfortable to say the least. But Mazin and Renck do an impressive job of inviting the audience into a story filled with so many horrors. Each nauseating moment, be it a shot of decaying human flesh or a decision made for the wrong reasons, has a purpose — and pays back the viewer for their investment. Chernobyl is a stunning dramatization, and one worth admiring on many levels."

=== Accolades ===
Year	Award	Category	Nominee	Result	Ref.
2020	Costume Designers Guild Awards	Excellence in Period Television	Odile Dicks-Mireaux (for "Please Remain Calm")	Nominated	
2020	Primetime Emmy Awards	Outstanding Supporting Actor in a Limited Series or Movie	Stellan Skarsgård (for "Please Remain Calm")	Nominated	
2020	Primetime Creative Arts Emmy Awards	Outstanding Cinematography for a Limited Series or Movie	Jakob Ihre (for "Please Remain Calm")	Won	
2020	Primetime Creative Arts Emmy Awards	Outstanding Period Costumes	Odile Dicks-Mireaux, Holly McLean, Daiva Petrulyte, Anna Munro and Sylvie Org (for "Please Remain Calm")	Nominated	
2020	Primetime Creative Arts Emmy Awards	Outstanding Music Composition for a Limited Series, Movie, or Special (Original Dramatic Score)	Hildur Guðnadóttir (for "Please Remain Calm")	Won	
2020	Primetime Creative Arts Emmy Awards	Outstanding Single-Camera Picture Editing for a Limited Series or Movie	Simon Smith (for "Please Remain Calm")	Won	
