= Mykola Melnyk =

Hero of the Soviet Union

Nikolai Melnik
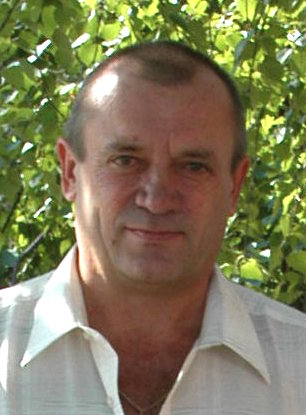
- Melnyk in 2006
- Born: December 17, 1953; Stavysche, Kyiv Oblast, Ukrainian SSR, Soviet Union
- Died: July 26, 2013 (aged 59); Alicante, Spain
- Military career
- Allegiance: Soviet Union; Ukraine
- Conflicts: Chernobyl disaster relief operation
- Awards: Hero of the Soviet Union; Order of Lenin; Igor I. Sikorsky Award for Humanitarian Service
- Other work: Test pilot, aerial firefighting pilot

Mykola Mykolayovych Melnyk (Ukrainian: Микола Миколайович Мельник; 17 December 1953 – 26 July 2013), also known as Nikolai Melnik, was a Soviet-Ukrainian pilot and liquidator hero known for his high-risk helicopter mission on the dangerously-radioactive Chernobyl Nuclear Power Plant building immediately after the 1986 Chernobyl disaster.

For this operation, he was awarded the title of Hero of the Soviet Union, and the Igor I. Sikorsky Award for Humanitarian Service.

== Early life ==
Mykola Melnyk was born on December 17, 1953, and grew up in the town of Stavyshche in the Kyiv Oblast in Ukraine (at that time the Ukrainian Soviet Socialist Republic). Upon his school graduation, Melnyk worked as a sports coach, and later as a telephone station technician in Stavyshche, later moving to Zaporizhia for a construction job. In 1972–74 he served his conscript service in the Soviet Armed Forces.

== Pilot career ==
In 1979 Mykola Melnyk graduated from the Civil Aviation Pilot School (KLUGA) in Kremenchuk and began working as a civilian helicopter pilot in different cities. Later he continued his education at the Kremenchuk Department of the Kharkiv Polytechnic Institute and the Civil Aviation Academy in Leningrad. After graduation from the special test pilot school in 1984, Melnyk worked as a test pilot, particularly for the Kamov helicopter design bureau in Feodosiya.

== Chernobyl mission ==
After the April 1986 Chernobyl disaster, Melnyk was directed to work in the cleanup operations. Lethal levels of radiation created after the Reactor #4 fire prevented ground liquidator teams from most operations on the roof of the power plant building. However, helicopters could reach and leave the area above the building within seconds, thus inflicting less health damage to the personnel on board. They were employed to cover building openings with sandbags and lead slabs, install necessary equipment, commence aerial photography and atmospheric radioactive contamination monitoring.

Melnyk, among others, was assigned to such missions as an experienced civilian helicopter pilot. He flew 46 sorties over the reactor building, for a combined total duration of 52 hours. The most important of those sorties was the so-called "Operation Igla" (Operation Needle), the June 19, 1986, installation of a giant 18-metre (59 ft)-long radiation probe on top of the building by means of a precision drop from a Kamov coaxial rotor helicopter. This operation was described as dropping a "needle" into a precise spot; it was considered especially difficult. When Melnyk successfully completed the operation during a training exercise in Moscow, the observers broke into applause. Melnyk did not know the purpose of the training, however, until several days later when he flew to Kyiv to undertake the actual mission. The first attempt to insert the "needle" into the actual reactor was foiled by a frozen crust above the target; Melnyk succeeded on the third try.

According to the "Remembrance Book" by the Chornobyl Museum, Melnyk participated in the 'liquidator' operations on site of the disaster from May 20, 1986, until September 9, 1986. In 1994, he underwent two surgeries related to health problems attributed to his radiation exposure.

== Subsequent aviation career and death ==
Upon return from Chernobyl mission, Melnyk continued his work as a test pilot at the Kamov helicopter testing center in Feodosiya until 1992. In independent Ukraine, the facility was reorganized as a separate Feodosiya Kamov Research and Production Enterprise "Vertolit" (Феодосійське науково-виробниче об'єднання "Вертоліт" імені Камова).

Some time after the fall of the Soviet Union, Melnyk co-founded a cargo airline in Kyiv. The company operated Antonov An-24 airplanes and Kamov helicopters as a subcontractor for DHL and United Parcel Service. However, he gradually became disappointed with the business, citing lack of sustainable demand for his helicopter specialization.

In 1995, Spanish airline Helicopteros del Sureste approached Melnyk for help with purchase of Soviet-made helicopters. Melnyk used the opportunity to move to Alicante (Spain), where he became contracted as a pilot and instructor specializing in Soviet-designed helicopters with the Helicopteros del Sureste. He trained at least 25 local pilots and also has worked in aerial firefighting. As of 2006, Melnyk had 13,400 recorded flight hours.

According to a Ukrainian regional newspaper, Mykola Melnyk died in Spain on July 26, 2013 from leukemia.

== Recognition and awards ==
=== Soviet awards ===
Melnyk was awarded the title Hero of the Soviet Union, by Decree of the Presidium of the Supreme Soviet of the USSR issued on October 6, 1987, for his "courage, heroism and self-sacrifice displayed during liquidation of the Chernobyl NPP accident consequences". Along with the title of "Hero", he received the Soviet Order of Lenin and Gold Star Medal.

=== International awards ===
In 1990, as part of its "Salute to Excellence" awards program, the Helicopter Association International honored Melnyk (as Nikolai Melnik) with its Igor I. Sikorsky Award for Humanitarian Service. The Sikorsky award is presented annually to one or more persons "who best demonstrate(s) the value of civil rotorcraft to society by saving lives, protecting property, and aiding those in distress". The award to Melnyk recognized his efforts as a Chernobyl 'liquidator'. The award committee specified that Melnyk was recognized as a representative of "all the valiant aircrews who participated in relief efforts following the Chernobyl nuclear power station accident".

In Spain Melnyk received a Spanish royal award for aerial firefighting.
