= Heli-Expo =

Annual helicopter exhibition in Atlanta, Georgia, U.S.

- Status: Active
- Genre: Helicopter convention
- Begins: March 4, 2019
- Ends: March 7, 2019
- Frequency: Annually
- Venue: Georgia World Congress Center
- Locations: Atlanta, Georgia
- Attendance: 20,393 (2013)
- Organizer: Helicopter Association International
- Website: www.rotor.org/Home/HELI-EXPO

Heli-Expo is the largest helicopter exhibition in the world. It is organized by the Helicopter Association International. In 2013, it attracted 20,393 visitors from all over the world. It is one of the largest gatherings of the industry it is often the place where innovations are introduced.

Both new and older model helicopters are on display at the show, as well as parts, accessories, upgrade kits, and information about services.

In 2016 Heli-Expo was held in Louisville, Kentucky for the first time.
