= Salute to Excellence =

Salute to Excellence is a category of awards issued by the Helicopter Association International since 1960, "for outstanding achievements in the international helicopter community".

== Individual awards ==
Aviation Maintenance Technician Award (since 1994)
Aviation Repair Specialist Award (since 1995)
Igor I. Sikorsky Award for Humanitarian Service (since 1989; incorporates the former Crew of the Year Award)
- 1990 Mykola Melnyk for his service as a Chernobyl liquidator
- 2015 Portuguese Air Force 751 Squadron - S&R
Crew of the Year (1980–1995)
The Joe Mashman Safety Award (since 1987)
- 2015 Edwin McConkey - Approach Software
Outstanding Certified Flight Instructor Award (since 1985)
- 2015 Simon Spencer-Bower Wanaka Helicopters
Agusta Westland Community Service Award (since 1990)
Raise Your Sites! Award (1983–1988)
Max Schumacher Memorial Award (1967–1988)
Fly Neighborly Award (1982–1988)
Airbus Golden Hour Award (since 1982)
- 2015 Snohomish Co
Excellence in Communications Award (since 1975)
- 2015 Micheal Hirschburg - Vertiflite
Helicopter Maintenance Award (since 1973)
- 2015 Patrick Cox - Robinson Helicopter Company
MD Helicopters Law Enforcement Award (since 1972)
- 2015 U.S. Park Police Eagle One
Lawrence D. Bell Memorial Award (since 1971)
Robert E. Trimble Memorial Award (since 1961)
Appareo Systems Pilot of the Year Award (since 1960)
- 2015 Gary Dahlen - King Fire
Bell Helicopter Lifetime Achievement
- 2015 Lou Bartolotta

== See also ==
- List of aviation awards
