= 22nd Costume Designers Guild Awards =

Award ceremony for film and television costuming in 2019

- Date: January 28, 2020
- Location: The Beverly Hilton, Beverly Hills, California
- Country: United States
- Presented by: Costume Designers Guild
- Hosted by: Mindy Kaling

Highlights
- Excellence in Contemporary Film: Knives Out – Jenny Eagan
- Excellence in Period Film: Jojo Rabbit – Mayes C. Rubeo
- Excellence in Sci-Fi/Fantasy Film: Maleficent: Mistress of Evil – Ellen Mirojnick

The 22nd Costume Designers Guild Awards, honoring the best costume designs in film, television, and media for 2019, took place on January 28, 2020. The nominees were announced on December 10, 2019.

== Winners and nominees ==
The winners are in bold.

=== Film ===
Excellence in Contemporary Film	Excellence in Period Film
**Knives Out – Jenny Eagan**; A Beautiful Day in the Neighborhood – Arjun Bhasin; Hustlers – Mitchell Travers; The Laundromat – Ellen Mirojnick; Queen & Slim – Shiona Turini	**Jojo Rabbit – Mayes C. Rubeo**; Dolemite Is My Name – Ruth E. Carter; Downton Abbey – Anna Mary Scott Robbins; Once Upon a Time in Hollywood – Arianne Phillips; Rocketman – Julian Day
Excellence in Sci-Fi/Fantasy Film
**Maleficent: Mistress of Evil – Ellen Mirojnick**; Aladdin – Michael Wilkinson; Avengers: Endgame – Michael Wilkinson; Captain Marvel – Sanja M. Hays; Star Wars: The Rise of Skywalker – Michael Kaplan

=== Television ===
Excellence in Contemporary Television	Excellence in Period Television
**Schitt's Creek: "The Dress" – Debra Hanson**; Big Little Lies: "She Knows" – Alix Friedberg; Fleabag: "2.1" – Ray Holman; Killing Eve: "Desperate Times" – Charlotte Mitchell; Russian Doll: "Superiority Complex" – Jennifer Rogien	**The Marvelous Mrs. Maisel: "It's Comedy or Cabbage" – Donna Zakowska**; Chernobyl: "Please Remain Calm" – Odile Dicks-Mireaux; The Crown: "Cri De Coeur" – Amy Roberts; Fosse/Verdon: "Life Is a Cabaret" – Melissa Toth and Joseph La Corte; GLOW: "Freaky Tuesday" – Beth Morgan
Excellence in Sci-Fi/Fantasy Television	Excellence in Variety, Reality-Competition, Live Television
**Game of Thrones: "The Iron Throne" – Michele Clapton**; Carnival Row: "Aisling" – Joanna Eatwell; The Handmaid's Tale: "Household" – Natalie Bronfman; A Series of Unfortunate Events: "Penultimate Peril: Part 2" – Cynthia Summers; Watchmen: "It's Summer and We're Running Out of Ice" – Sharen Davis	**The Masked Dancer: "Season Finale: And the Winner Takes It All and Takes It Off" – Marina Toybina**; Dancing with the Stars: "First Elimination" – Daniela Gschwendtner and Steven Norman Lee; The Late Late Show with James Corden: "Crosswalk the Musical: Aladdin" – Lauren Shapiro; RuPaul's Drag Race: "Whatcha Unpackin?" – Zaldy; Saturday Night Live: "Sandra Oh/Tame Impala" – Tom Broecker and Eric Justian

=== Short Form ===
Excellence in Short Form Design
- **United Airlines: "Star Wars Wing Walker" commercial – Christopher Lawrence**
  - Katy Perry: "Small Talk" music video – Phoenix Mellow
  - Kohler Verdera Voice Smart Mirror: "Mirror, Mirror" commercial – Ami Goodheart
  - Lil Nas X: "Old Town Road" music video – Catherine Hahn
  - Madonna: "God Control" music video – B. Åkerlund

=== Special awards ===
==== Career Achievement Award ====
- Michael Kaplan

==== Spotlight Award ====
- Charlize Theron

==== Distinguished Collaborator Award ====
- Adam McKay

==== Distinguished Service Award ====
- Mary Ellen Fields
