= Ukrainian National Chernobyl Museum =

Museum in Kyiv, Ukraine

- Національний музей "Чорнобиль"
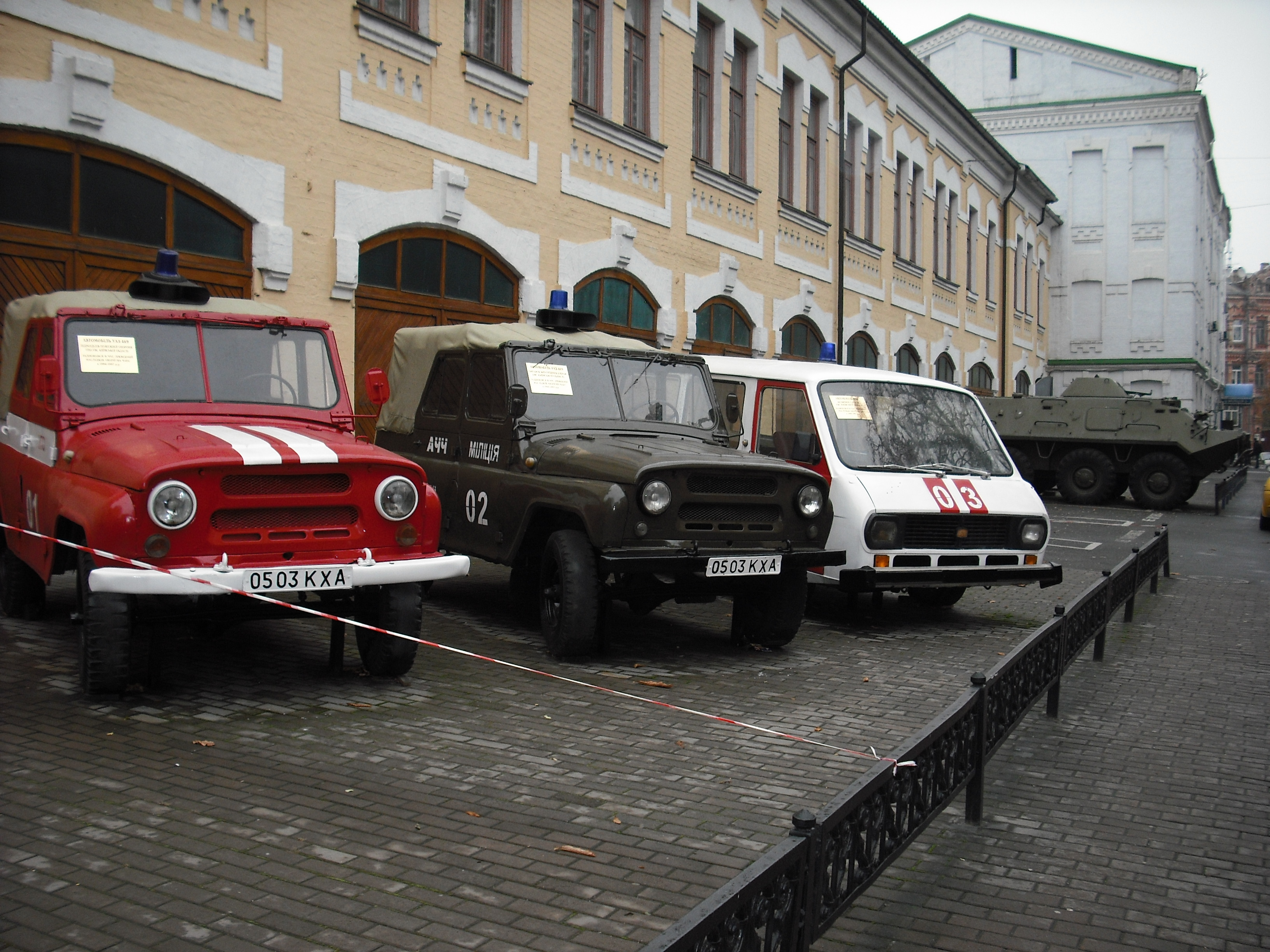
- The museum facade and outdoor exhibition of Liquidator vehicles (prior to the destruction)

- Location within Ukraine
- Established: 25 April 1992
- Location: provulok Khoryva, 1 (провул. Хорива, 1), Kyiv, Ukraine
- Coordinates: 50.466389°N 30.517222°E
- Collection size: 7,000+
- Director: Ivan Gladush
- Public transit access: Kontraktova Ploshcha Metro Station ( Obolonsko–Teremkivska line); Tram Routes 12, 14, 18, 19
- Website: www.chornobylmuseum.kiev.ua

The Ukrainian National Chernobyl Museum (titled in Ukrainian: Національний музей «Чорнобиль», romanized: Natsionalnyi muzey "Chornobyl' ") was a history museum in Kyiv, Ukraine, dedicated to the 1986 Chernobyl disaster and its consequences. The museum occupied an early 20th-century building which formerly housed a fire brigade and was donated in 1992 by the State Fire Protection Guard. It was destroyed by a Russian missile and drone attack on Kyiv cultural institutions on 24 May 2026.

== Exhibitions ==
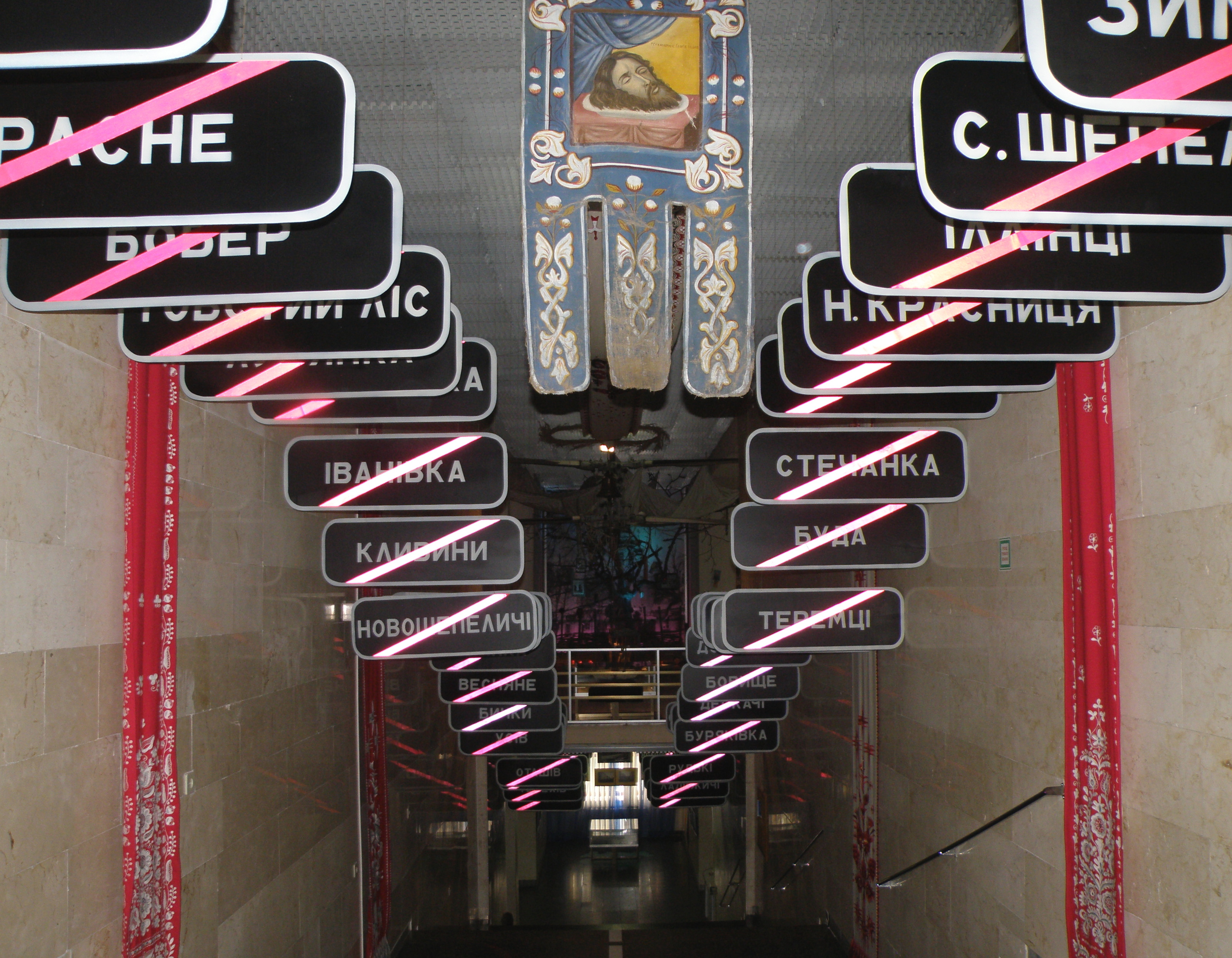
Symbolic display of road signs for the villages abandoned as a result of the disaster. To stress the tragedy of devastation, the signs were colored in black (instead of standard blue/white) and slashed with pink stripe (which designates "end of the settlement" on the actual signs). Above the signs was an authentic Khorugv from the abandoned village church.

The museum housed an extensive collection of visual media, artifacts, scale models, and other items. It was designed to educate the public about the many aspects of the disaster. Several exhibits depicted the technical progression of the accident. There were also many areas dedicated to the loss of life and cultural ramifications of the disaster.

== Liquidator Remembrance Book ==
The museum supported the "Remembrance Book" (Ukrainian: Книга пам'яті, Knyha Pam'yati) – a unique online database of Liquidators (Chernobyl disaster management personnel, some of whom sacrificed their lives) featuring personal pages with photos and brief structured information written on these pages. Data fields included "Radiation damage suffered", "Field of liquidation activity" and "Subsequent fate". The project started in 1997, containing over 5,000 entries as of February, 2013. The database is available in the Ukrainian language only. The "Remembrance Book" is neither the only or official database on the Liquidators, but probably the only one open to the public on the internet.

== Funding and patrons ==
The museum was founded and supported by the government of Ukraine and the local government of Kyiv. Private and foreign donations were also common. The museum also received funding from the Japanese government.

== Location and public transport access ==
The museum was located at 1 Khoryva Lane (provulok Khoryva, 1), in historic Podil neighborhood of the city centre. The nearest Kyiv Metro station was Kontraktova Ploshcha station on the Kontraktova Square, where various Kyiv trams, bus and marshrutka routes came together. Car parking space near the museum was very limited.

== Destruction ==
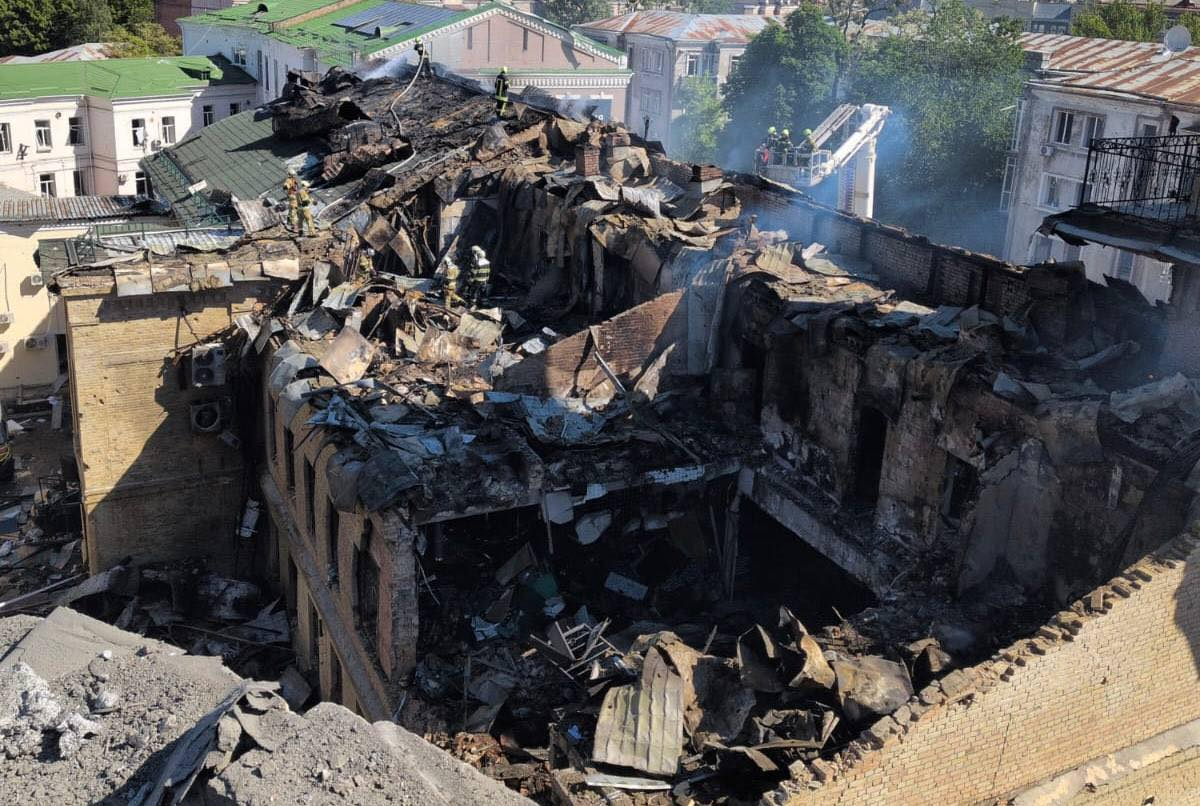
Damaged museum building after Russian attack (2026)

On 24 May 2026, just one month after having been modernised and reopened to the public, the museum was almost completely destroyed by a direct hit of a Russian missile, followed by a fire and a partial collapse. About 40 percent of the collection was rescued from storage. Ukrainian President Volodymyr Zelenskyy visited the scene on the same day.

== Gallery ==
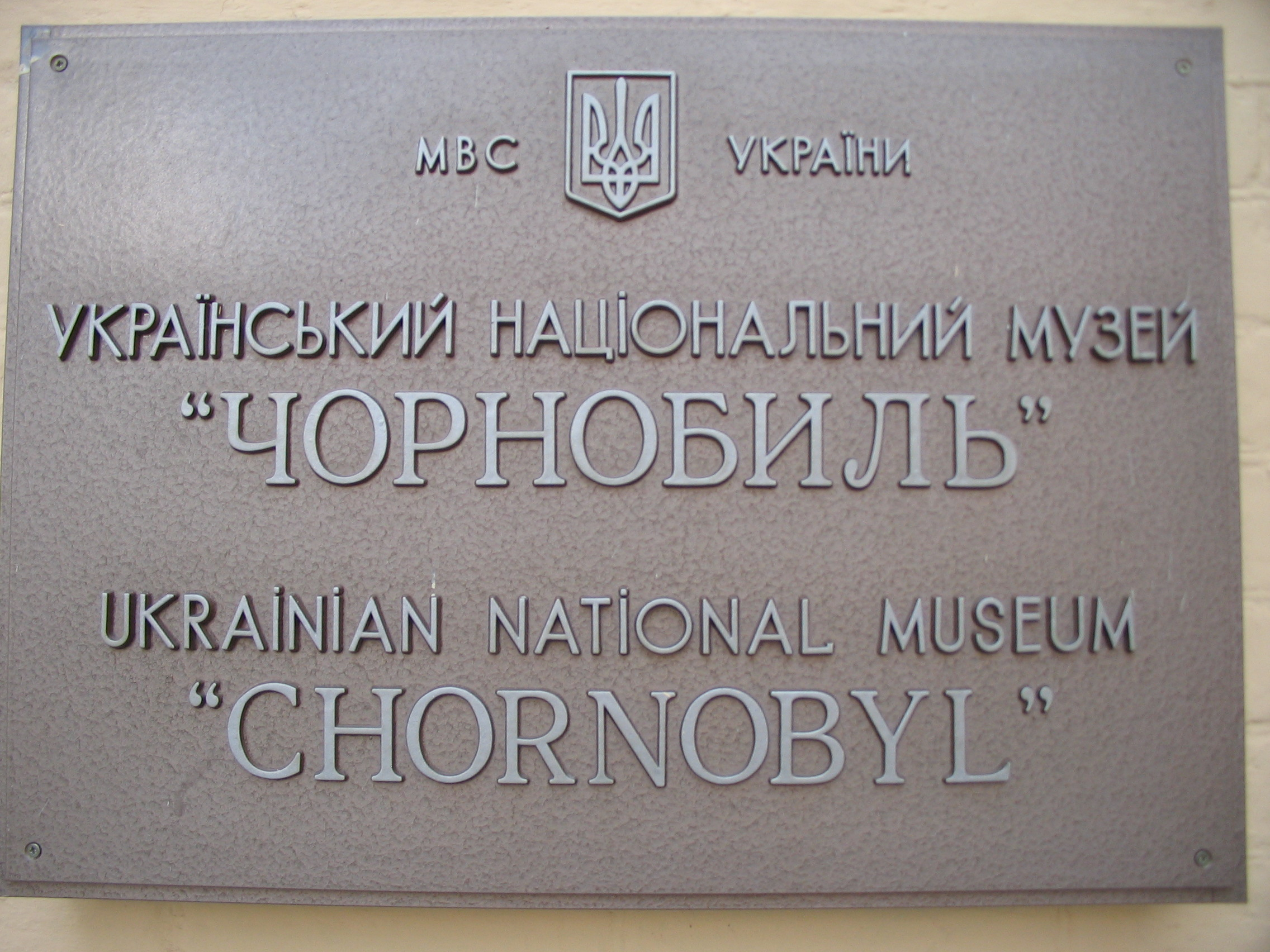
The sign to the Chornobyl museum

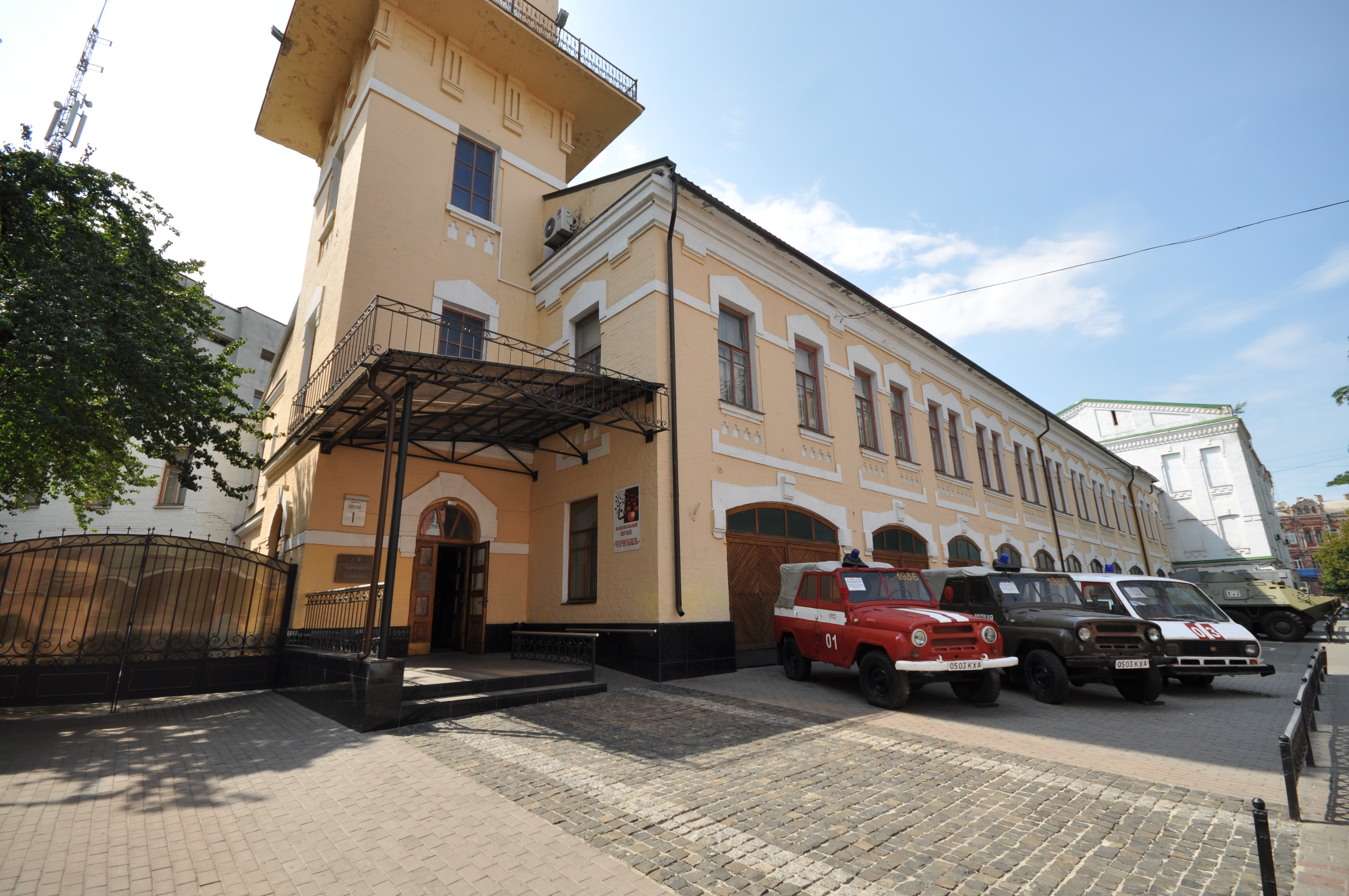
Museum's exterior

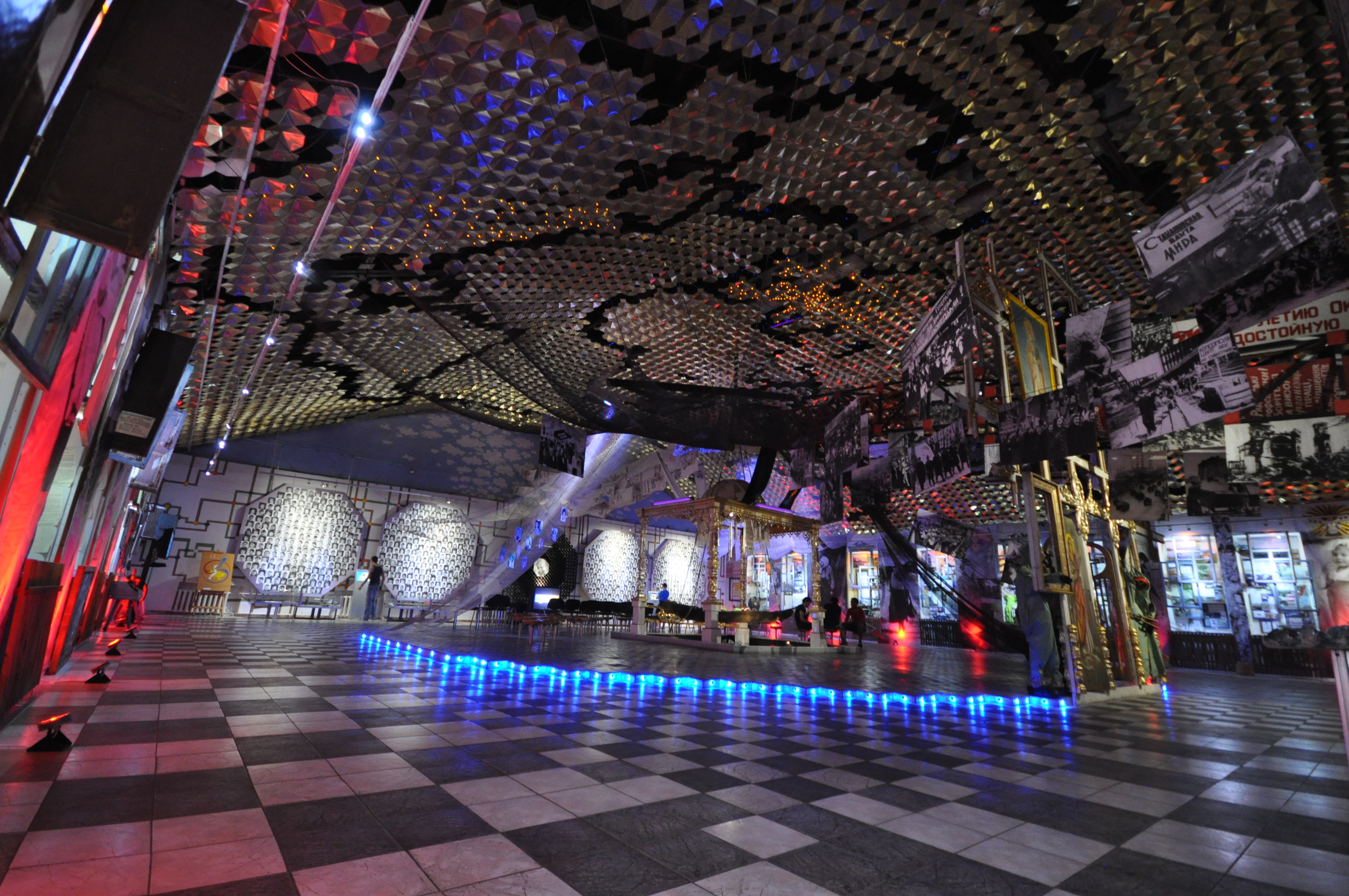
Museum's interior

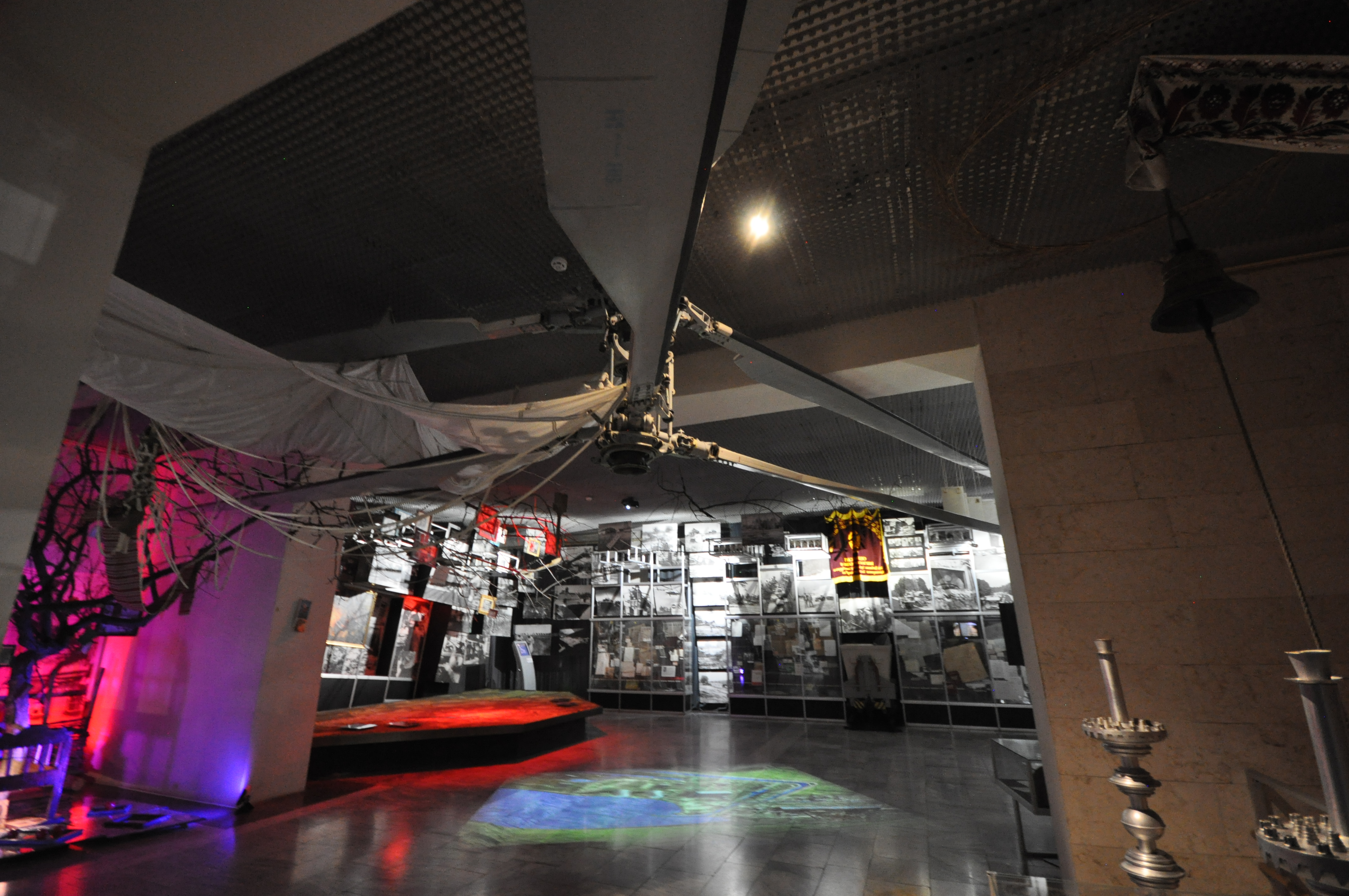

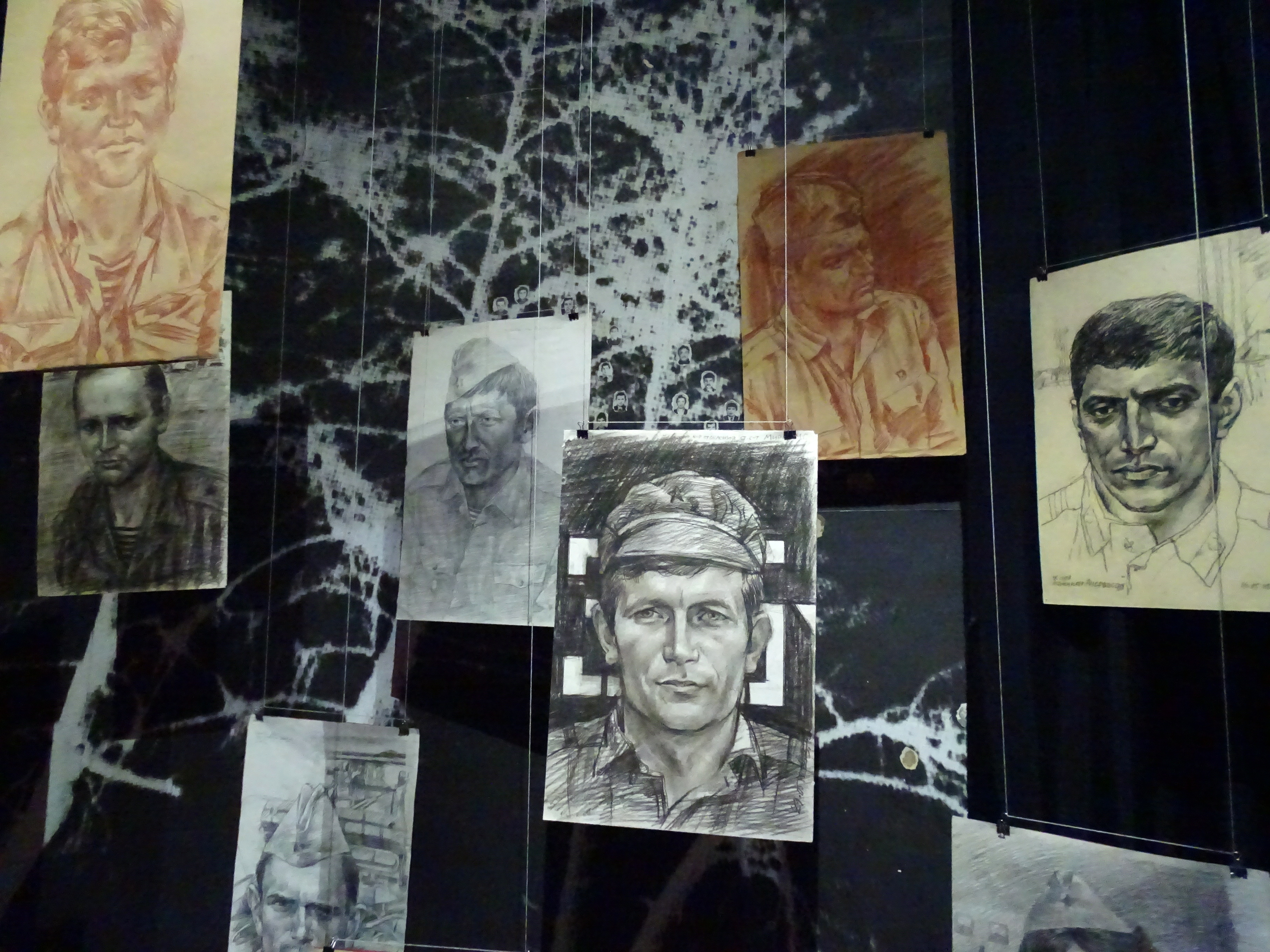

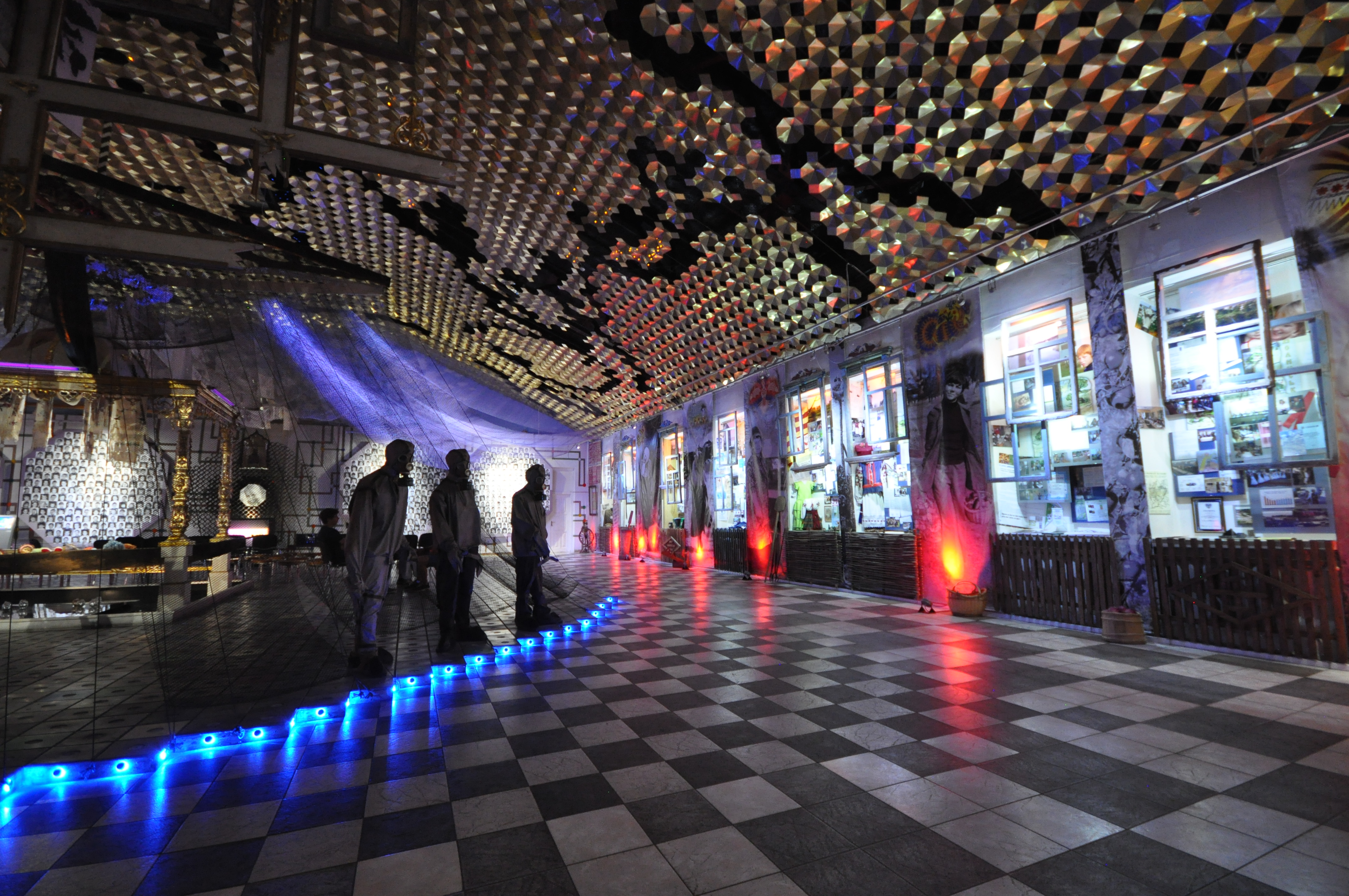

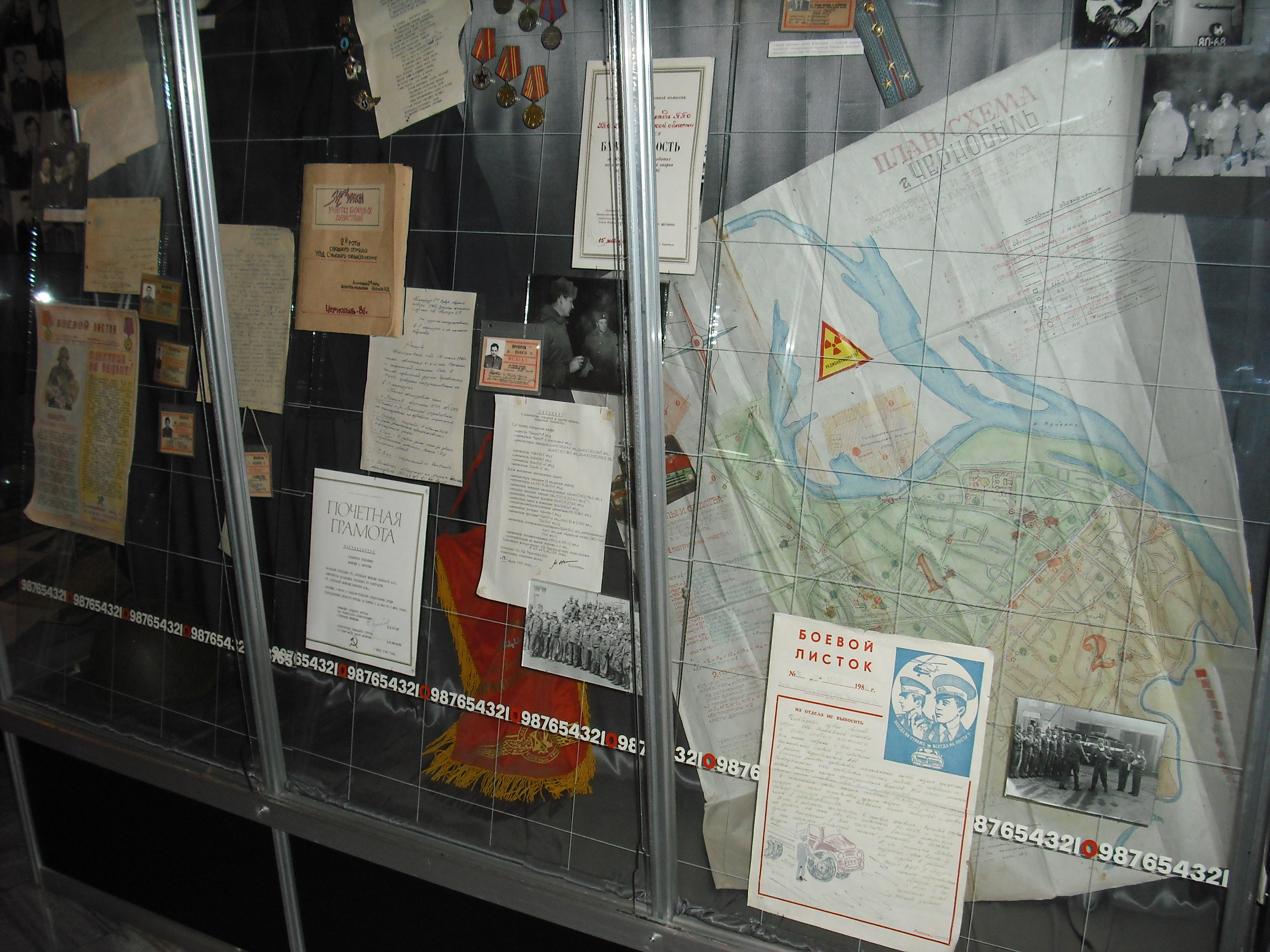

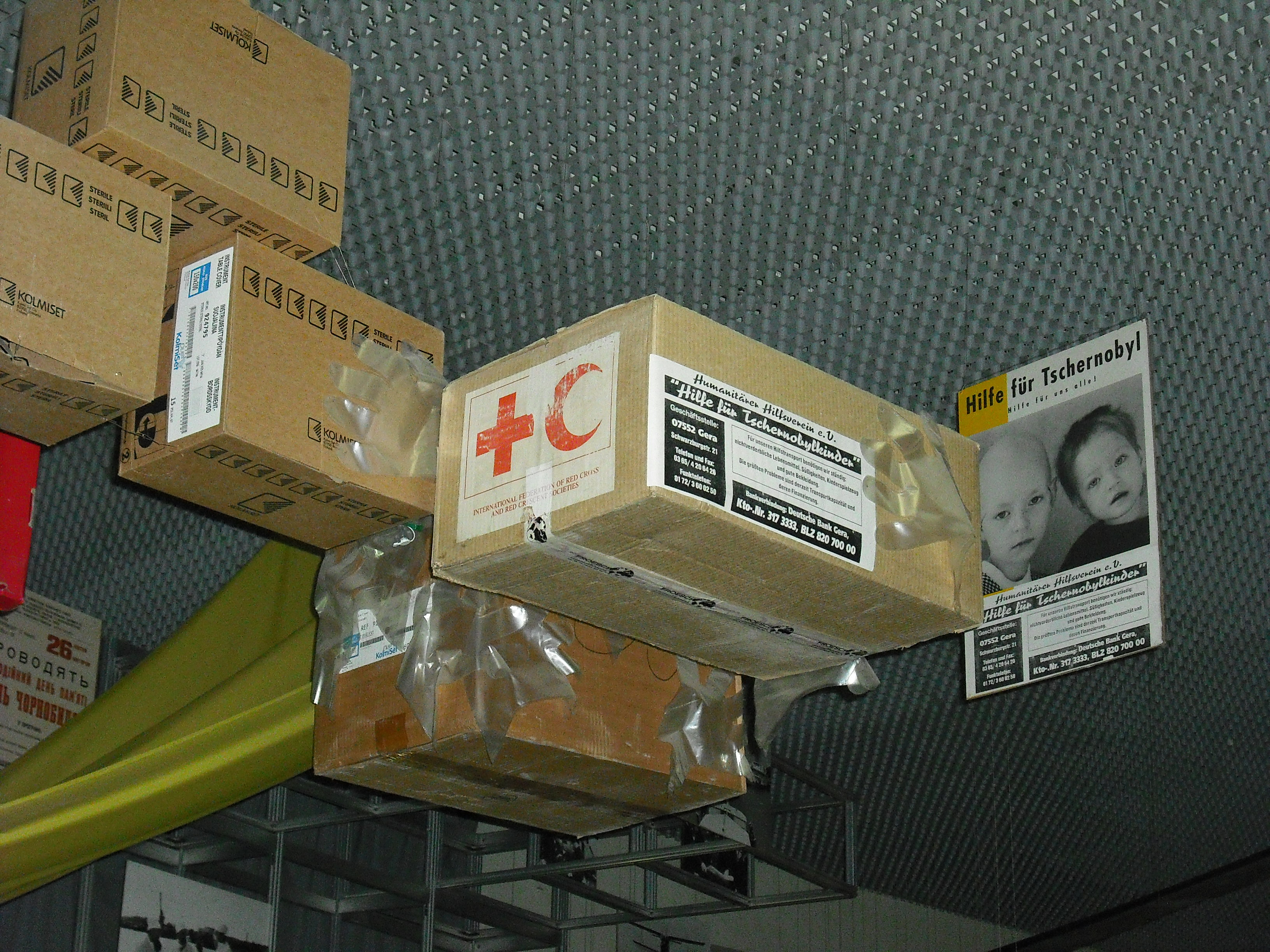

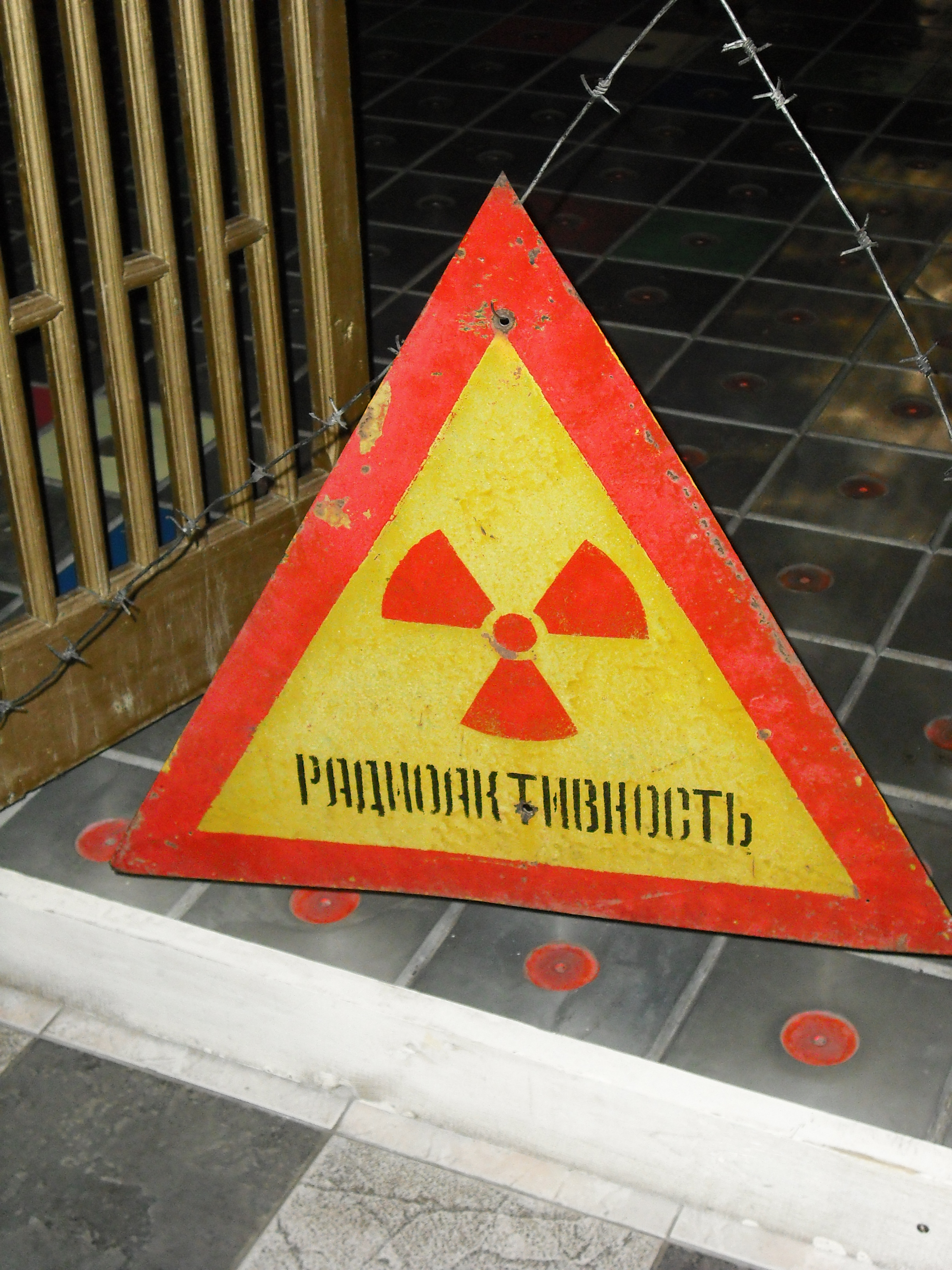

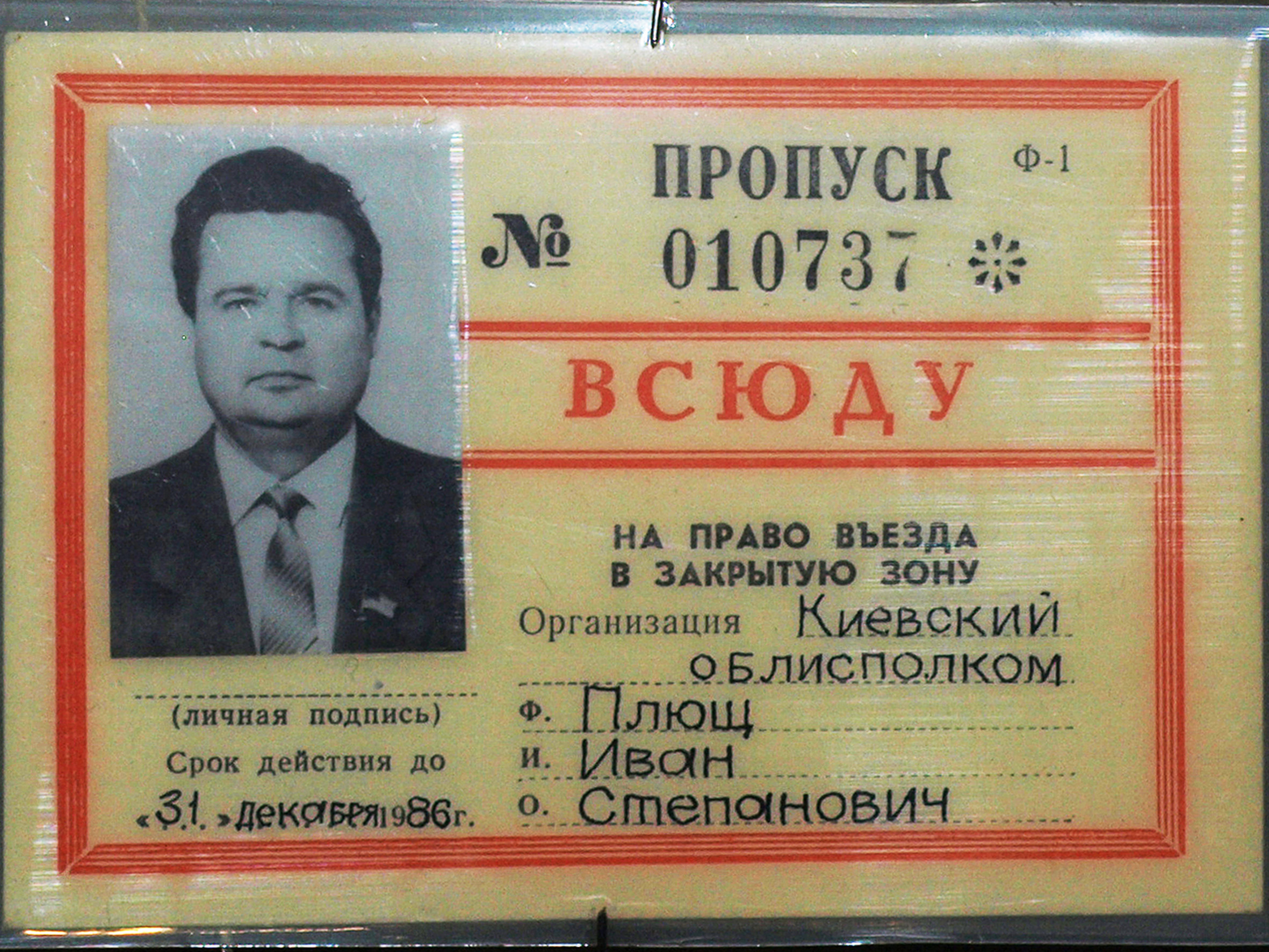

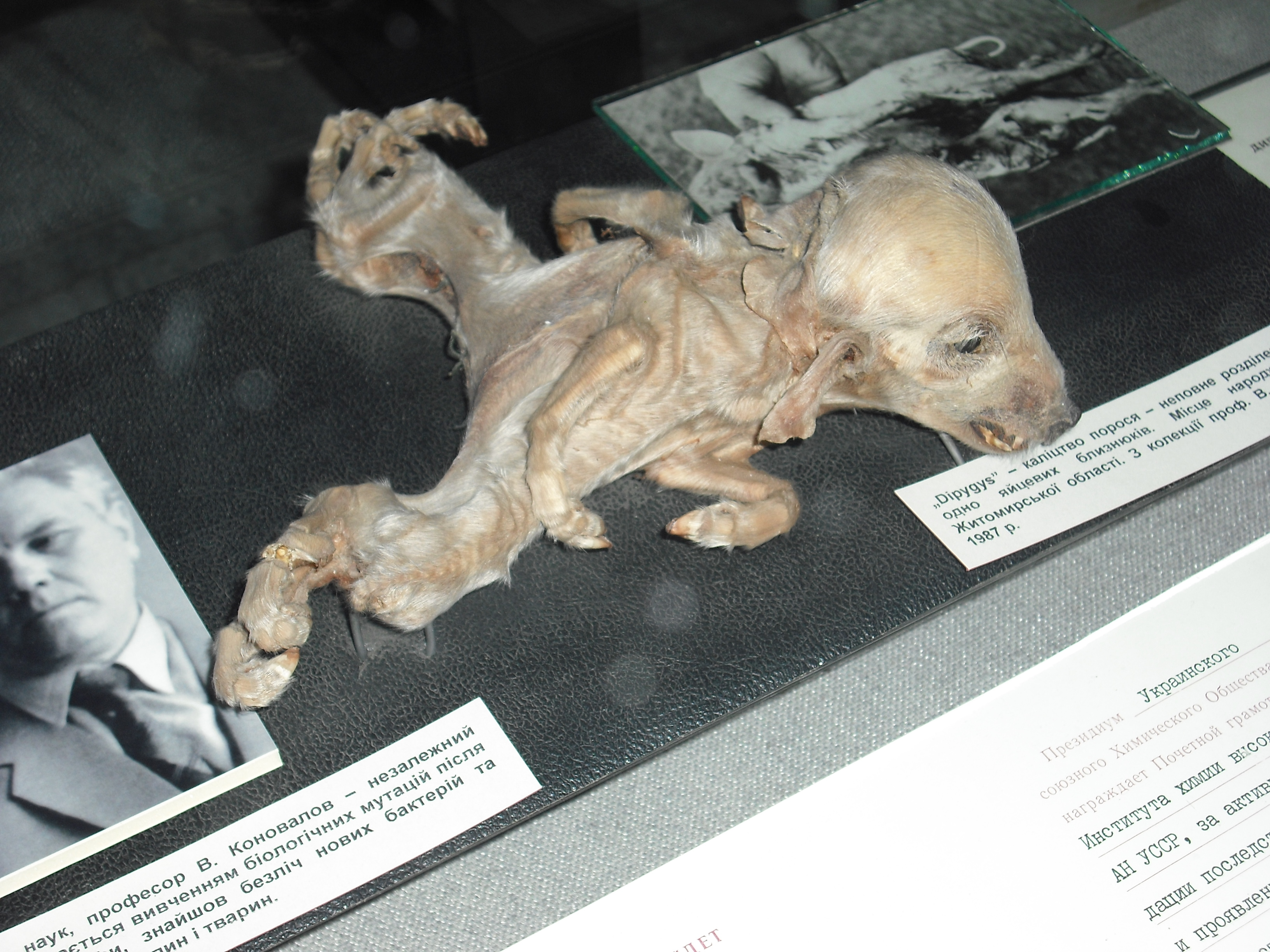

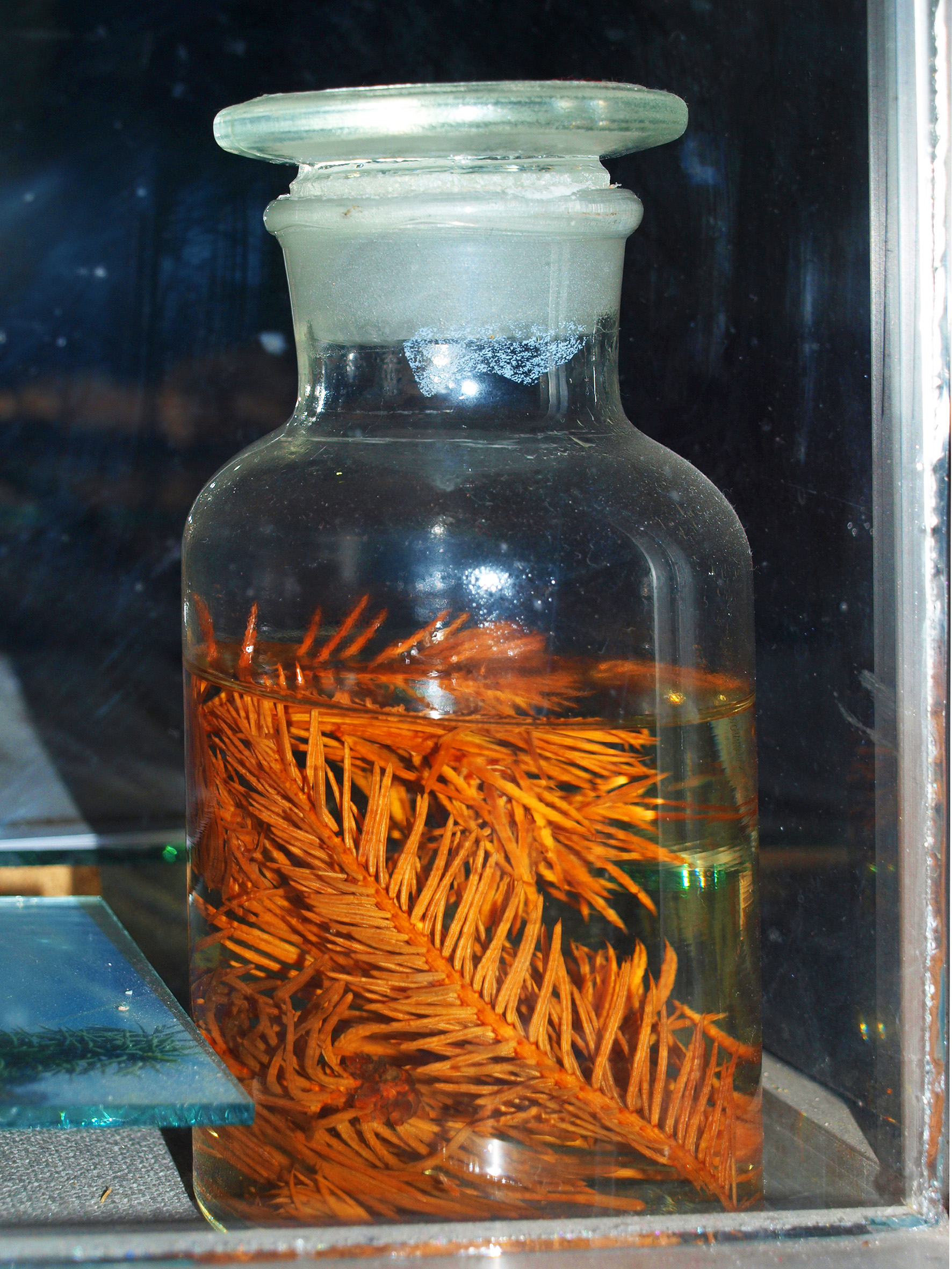

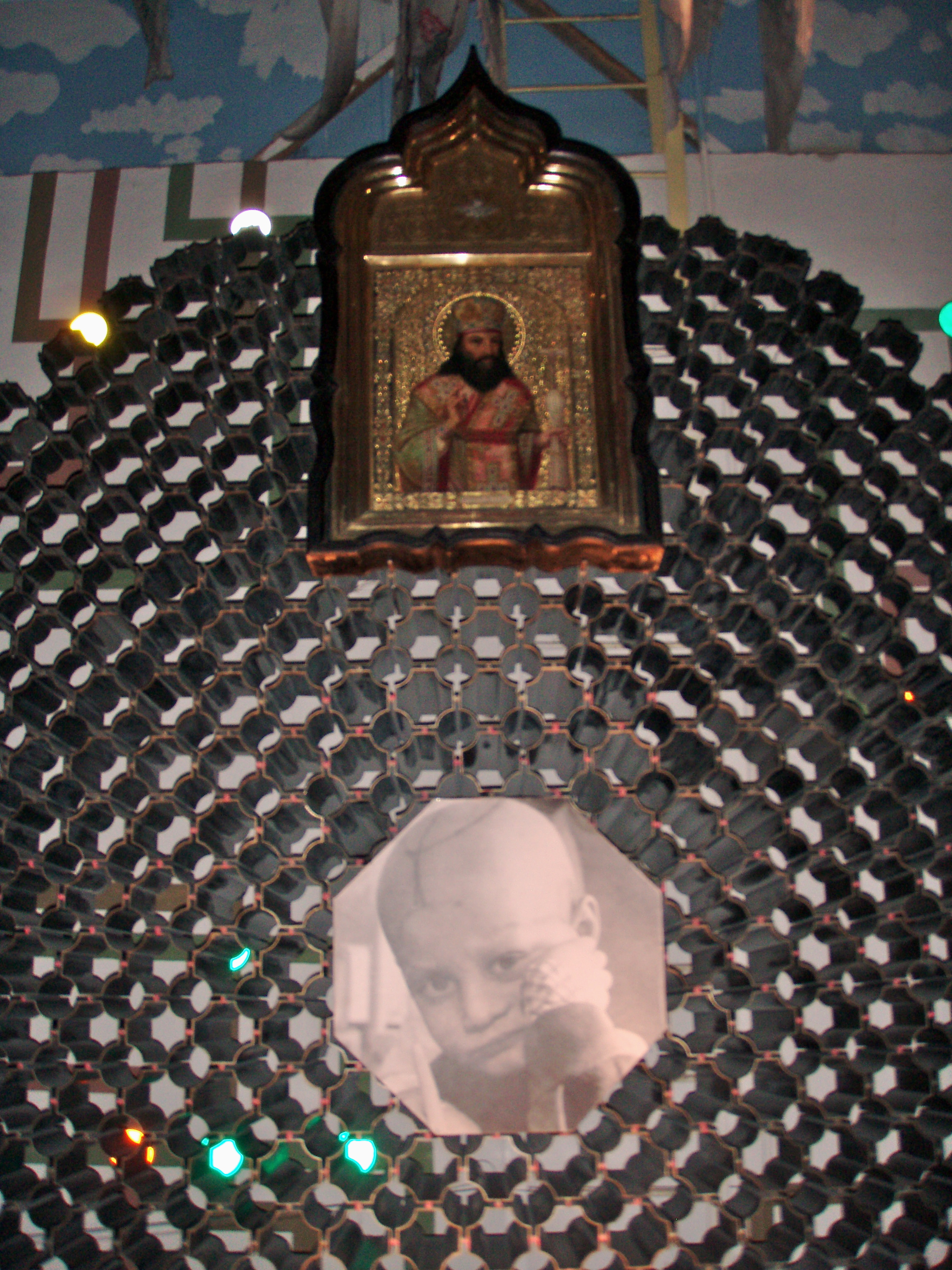

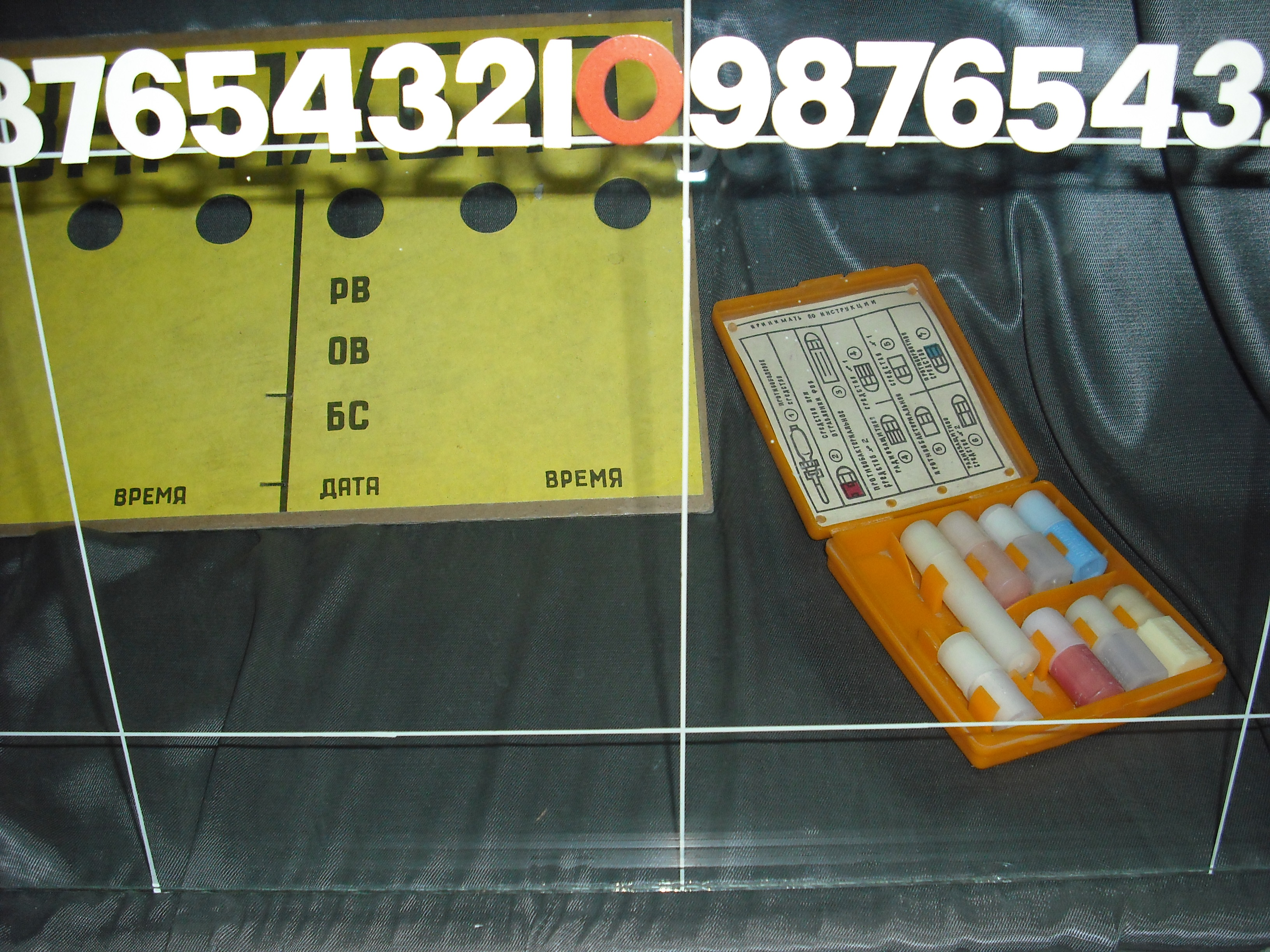

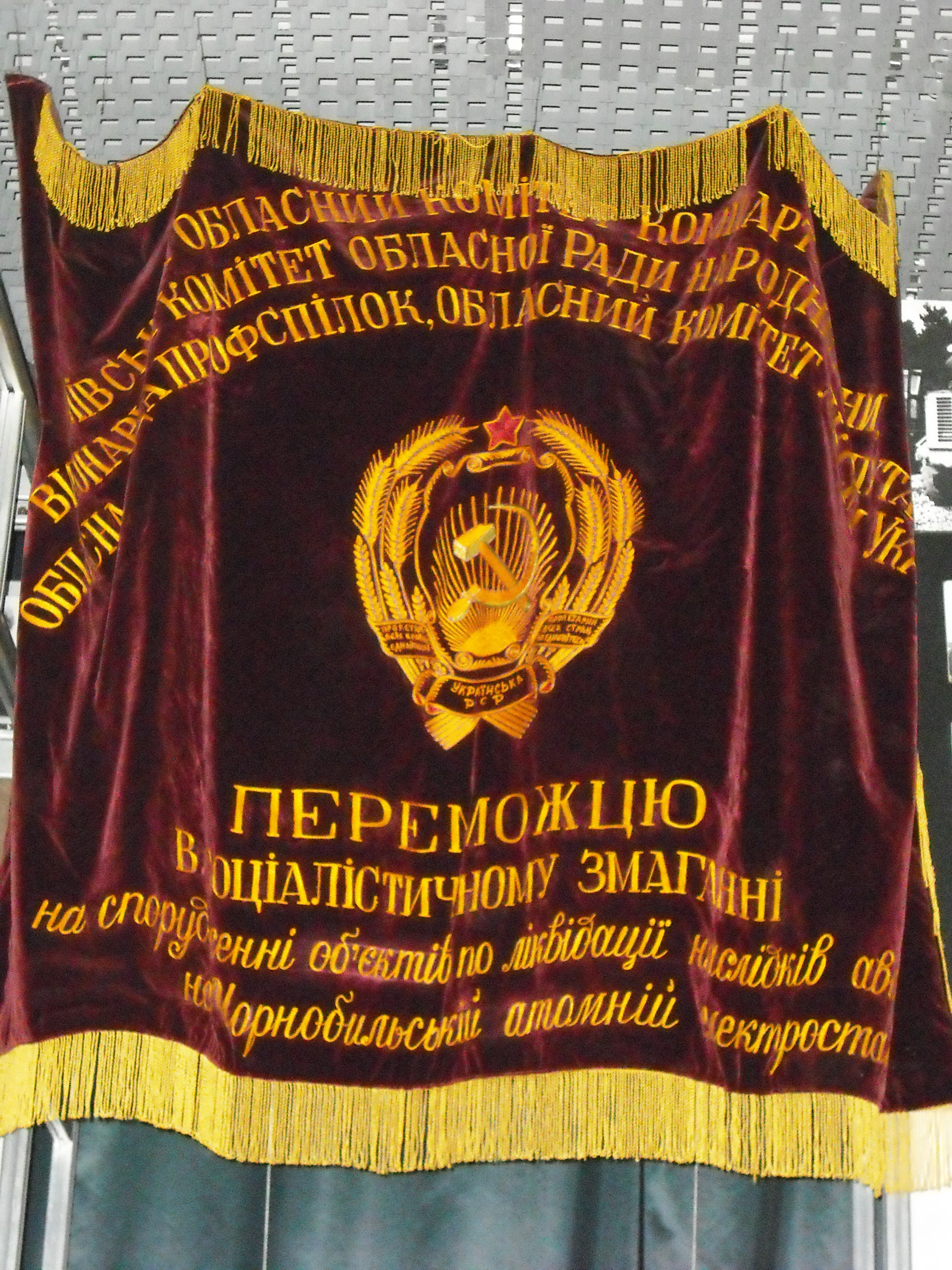

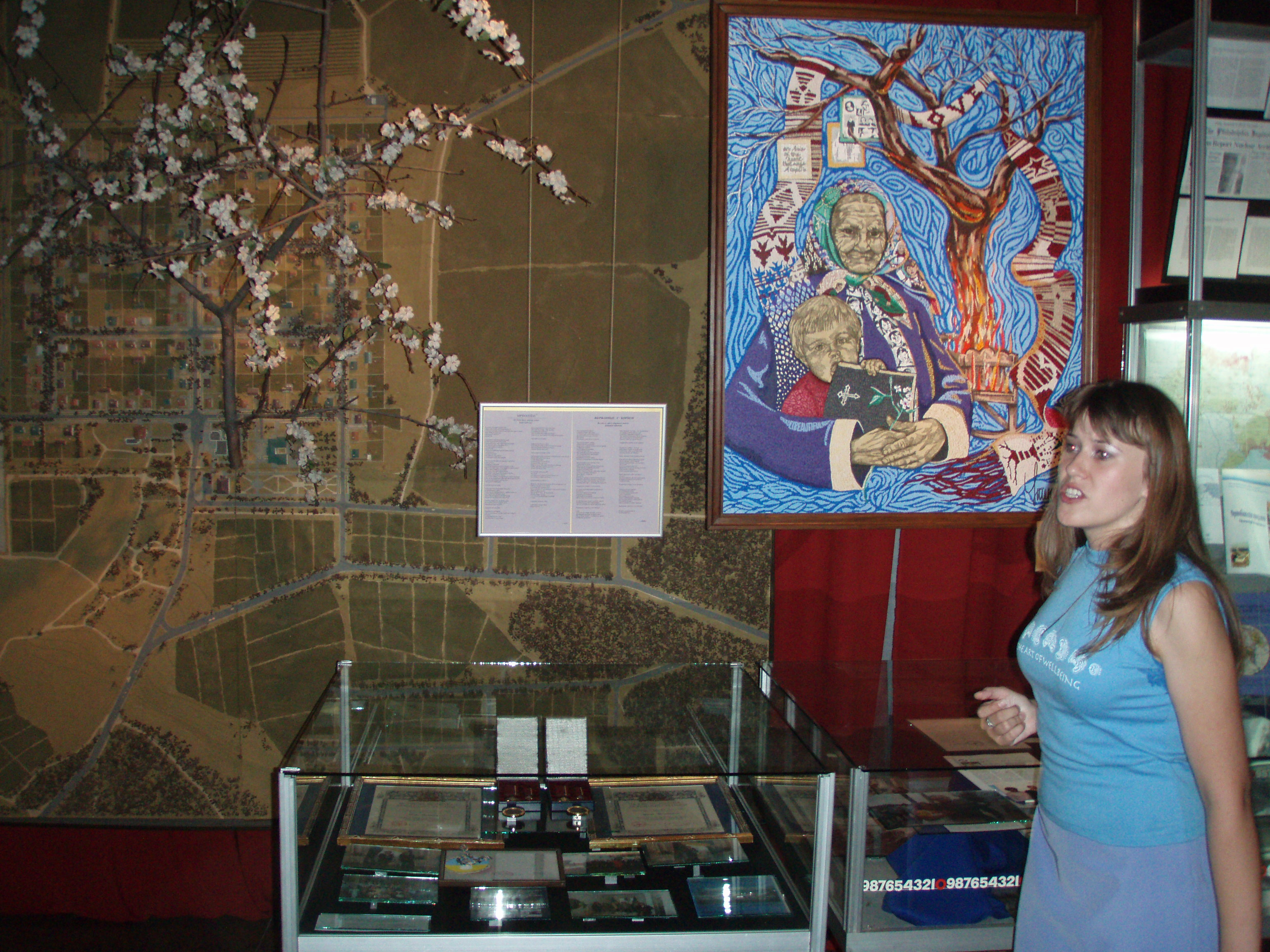

== See also ==
- Chernobyl Nuclear Power Plant
