= Chernobyl liquidators =

1986 Chernobyl disaster cleanup personnel

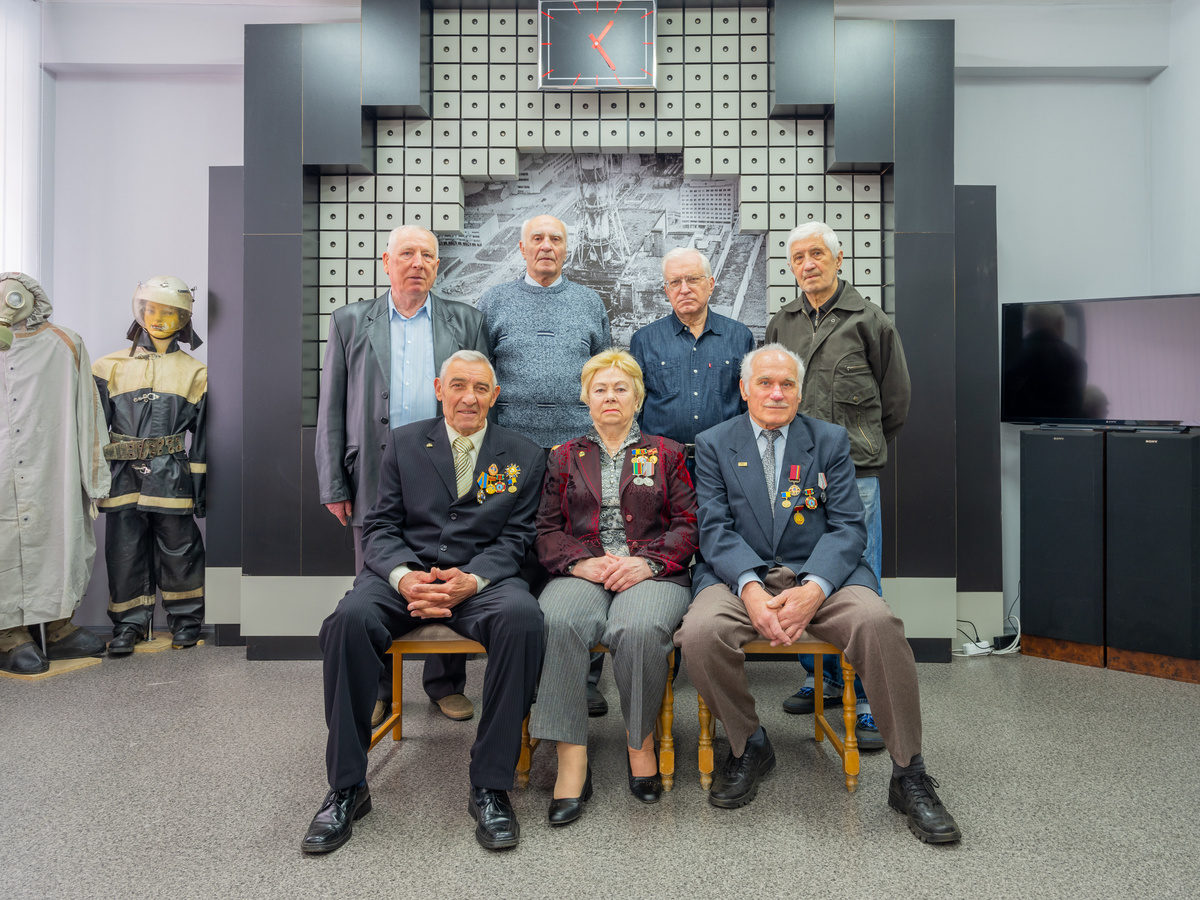
A group of liquidators gathered at the Museum of Slavutych on the 32nd anniversary of the Chernobyl disaster, 2018

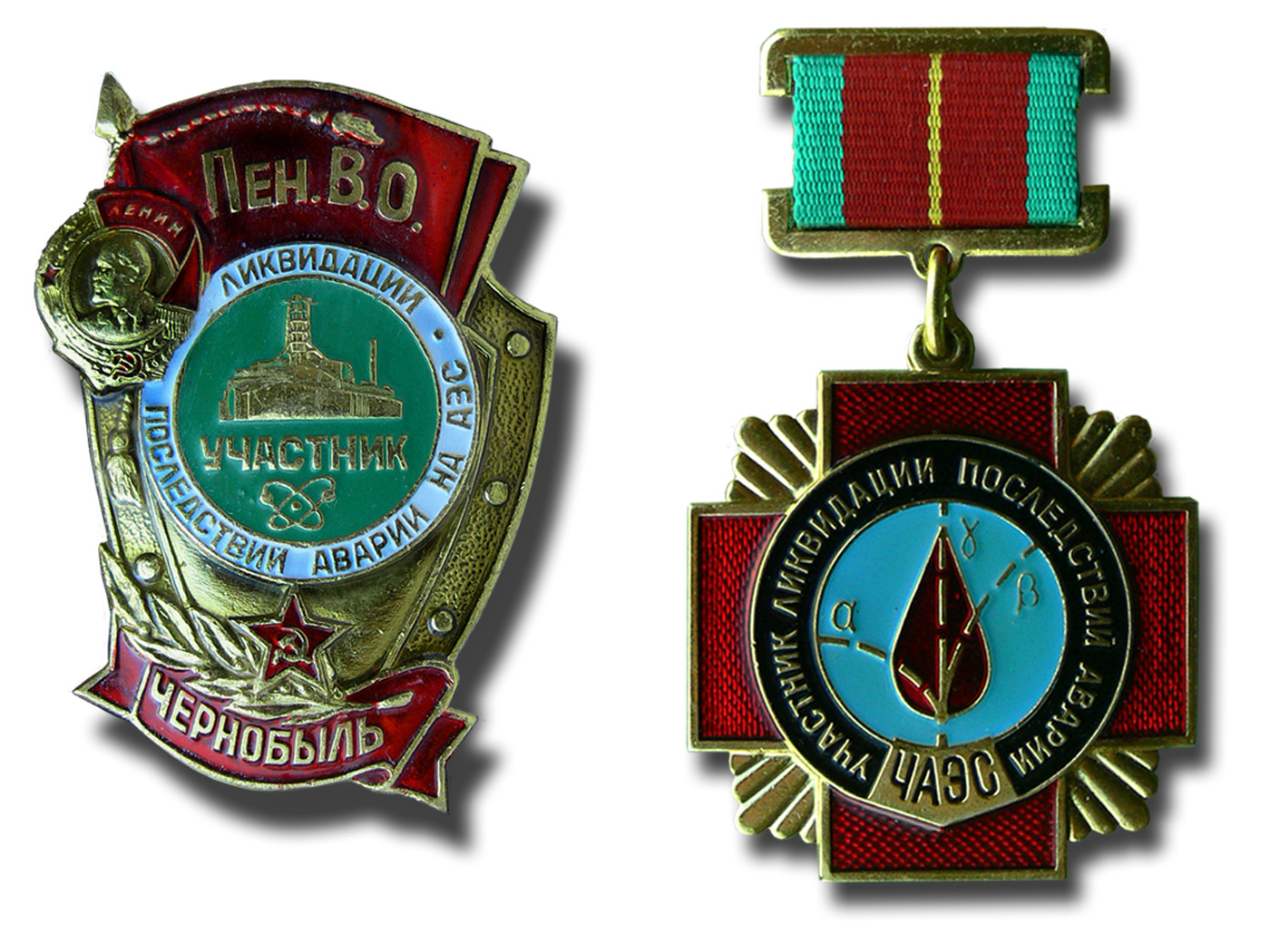
Soviet military badge (left) and medal awarded to liquidators.

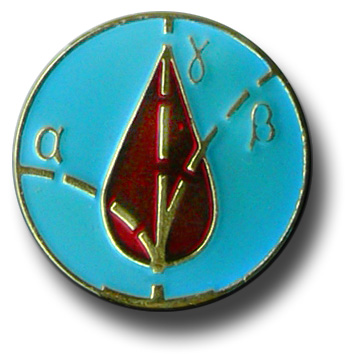
The central detail of the Liquidators' medal, with traces of alpha (α) and beta (β) particles and gamma (γ) rays over a drop of blood.

Chernobyl liquidators were the civil and military personnel who were called upon to deal with the consequences of the 1986 Chernobyl nuclear disaster in the Soviet Union on the site of the catastrophe and in affected areas. The liquidators are widely credited with limiting both the immediate and long-term damage from the disaster. On the overall recruitment and human scale, it remains one of the largest man-made environmental clean up operations in modern history.

Surviving liquidators are qualified for significant social benefits due to their veteran status in the former countries of the Soviet Union and abroad. Many liquidators were praised as heroes by the Soviet government and the press, while some struggled for years to have their participation, healthcare or stories officially recognized.

== Name ==
The euphemism "liquidator" (Ukrainian: ліквідатор, Belarusian: ліквідатар, Russian: ликвида́тор, likvidator) originates from the Soviet official definition "участник ликвидации последствий аварии на Чернобыльской АЭС" (uchastnik likvidatsii posledstviy avarii na Chernobylʹskoy AES, literally "participant in liquidation of the Chernobyl NPP accident consequences") which was widely used to describe the liquidators' activities regarding their employment, healthcare, and retirement. This exact phrase is engraved on the Soviet medals and badges awarded to the liquidators.

== Roles ==
Disaster management at Chernobyl included a diverse range of occupations, positions, and tasks, and in particular:

- Operational personnel of the Chernobyl nuclear power plant
- Firefighters who immediately responded to the reactor accident
- Civil defense troops of the Soviet Armed Forces who removed contaminated materials and the deactivation on the reactor and all affected territories
- Internal Troops and police who provided security, access control and population evacuation
- Military and civil medical and sanitation personnel, including:
  - Groups of female janitors tasked with the cleanup of food left inside abandoned homes to prevent outbreaks of infectious diseases
  - Special hunting squads assigned to exterminate domestic animals left in evacuated settlements
- Soviet Air Force and civil aviation units who fulfilled critical helicopter-assisted operations on the reactor building, air transportation and aerial radioactive contamination monitoring, including Mykola Melnyk, a civilian helicopter pilot who placed radiation sensors on the reactor
- Various civilian scientists, engineers, and workers involved in all stages of disaster management:
  - Transportation workers
  - A team of coal miners who built a large protective foundation to prevent radioactive material from entering the aquifer below the reactor
  - Construction professionals
- Media professionals who risked their lives to document the disaster on the ground, including photographers Igor Kostin and Volodymyr Shevchenko, who are credited with taking the most immediate and graphic pictures of the destroyed reactor, and liquidators conducting hazardous manual tasks

A small number of foreigners (mostly from the Western countries) volunteered to participate in international medicine- and science-related on-the-ground projects related to the relief operation. Technically, they may also qualify for liquidator status depending on their exact location and tasks at the time of participation.

== Health effects ==
According to the WHO, 240,000 recovery workers were called upon in 1986 and 1987 alone. Altogether, special certificates were issued for 600,000 people recognizing them as liquidators.

Total recorded doses to individual workers in Chernobyl recovery operations during the period through 1990 ranged from less than 10 millisieverts (less than 1 rem) to more than 1 sievert (100 rems), due primarily to external radiation. The average dose is estimated to have been 120 millisieverts (12 rem) and 85% of the recorded doses were between 20 and 500 millisieverts (2 to 50 rems). There are large uncertainties in these individual doses; estimates of the size of the uncertainty range from 50% to a factor of five and dose records for military personnel are thought to be biased toward high values. The United Nations Scientific Committee on the Effects of Atomic Radiation (UNSCEAR) estimates the total collective dose to the total of about 530,000 recovery operations workers as about 60,000 person-sieverts (6,000,000 person-rem).

In 2006, Vyacheslav Grishin of the Chernobyl Union, the main organization of liquidators, said "25,000 of the Russian liquidators are dead and 70,000 disabled, about the same in Ukraine, and 10,000 dead in Belarus and 25,000 disabled", which makes a total of 60,000 dead and 165,000 disabled (10% and 27,5% of the 600,000 liquidators). Estimates of the number of deaths potentially resulting from the disaster vary enormously: the World Health Organization (WHO) suggest it could reach 4,000 among highest exposed groups, with 9,000 in total for the millions exposed in the former Soviet states:

A total of up to 4,000 people could eventually die of radiation exposure from the Chernobyl nuclear power plant (NPP) accident nearly 20 years ago, an international team of more than 100 scientists has concluded. As of mid-2005, however, fewer than 50 deaths had been directly attributed to radiation from the disaster, almost all being highly exposed rescue workers, many who died within months of the accident but others who died as late as 2004.

Ivanov et al. (2001) studied nearly 66,000 liquidators from Russia, and found no increase in overall mortality from cancer or non-cancer causes. However, a statistically significant dose-related excess mortality risk was found for both cancer and heart disease.

Rahu et al. (2006) studied some 10,000 liquidators from Latvia and Estonia and found no significant increase in overall cancer rate. Among specific cancer types, statistically significant increases in both thyroid and brain cancer were found, although the authors believe these may have been the result of better cancer screening among liquidators (for thyroid cancer) or a random result (for brain cancer) because of the very low overall incidence.

While there is rough agreement that a total of either 31 or 54 people died from blast trauma or acute radiation syndrome (ARS) as a direct result of the disaster, there is considerable debate concerning the accurate number of deaths due to the disaster's long-term health effects, with estimates ranging from 4,000 to 9,000 (per the 2005 and 2006 conclusions of a joint consortium of the United Nations and the governments of Ukraine, Belarus, and Russia), to no fewer than 93,000 (per the conflicting conclusions of various scientific, health, environmental, and survivors' organizations).

== Legacy ==
The 20th anniversary of the Chernobyl catastrophe in 2006 was marked by a series of events and developments.

The liquidators held a rally in Kyiv to protest deteriorated compensation and medical support. Similar rallies were held in many other cities of the former Soviet Union.

More than 4,500 Estonian residents were sent to help in the liquidation. The liquidators who reside in Estonia (some 4,200 as reported in 2006, 3,140 as of 2011) campaigned in hope for the introduction of an Estonian law for their relief. Under Estonian law, the state was only obliged to provide help and relief only to citizens, who are "legal descendants" of the citizens of 1918–1940 Republic of Estonia. At the same time, Russia, Belarus and Ukraine do not provide any relief to the liquidators residing abroad. The problem is tied to the fact that Chernobyl veterans are classified under the Estonian Persons Repressed by Occupying Powers Act. It was reported in 2017 that an agreement had been reached by the Estonian parliament to provide all liquidators residing in Estonia, including over 1,400 non citizens, with a payment of €230 per year.

The most highly exposed clean-up workers were significantly more symptomatic on the somatization and posttraumatic stress disorder (PTSD) symptom scales. The workers with the greatest exposure reported more impairment than the two less-exposed groups, especially on the PTSD measures. Consistent with the findings of The Chernobyl Forum (2006) and with findings from other disasters involving radiation, the results show that the accident had a deleterious effect on mental health.

A number of military liquidators residing in Khabarovsk (Russia) were denied a certain compensation for loss of health on grounds that they were not salaried workers, but rather under military order. They had to appeal to the European Court of Human Rights. On 29 December 2004 and 21 March 2006, the Russian government adopted ECHR Rulings, according to which accommodation for Chernobyl victims and servicemen, including former servicemen, shall be granted either financial aid or state housing. However an interim ECHR Resolution in 2009 CM/ResDH(2009)43 indicated that the Russian government was failing to implement the policies.

== Heroes of Ukraine ==
About forty firefighters took part in extinguishing. After the explosion, a large amount of cesium-137 isotopes rose into the air together with the smoke, with an increase in the radiation background. All firefighters who participated in extinguishing received large doses of radiation. Many firefighters died of acute radiation syndrome and radiation burns in a fairly short period of time, but there were survivors. For their heroic actions and courage, they were presented with state awards of the Soviet Union, and some received the highest title of Heroes of the Soviet Union, among them Viktor Kibenok (posthumously), Volodymyr Pravyk (posthumously) and Leonid Telyatnikov, who survived and after treatment continued his service in the Soviet, and then in the Ukrainian fire brigade. In 1995, he retired with the rank of major general, and in 2004 he died of cancer in the city of Kyiv. In addition to firefighters, station employees took part in the extinguishing, they were engaged in turning off equipment, clearing debris, extinguishing fires on equipment and other work, as well as police officers who helped with the organization of the initial and subsequent liquidation, and doctors who were the first to treat the injured from the explosion and radiation.

The actions of the liquidators were noted in Ukraine at the state level. Many of them were posthumously awarded state honors of Ukraine, in particular the highest - Hero of Ukraine with the award of the "Golden Star" order. In 2006, Mykola Vashchuk, Vasily Ignatenko, Tytenko Mykola, Volodymyr Tyshur, Volodymyr Pravyk and station worker Oleksandr Lelechenko were posthumously awarded this title. On June 24, 2019, the title of Hero of Ukraine with the awarding of the "Golden Star" order was awarded to: Ananenka Oleksiy, Bespalova Valery and Boris Baranov (posthumously). They were three volunteers who, a few days after the explosion, descended into the bubble pool and emptied it. This was done so that the spewed nuclear material of the destroyed reactor did not reach the water. In this way, the three engineers prevented a steam explosion, thereby saving the world from an even greater disaster.

In many cities of Ukraine, monuments have been erected, memorials and plaques have been opened to heroes, and various objects have been named after them. In the memorial complex of victims of the Chernobyl disaster in Kyiv, busts of Chernobyl firefighters Heroes of Ukraine have been installed. Oleksandr Lelechenko's name is engraved on one of the Commemorative plaque to the Heroes of Chernobyl in Kyiv at the intersection of Verkhovna Rada Boulevard and Myru Avenue.

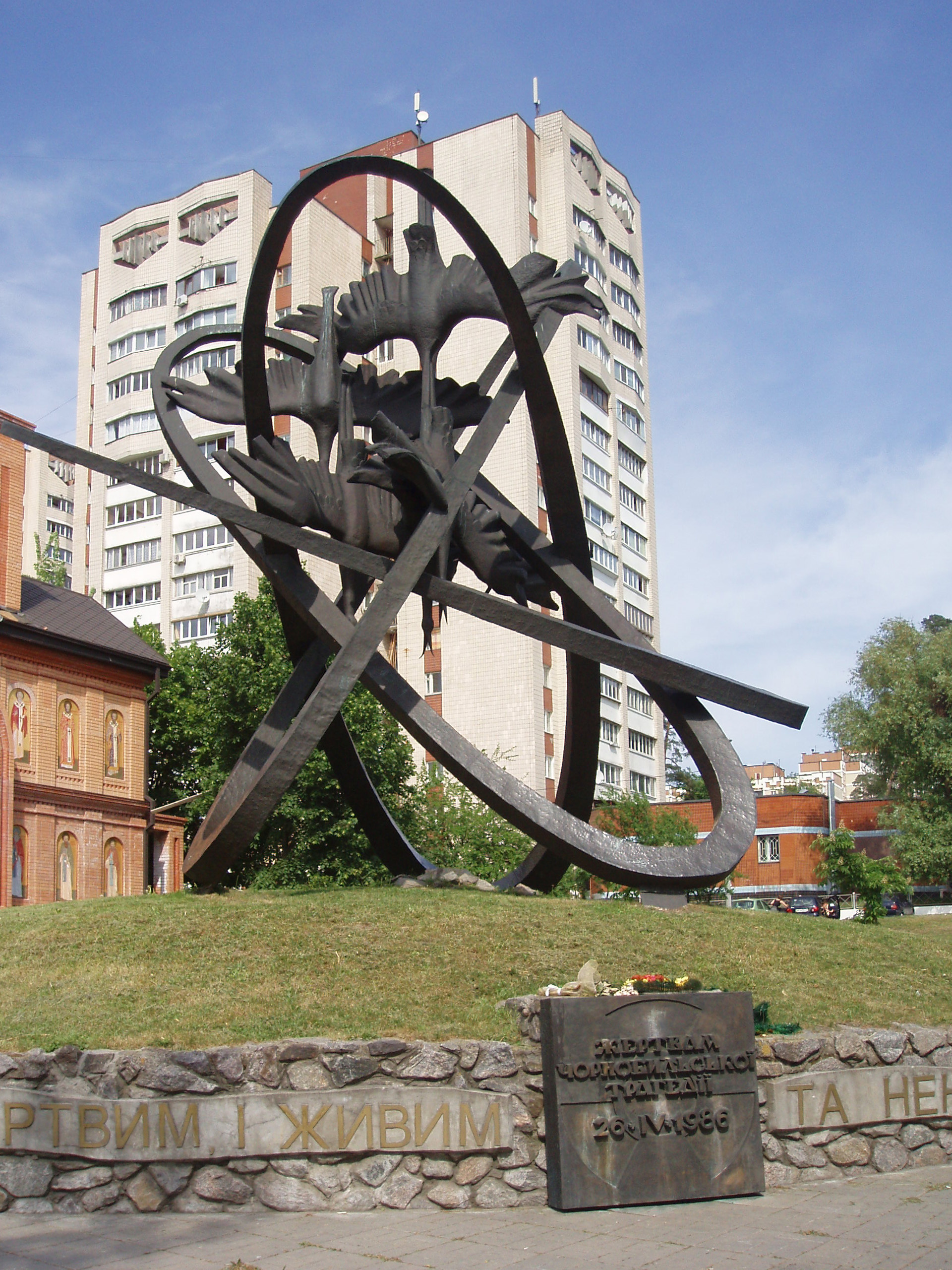
Monument to the victims of the Chernobyl disaster, Kyiv, built in 1994

== Public record ==
The National Chernobyl Museum in Kyiv, Ukraine, keeps a "Remembrance Book" (Ukrainian: Книга пам'яті, Knyha Pamyati) – an open to the public online database of liquidators featuring personal pages with photo and brief structured information on their input. Data fields include "Radiation damage suffered", "Field of liquidation activity" and "Subsequent fate". The project started in 1997, containing over 5,000 entries as of February, 2013. The database is currently available in the Ukrainian language only.

Despite the existence and efforts of the “Remembrance Book” in the National Chernobyl Museum bringing the actions of the liquidators public, much information regarding the surviving liquidators are hidden and ignored by the state. One such information includes how the Soviet authorities often downplayed and concealed the dangers that many of these liquidators had to face. Many were forced to sign fake documents that downplayed the amount of radiation they were actually exposed to. This in turn put them in a position where they would not be able to access proper compensation for their services or receive basic medical care resulting from being exposed to large amounts of radiation. Furthermore, even in the case where the health of the liquidators was declining so fast that it could no longer be ignored, the Soviet government officials would frame it as a health problem not related to radiation but a result of personal lifestyle choices such as alcoholism or heart diseases thus putting the blame on the liquidators themselves. The state had full power to decide whether to report the actual amount of radiation the liquidators were absorbing but instead chose to keep it all hidden. This was achieved by forcing the surviving liquidators to underreport the actual amount of radiation they were exposed to. This lack of recognition and forced manipulation further added to the suffering of the liquidators, thus leaving them marginalized and excluded from state support. Thus while the actual Chernobyl incident is known publicly, the information on the victims of the disaster and their treatment by their own government does not cover all bases and leaves a lot to be desired.

== See also ==
- Chernobyl: Abyss, a 2021 Russian film about a fictionalized liquidator
- Fukushima 50, a similar group of workers from the 2011 nuclear disaster in Japan
- Hibakusha, Japanese terms for a person who has been irradiated by a nuclear bomb
- Nuclear labor issues
- List of Chernobyl-related articles
