= Oleksiy Ananenko =

Ukrainian engineer at Chernobyl

Hero of Ukraine Oleksiy Ananenko OGS
- Олексій Ананенко
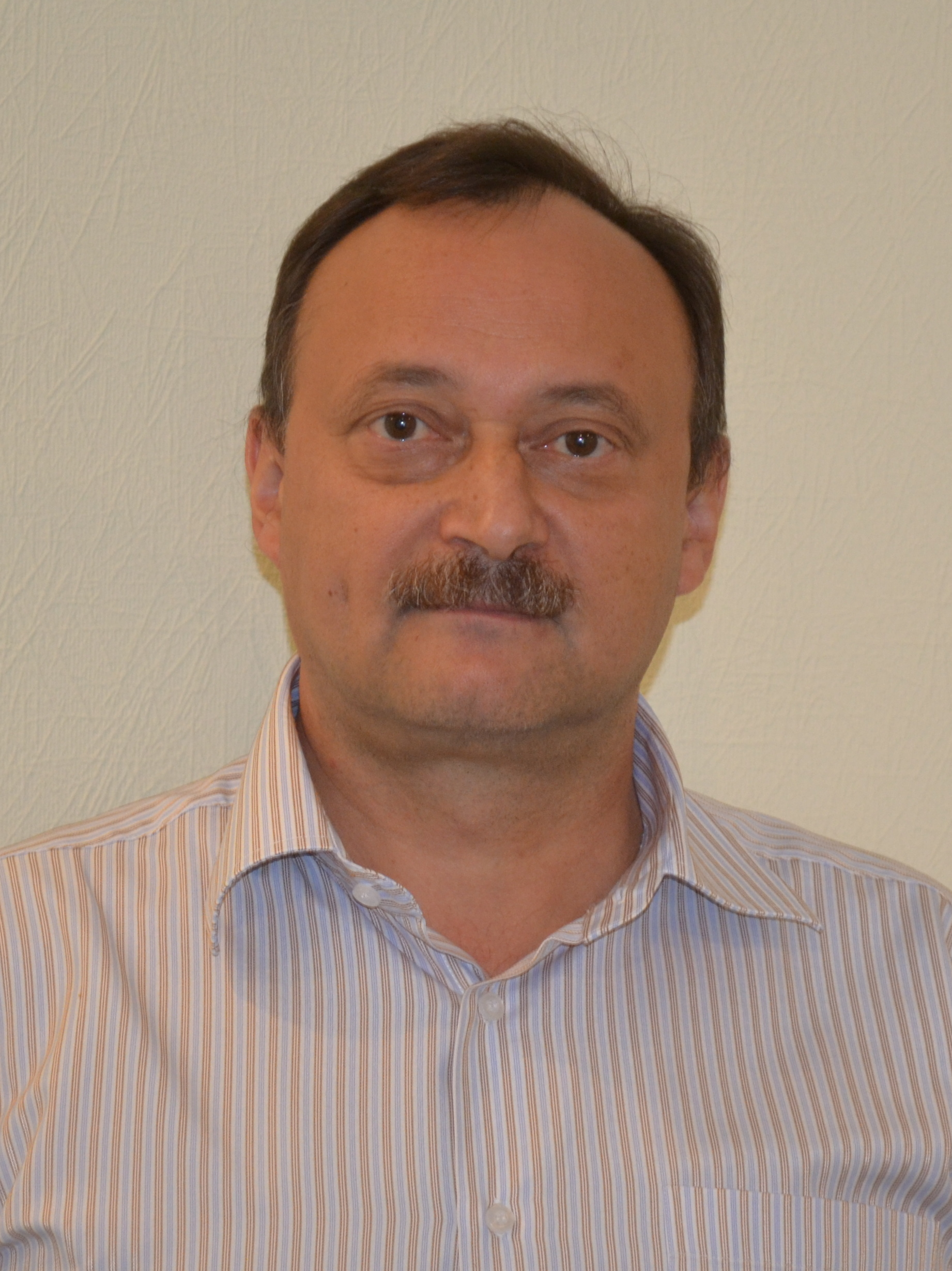
- Ananenko in 2011
- Born: 13 October 1959 (age 66); Inta, Komi ASSR, USSR
- Known for: one of Chernobyl liquidators
- Awards: Hero of Ukraine

Oleksiy Mykhailovych Ananenko (Ukrainian: Олексій Михайлович Ананенко; born 13 October 1959) is a Ukrainian mechanical engineer who worked at the Chernobyl Nuclear Power Plant.

== Biography ==
After the Chernobyl disaster, he was part of the three-man "suicide squad" that drained the steam suppression pools under the fourth reactor building, since he was very familiar with the layout of the building. Although his feat was quickly forgotten in the wake of the disaster, he was awarded the Order for Courage in 2018 and the title Hero of Ukraine in 2019.

Despite media reports claiming the three men died of radiation poisoning shortly after the incident, he was still alive after. However, as of 15th November 2025 there was a Russian drone (Shahed) attack on Kyiv's Troieshchyna district and it was reported that it hit a specific apartment block where Ananenko lived, but no report of him being killed or injured. Also within the same apartment block, lived the Widow of Valery Khodemchuk, who died as a result of the attack

== In media ==
Ananenko was portrayed by Baltasar Breki Samper in the Sky/HBO miniseries Chernobyl (2019).

The 2020 game Liquidators puts players into the perspective of Ananenko as he, Bespalov, and Baranov work to drain the steam suppression pools under Reactor 4.

== See also ==
- Valery Bespalov
- Boris Baranov
