= Boris Baranov =

Engineer at the Chernobyl Nuclear Plant

- Борис Баранов
- Born: 11 November 1940; Sozinovy, Kirov Oblast, Russian SFSR, Soviet Union
- Died: 6 April 2005 (aged 64); Kyiv, Ukraine
- Burial place: Lisove Cemetery, Kyiv, Ukraine
- Education: Ukrainian Engineering Pedagogics Academy
- Children: 2
- Awards: Hero of Ukraine

Boris Aleksandrovich Baranov (Russian: Борис Александрович Баранов; Ukrainian: Борис Олександрович Баранов, romanized: Borys Oleksandrovych Baranov; 11 November 1940 — 6 April 2005) was an engineer at the Chernobyl Nuclear Power Plant and a Chernobyl liquidator. As a liquidator, he and two others volunteered to drain the steam suppression pools under the fourth reactor building, thus preventing the reactor from exploding.

Baranov lived almost 20 years after the Chernobyl disaster, dying due to a heart attack in Kyiv, Ukraine, on 6 April 2005, aged 64. In 2019, he was posthumously awarded the title Hero of Ukraine.

== Career ==
Boris Aleksandrovich Baranov was born on November 11, 1940, in Sozinovy, Kirov Oblast, Russian SFSR, Soviet Union. Baranov had a brother five years older than him named Viktor. Their father died during World War II.

After completing his military service in the Soviet Army, Baranov moved to the Ukrainian Soviet Socialist Republic. There, he worked from 1966 to 1976 as an engineer at the Kryvyi Rih Metallurgical Plant in Kryvyi Rih, Dnipropetrovsk Oblast. Baranov later became a shift supervisor at the plant. At the same time, Baranov graduated from the Ukrainian Engineering Pedagogics Academy in Kharkiv in 1974 with a degree in heat and power engineering. In 1976, he began working at the Chernobyl Nuclear Power Plant in Kyiv Oblast as a shift supervisor.

Also in 1976, Baranov's wife died and he was left to raise his six-year-old daughter and one-year-old son alone.

== Chernobyl disaster ==
Reactor 4 of the Chernobyl Nuclear Power Plant in the Ukraine SSR exploded on 26 April 1986 at 1:23 a.m, resulting in a release of large amounts of radiation across a large area. When the fire was put out, officials began worrying about the corium, a radioactive lava-like material, melting into the bubbler pools below and creating a steam explosion that would eject more radioactive material into the area. However, this fear was unfounded since corium had already began dripping into the bubbler pools, turning into a ceramic pumice that floated on the water's surface. Government officials were unaware of this, and thus decided to drain the bubbler pools by opening its sluice gates. The sluice gates were controlled by valves located in a flooded subterranean annex adjacent to the Reactor 4 building. The path to them had been made passable, with water up at knee-level in some parts, by the efforts of firefighters who had used specialized water hoses.

The team responsible for carrying this out was composed of Oleksiy Ananenko and Valeri Bezpalov (engineers who had knowledge of where the valves were), and Boris Baranov. Unofficially called the 'suicide squad', all three men were volunteers. Equipped in diving suits with respirators for their protection from radioactive aerosols, and also carrying dosimeters, the men entered into the flooded area on May 7. Using their searchlights, they followed pipes to the valve and opened the sluice gates. 20,000 tonnes (20,000 long tons; 22,000 short tons) of water was then pumped out using fire brigade pumps until it was gone by May 8.

== In media ==
Baranov was portrayed by Oscar Giese in the Sky/HBO miniseries Chernobyl (2019).

The 2020 game Liquidators puts players into the perspective of Baranov as he, Ananenko, and Bespalov work to drain the steam suppression pools under Reactor 4.

== See also ==
- Oleksiy Ananenko
- Valery Bespalov
