= Valery Bespalov =

Ukrainian engineer at Chornobyl Power Plant

Hero of Ukraine Valery Bespalov OGS
- Валерий Беспалов
- Born: 21 September 1957 (age 68); Lisivka, Donetsk Oblast, USSR
- Citizenship: USSR → Ukraine
- Known for: one of Chernobyl liquidators
- Awards: Hero of Ukraine

Valery Alekseyevich Bespalov (Russian: Валерий Алексеевич Беспалов; Ukrainian: Валерій Олексійович Беспалов, romanized: Valerii Oleksiiovych Bespalov; born 21 September 1957) is an engineer who worked at the Chernobyl Nuclear Power Plant. After the Chernobyl disaster, he was one of the three men in the "suicide squad" team to drain the steam suppression pools under the fourth reactor building. In 2019 he was awarded the title Hero of Ukraine.

Despite media reports claiming the three men died of radiation poisoning shortly after the incident, he remains alive in Kyiv as of 2019.

== In media ==
Bespalov was portrayed by Philip Barantini in the Sky/HBO miniseries Chernobyl (2019).

The 2020 game Liquidators puts players into the perspective of Bespalov as he, Ananenko, and Baranov work to drain the steam suppression pools under Reactor 4.

== See also ==
- Oleksiy Ananenko
- Boris Baranov
