= Helicopter Association International =

Not-for-profit professional trade association

Vertical Aviation International
- Founded: 1948
- Type: Trade Association
- Purpose: Dedicated to the Advancement of Vertical Aviation
- Location: Alexandria, Virginia. U.S.
- Website: verticalavi.org

The Vertical Aviation International (VAI) is a not-for-profit professional trade association of over 2,500 member organizations in more than 68 nations. In 2024, Helicopter Association International (HAI) rebranded into Vertical Aviation International.

Since 1948, VAI has provided its membership with services that directly benefit their operations and advances the civil helicopter industry by providing programs that enhance safety, encourage professionalism and promote the unique contributions made by helicopters to society, according to its mission statement. Their Salute to Excellence awards are issued annually "for outstanding achievements in the international helicopter community".

Every year the VAI arranges the helicopter exhibition VERTICON. In 2024 25,000 visitors explored the booths of 730+ exhibitors.
