= Economy of Turkmenistan =

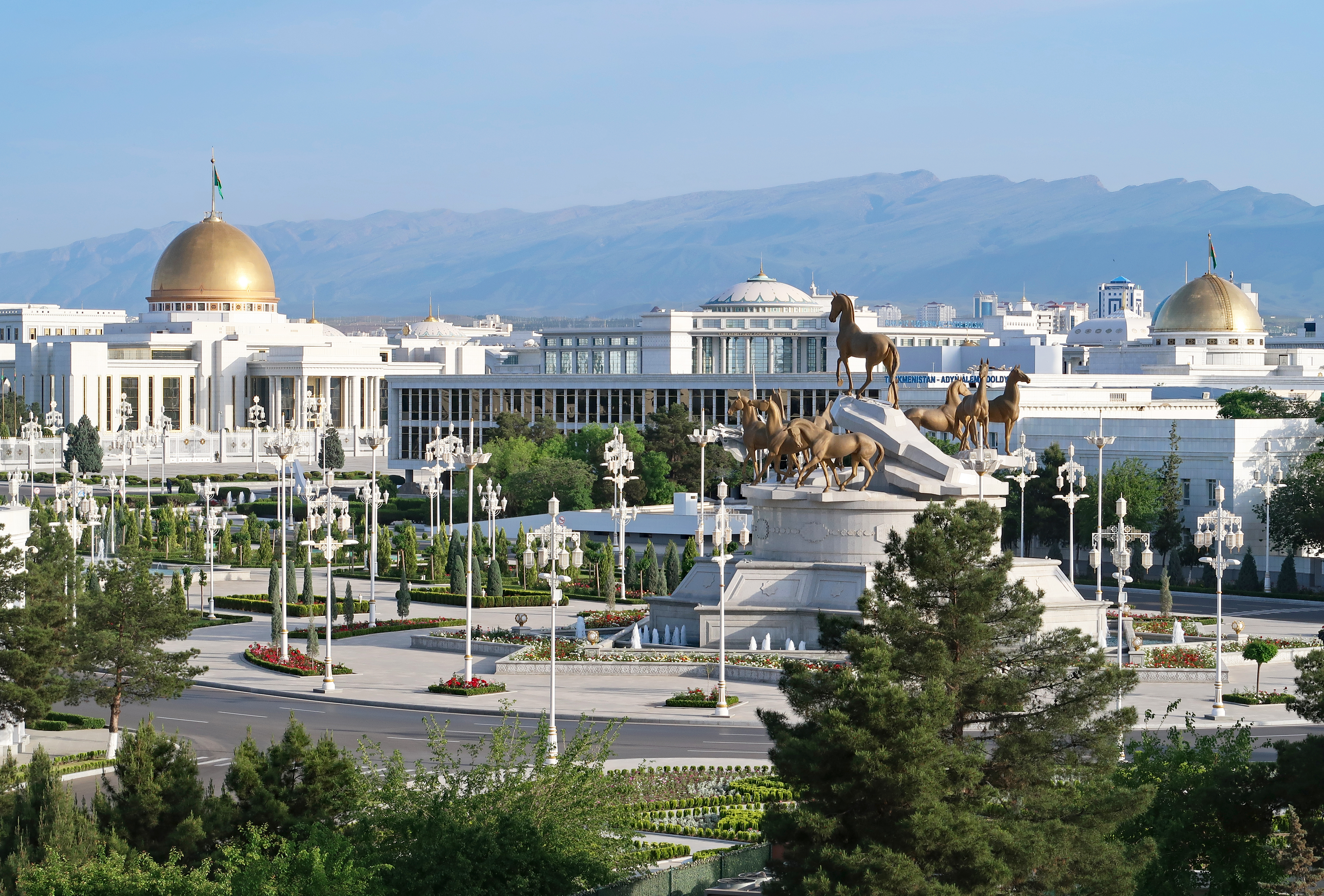
- Ashgabat is the economic centre of Turkmenistan
- Currency: Turkmen manat (TMT, ₼)
- Fiscal year: Calendar year
- Trade organisations: CIS, ECO

Statistics
- GDP: ▲$83.06 billion (nominal, 2026); ▲$164.43 billion (PPP, 2026)
- GDP rank: 85th (nominal, 2026); 88th (PPP, 2026)
- GDP growth: ▲3.6% (2025); ▲2.6% (2026); ▲2.0% (2027f)
- GDP per capita: ▲$12,300 (nominal, 2026f); ▲$24,349 (PPP, 2026 est.)
- GDP by sector: agriculture (12.7%), industry (50.1%), services (37.7%) (2018 est.)
- Inflation (CPI): 3.9% (2026)
- Population below national poverty line: 0.2% (2018)
- Human Development Index: ▲0.764 high (2023) (95th); ▲0.619 mediumIHDI (2021)
- Labour force: 2.405 million (2018 est.)
- Labour force by occupation: agriculture (44.2%), industry (15%), services (40.8%) (2018 est.)
- Unemployment: 15% (2020)
- Main industries: natural gas, oil, petroleum products, textiles, food processing

External
- Exports: ▼US$7.2 billion (2019)
- Export goods: gas, crude oil, petrochemicals, textiles, cotton fiber
- Main export partners: China 66.5%; Turkey 9.23%; Uzbekistan 8.76%; Georgia 2.85; Russia 1.86%; Brazil 1.37%; Iran 1.18%; Greece 1.17%; Ukraine 1.14%; Italy 0.99% (2021)
- Imports: ▼US$3.47 billion (2021)
- Import goods: machinery and equipment, chemicals, foodstuffs
- Main import partners: Turkey 28.2%; China 14.8%; Russia 13.6%; United Arab Emirates 7.13%; Germany 6.18%; Italy 5.13%; Iran 3.23%; Uzbekistan 2.75%; USA 2.27%; Brazil 1.77% (2021)
- Gross external debt: ▲US$5 billion (2021)

Public finance
- Foreign reserves: ▲US$40.06 billion (2018)
- Revenue: US$9.047 billion (2019)
- Spending: US$10.659 billion (2019)
- Economic aid: US$4.3 million from the United States (As of 2021)
- All values, unless otherwise stated, are in US dollars.

The economy of Turkmenistan is heavily dependent on natural gas, petroleum, and cotton. Since independence in 1991, Turkmenistan has retained many features of the Soviet centrally planned system, with the state continuing to play a dominant role in economic activity through central planning, extensive state ownership, and regulation, thereby limiting private-sector development, foreign investment, and economic diversification. Although limited economic reforms have been introduced, the economy remains strongly influenced by government policy and hydrocarbon exports.

Turkmenistan has some of the world's largest natural gas reserves and is among the leading producers of cotton. Natural gas is the country's principal export commodity, while petroleum, petrochemicals, electricity generation, textiles, and irrigated agriculture also make significant contributions to the economy. Wheat is grown primarily for domestic consumption, whereas cotton is largely produced for export.

Economic performance has been strongly affected by fluctuations in hydrocarbon prices and shifts in export markets. China has become the principal destination for Turkmen natural gas exports, replacing Russia, while the government has sought to diversify export routes and develop domestic petrochemical industries.

== History ==
From 1998 to 2005, Turkmenistan suffered from a lack of adequate export routes for natural gas and from obligations on extensive short-term external debt. At the same time, however, total exports rose by an average of roughly 15% per year from 2003 to 2008, largely because of higher international oil and gas prices. As in the Soviet era, central planning and state control is prominent in the system, and the Niyazov government (in power 1991–2006) consistently rejected market reform programs. The state subsidized a wide variety of commodities and services from the early 1990s to 2019. Following his election in 2007, President Gurbanguly Berdimuhamedow unified the country's dual currency exchange rate, ordered the redenomination of the manat, reduced state subsidies for gasoline, and initiated development of a special tourism zone (Awaza) on the Caspian Sea.

Since 2009, Turkmenistan has maintained a fixed exchange rate. In that year, the rate was set at US$1 to 2.85 manats. On 1 January 2015, the official exchange rate was changed to US$1 to 3.50 manats. However, the black-market exchange rate as of February 2021 was fluctuating around 29 to 30 manats to the dollar. As of mid-April, the black-market manat-dollar exchange rate had slid to 40 manat to the dollar.

Former President Gurbanguly Berdimuhamedow at a session of the Cabinet of Ministers on 11 March 2021, called the rate of GDP growth unsatisfactory. When discussing the 2021 government budget, he noted that 2021 would be "as difficult" a year as 2020 had been.

== Fiscal policy ==
The government budget is developed and implemented in accord with the Law “On Budget System”. The law fixes the legal foundations of organizing management and operating the budget system, and regulates interrelations between budgets at all levels. The government of Turkmenistan discusses the state budget draft and submits it to the President of Turkmenistan. One month prior to the beginning of the fiscal year the President of Turkmenistan submits to the Assembly of Turkmenistan (Mejlis) the state budget draft for consideration and adoption. The Ministry of Economy and Finance is responsible for state finances.

Budget statistics are unreliable because the government spends large amounts of extra-budgetary funds. The 2021 budget of the Turkmenistan government totaled 79.5 billion manats of revenue, down from 84.39 billion manats in 2020, and 103.57 billion manats in 2017. The 2021 expenditure budget was set at 72.1 billion manats. In November 2023 state media reported the 2022 budget as 124.299 billion manats revenue and 117,601 billion manats expenditure.

The Central Bank of Turkmenistan controls the issue of money, but does not publish data on the money supply.

The Central Bank promotes cashless transactions. In the January–April period of 2020, the volume of cashless transactions using debit cards slightly more than tripled compared to the same period in 2019, to just under 1.9 billion manat. This shift from cash to electronic payments was not without problems; shortages of cash in automatic teller machines and inadequate availability of card payment facilities at points of sale were reported.

== Industry ==
In the post-Soviet era, Turkmenistan's industrial sector has been dominated increasingly by the fuel and cotton processing industries to the detriment of light industry. Between 1991 and 2004, some 14 new cotton-processing plants were opened, sharply increasing the capability of processing domestically produced cotton. The construction industry depends mainly on government building projects because construction of private housing is a low priority.

=== Natural gas ===
Turkmenistan's natural gas reserves are estimated at 50 trillion cubic meters.

Turkmenistan's major gas deposits were discovered in its central and eastern areas in the 1940s and 1950s, and in the 1980s the republic became the second largest producer of gas in the Soviet Union, behind the Russian SFSR. During the Soviet era gas was exported mainly to other Soviet republics, as Turkmenistan steadily increased delivery from about 9.2 million m³ in 1940 to about 234 million m³ in 1960 and about 51 billion m³ in 1975. This export was under centralised control, and most of the export revenue was absorbed into the Soviet central budget.

This changed in 1991, when Turkmenistan gained independence and established full control over gas export and export revenues. However, Soviet-era pipelines dictated that much of the gas go to the Caucasus, Russia and Ukraine. In the 1990s many of Turkmenistan's gas customers in the CIS failed to pay on time or negotiated barter deals. In the mid-1990s Turkmenistan stopped delivering gas to some CIS members, citing failure to pay and unprofitable barter deals. At the same time, the government tried to attract investments in building gas pipelines via Iran to Turkey and Western Europe via Afghanistan to Pakistan. Neither deal went through due to an unfavourable regional security environment and high costs; inflation and the budget deficit rose but privatisation was resisted.

In the late 1990s the government renegotiated its export and price arrangements with Gazprom and renewed deliveries to Georgia, Ukraine, and some other countries. It also opened its first pipeline not to pass through Russia, the Korpezhe-Kurt Kui Pipeline.

On 14 December 2009, the Central Asia–China gas pipeline was opened, and Turkmenistan began delivering large volumes of natural gas to the China National Petroleum Corporation. Combined design capacity of Lines A, B, and C of this pipeline system is 55 billion cubic meters per annum (bcma), of which Turkmenistan's quota was initially 35 bcma. In 2023, the Turkmenistan Ministry of Foreign Affairs stated that Turkmenistan's quota on this pipeline system was 40 bcma. By 2015 Turkmenistan was delivering approximately 35 bcma to China, counterbalancing declining exports to Russia, which ended on 1 January 2016. Russia had earlier restricted its imports to about 10 bcma, and then 5 bcma. Russian purchases resumed, albeit in smaller quantities, in 2019.

Small-volume sales of an estimated 12 bcma to Iran halted on 1 January 2017, when Turkmenistan unilaterally cut off supplies over payment arrears. Ashgabat claimed Tehran owed some $1.8 billion for supplies delivered nearly 10 years before. In March 2025 Turkmenistan began selling natural gas to Turkey via a Turkmenistan-Iran, Iran-Turkey swap with the goal of shipping 1.3 bcm by the end of the year.

In January–November 2020, Turkmenistan extracted 62.3 billion m^{3} of natural gas, of which, according to one source, it exported 31 billion. The state-controlled official media reported in February 2024 natural gas production in calendar year 2023 as 80.6187 billion cubic meters.

One observes in the table below that production and exports peaked in 2008 and dramatically decreased in 2009. This was due an explosion in the Central Asia–Center gas pipeline system in April 2009 for which Turkmenistan blamed Gazprom. Natural gas exports include pipeline gas directly to China and Russia, and to Azerbaijan via a swap with Iran, plus liquid petroleum gas shipped by rail and truck to Afghanistan.

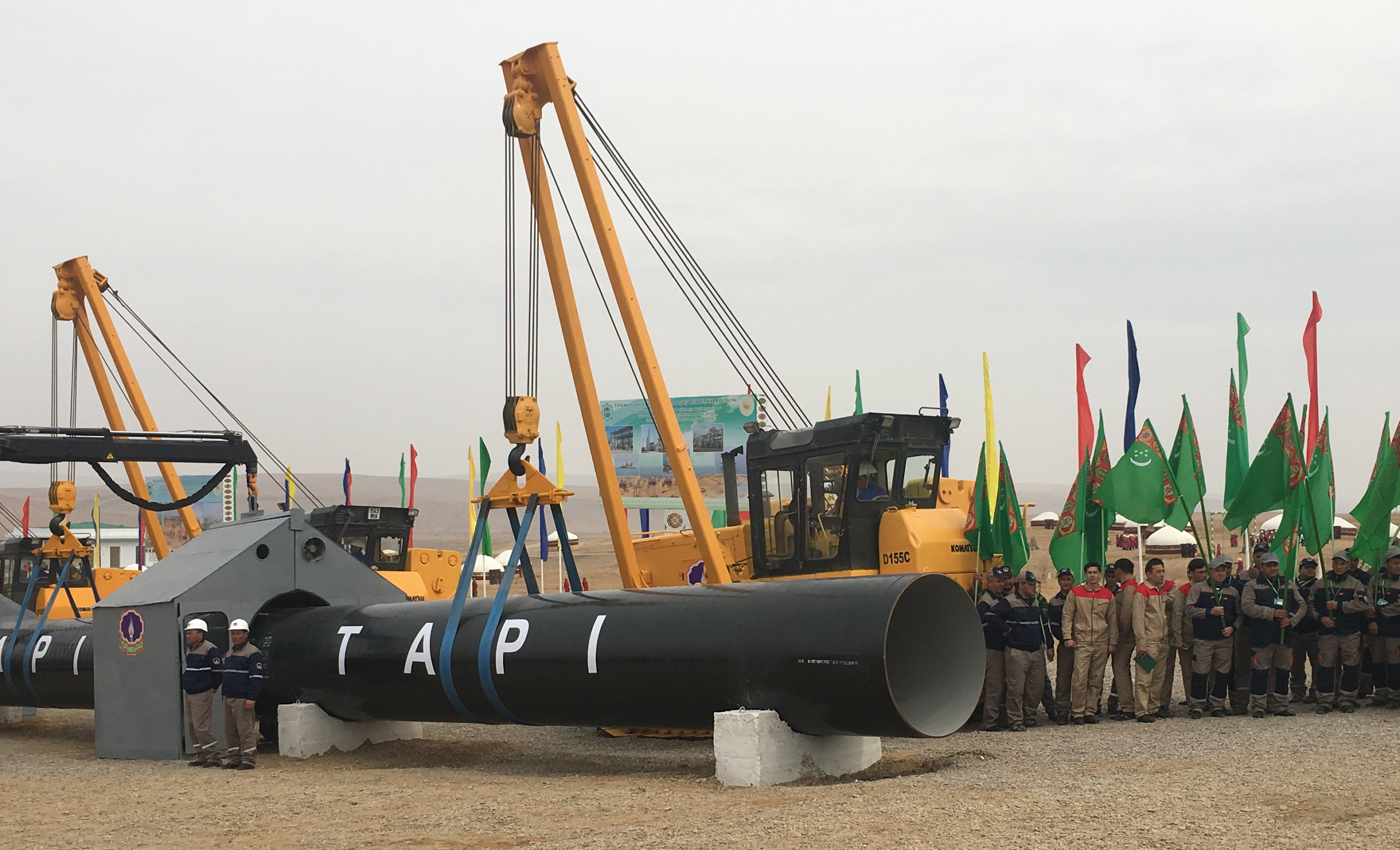
Ceremony on completion of the Turkmen section of the Turkmenistan-Afghanistan-Pakistan-India natural gas pipeline

Turkmenistan Production, Consumption, and Exports of Natural Gas billion cubic meters per annum (bcma) Source: BP Statistical Review
Year	Production	Consumption	Exports	Exports to Russia	Exports to China	Exports to Iran
2005	57.0	16.1	40.9	35.1	0	5.8
2008	66.1	20.5	45.6	39.1	0	6.5
2009	36.4	19.9	16.7	10.7	0	5.8
2010	42.4	22.6	19.7	9.7	3.5	6.5
2011	59.5	25.0	34.5	10.1	14.3	10.2
2012	62.3	23.3	41.1	9.9	21.3	9.0
2013	62.3	22.3	40.1	9.9	24.4	4.7
2014	63.5	20.0	n/a	n/a	n/a	n/a
2015	65.9	25.4	n/a	n/a	n/a	n/a
2016	63.2	25.1	n/a	n/a	n/a	n/a
2017	58.7	24.8	n/a	n/a	n/a	n/a
2018	61.5	28.4	n/a	n/a	n/a	n/a
2019	63.2	31.5	n/a	n/a	n/a	n/a

==== Methane emissions ====
In February 2022, Turkmenistan was identified as an ultra-emitter of methane by the European Space Agency's satellite-based TROPOspheric Monitoring Instrument, with the value of lost methane equalling about US$6 billion per year.

In 2025 most of the worlds largest leaks of methane, a greenhouse gas which causes climate change, were from the country, and included the Darzava gas crater. In 2026, Turkmenistan had responded to about 20% of reported leaks with plans for repairs, and completed eight repairs, which experts called "a genuine breakthrough for climate action."

==== Natural gas to gasoline production ====
On 28 June 2019, a US$1.7 billion factory for producing gasoline out of natural gas was commissioned in Ovadandepe. Built by Rönesans and Kawasaki using technology from Haldor Topsoe, the factory has a design capacity of 600,000 tonnes of gasoline, 12,000 tonnes of diesel fuel, and 115,000 tonnes of liquefied petroleum gas per year, produced from 1.7 billion cubic meters of natural gas. According to opposition media, as of January 2023 the plant had halted production of export-grade ECO-93 gasoline due to a lack of catalyzers, and was producing only lower-quality gasoline for domestic consumption.

=== Oil ===
Turkmenistan's major oil-producing area is in the west, mainly in Balkan Province, and is part of the South Caspian Basin, an intercontinental depression noted for oil production. Commercial oil production on the Turkmen side of the Caspian Sea began in the early 1900s, in the environs of the Cheleken Peninsula, and modern oil drilling began in the 1930s near Balkanabat. The Gumdag field was developed in 1949, then Goturdepe (1958), Ekerem (1962), and others. Offshore drilling began in the 1970s.

Major onshore oil fields include Çeleken, Goñurdepe, Nebitdag, Gumdag, Barsagelmez, Guýujyk. Gyzylgum, Ördekli, Gögerendag, Gamyşlyja, Ekerem, Çekişler, Keýmir, Ekizek, and Bugdaýly. In 2019, capital investment in the oil industry totalled 3.29 billion manats. In January–November 2020, Turkmenistan extracted 8.7 million tonnes of oil and condensate. Production of liquid petroleum gas totalled 231,000 tonnes. Oil production in calendar year 2023 was reported in official state media as 8.3167 million tonnes.

The oil production and consumption data in the table below are taken from BP Statistical Review.

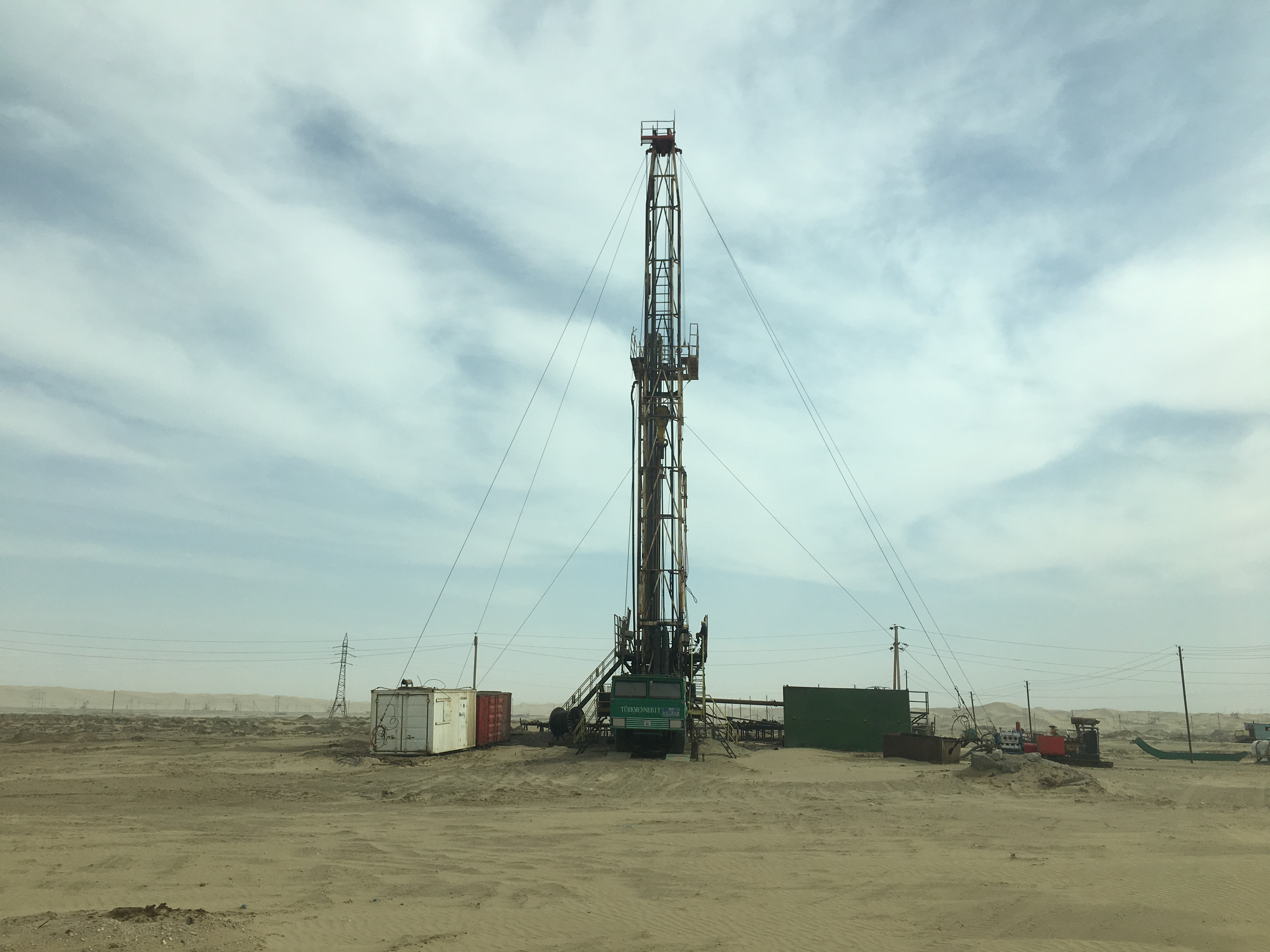
Oil drilling rig on the Cheleken Peninsula, Balkan Province, Turkmenistan

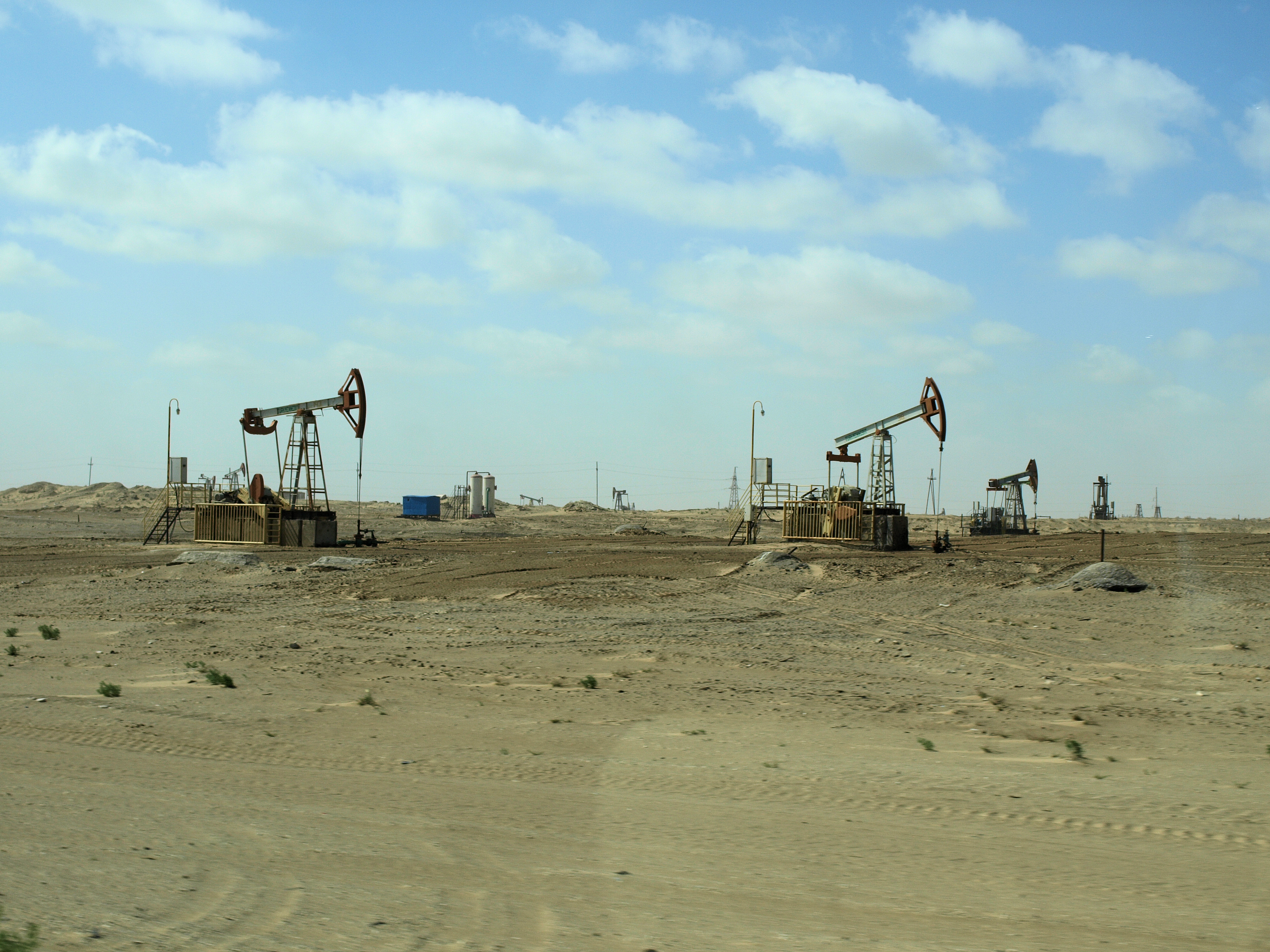
Oil well donkeys in Balkan Province, Turkmenistan

Turkmenistan Production and Consumption of Oil Source: BP Statistical Review
Year	Production (1000 bbl/day)	Production (million tonnes/year)	Consumption (million tonnes/year)
2002	183	9.0	3.9
2005	193	9.5	4.3
2008	208	10.3	5.1
2009	211	10.4	4.6
2010	217	10.7	4.5
2011	217	10.7	4.7
2012	222	11.0	4.8
2013	231	11.4	4.8
2014	263	12.9	6.5
2015	271	13.2	6.5
2016	270	13.2	6.5
2017	271	13.1	6.5
2018	261	12.6	6.7
2019	264	12.5	7.1

==== Petroleum refining ====
Oil is processed at two refineries, the Türkmenbaşy and Seydi oil refining complexes. The Turkmenbashy oil refinery had a refining capacity of more than 10 million tons of oil per year as of May 2016. The refinery produces a range of products, including unleaded gasoline, petroleum coke, asphalt, laundry detergent, hydro-treated Diesel, and lubricating oil. The Turkmenbashy oil refinery is Turkmenistan's largest producer of liquid petroleum gas, accounting for two-thirds of total production with annual output of about 300 thousand tonnes.

The Seydi refinery processed about 135,500 tonnes of oil in the first quarter of 2020, and 441,200 tonnes January–November, implying capacity of about half a million tonnes of oil in 2020 despite design capacity of 6 million tonnes. In the first eight months of 2021, the Seydi refinery produced 135,200 tonnes of gasoline, 77,600 tonnes of diesel fuel, 22,800 tonnes of heavy gas oil, and 19,500 tonnes of asphalt. The Seydi refinery was built during the Soviet period to process oil from Siberia. Since the collapse of the Soviet Union, however, the Seydi refinery has been supplied with hydrocarbons from Turkmenistan, including the Gokdumalak, Yashyldepe, Yoloten, and Kerwen fields.

In October 2020, President Gurbanguly Berdimuhamedow criticized low output from refineries, stating, "...growth is not observed in oil extraction, half of which is exported. Processing enterprises do not operate at the appropriate level, and for a long time are used at barely 40%."

=== Natural gas and oil exports ===
Based on Chinese and Turkmen official trade data, China is the major importer of Turkmenistan's natural gas, with historical volumes between 32 and 35 billion cubic meters per annum (bcma). Originally, thirty-five bcma was Turkmenistan's quota on the Central Asia–China gas pipeline, but in August 2023, the Turkmenistan Ministry of Foreign Affairs stated that Turkmenistan's quota on this pipeline system was 40 bcma. Turkmen media reported that in 2022 China imported 43.2 bcm of natural gas via that pipeline, but did not specify how much of that originated in Turkmenistan. Subsequently, press reports stated Turkmen natural gas exports to China in 2022 totalled 34.09 bcm.

Smaller volumes of pipeline gas are also bought by Russia's Gazprom, with 4 bcm in 2019, 4.7 bcm in 2020, and approximately 10 bcm in 2021. Some of this gas is sold onward to Uzbekistan. In June 2019 Russia and Turkmenistan signed a five-year agreement for annual deliveries of 5.5 bcm.

Sales of pipeline gas to Iran ceased in 2017 due to a dispute over arrears, but resumed in Summer 2023 with test shipments of 10 million cubic meters (mcm) per day. The deal, signed in June 2023, envisions export of up to 20 mcm per day of natural gas to Iran.

In November 2021, the governments of Turkmenistan, Iran, and Azerbaijan announced agreement on a natural gas swap of up to 2 billion cubic meters per year, with Turkmen gas to flow to Iran, and Iranian gas to flow to Azerbaijan. Iran's oil minister, Javad Owji, declared readiness to increase the swap volume to 15 bcma. In August 2023 media reported that the volume of gas swapped had risen from 4.5 million cubic meters per day to 8 mcm per day.

According to BP's Statistical Review of World Energy 2021, Turkmenistan's natural gas exports in 2020, by destination, in billion cubic meters were:

Kazakhstan	0.1
Russia	3.8
Other CIS	0.5
China	27.2
Total	31.6

==== Value of exports ====
Chinese sources reported that in 2021 Turkmenistan earned $6.79 billion for delivering natural gas to China. Chinese Customs statistics show China imported natural gas from Turkmenistan from January through November 2022 valued at $9.28 billion. Azerbaijan imported 857 million cubic meters (mcm) of natural gas from Turkmenistan in calendar year 2022, worth "over $130.63 million".

In June 2021 Turkmenistan and China announced award of a tender to CNPC Chuanging Drilling Engineering Company, Ltd. for drilling gas wells in the Galkynysh gas field in return for payment in kind of 17 bcm of natural gas delivered over a period of three years. The first of these wells was commissioned in January 2023.

Turkmenistan Hydrocarbon Exports
	2015		2016		2017		2018		2019	
	quantity	value, million US$	quantity	value, million US$	quantity	value, million US$	quantity	value, million US$	quantity	value, million US$
natural gas, billion cubic meters	40.3	8406.7	37.9	4327.8	38.2	5031.7	37.8	6428.0	37.6	6942.1
petroleum products, million tonnes	2.8	1038.3	2.6	796.2	2.6	1000.7	2.9	1430.1	3.1	1297.1
crude oil, million tonnes	4.1	1466.8	4.9	1210.8	1.9	612.8	6.4	2634.4	3.8	1671.5

=== Power generation ===
As of 2013, Turkmenistan had 10 electrical power plants equipped with 32 turbines, including 14 steam-driven, 15 gas powered, and 3 hydroelectric. The main gas-fired power plants are Ashgabat Power Plant and Avaza Power Plant. Power output in 2011 was 18.27 billion kWh, of which 2.5 billion kWh was exported. The Asian Development Bank reported in October 2018,

Turkmenenergo, the State Energy Corporation is the vertically integrated power utility in the country. In 2017, it produced more than 23 TWh of electricity, exporting 15% of that to neighboring countries.

In 2019, total electrical energy generation in Turkmenistan reportedly totalled 22,521.6 million kilowatt-hours (22.52 terawatt-hours).

Electrical Power Generation, million kilowatt-hours
	2015	2016	2017	2018	2019
production	23,284.5	24,525.9	24,903.9	23,817.7	22,521.6
export	3,215.3	3,751.4	3,457.8	2,719.8	1,803.5

New power plants have been constructed in Mary, Ahal province, and in Çärjew District of Lebap province. The Mary-3 combined cycle power plant, built by Çalık Holding with GE turbines, commissioned in 2018, produces 1.574 gigawatts of electrical power and is specifically intended to support expanded exports of electricity to Afghanistan and Pakistan. The Zerger power plant built by Sumitomo, Mitsubishi, Hitachi, and Rönesans Holding in Çärjew District has a design capacity of 432 megawatts from three 144-megawatt gas turbines and was commissioned in September 2021. It is also primarily intended for export of electricity. The Zerger plant uses natural gas from the Üçajy Gas Field (Russian: Учаджинского газодобывающего месторождения), delivered via a 125-km high-pressure pipeline. The Ahal power plant, with capacity of 650 megawatts, was constructed to power the city of Ashgabat and in particular the Olympic Village.

The Derweze State Electrical Power Station (Turkmen: Derweze Döwlet Elektrik Stansiýasy), a 504.4 megawatt power plant built by Çalık Enerji in 2015, is located near Ovadandepe. In March 2023, the government announced plans to build a 1,574-megawatt natural gas-fired combined cycle power plant in Balkan Province. In October 2023 the contract for construction of this plant was awarded to Çalık Energji, with construction projected to be complete by May 2027. National Leader Gurbanguly Berdimuhamedow announced in November 2023 that the power plant is intended to export electricity to Azerbaijan.

A "national grid strengthening project" with support from the Asian Development Bank is underway, which will build four new power substations and add direct high-voltage lines, a 500-kilovolt line between Balkan province and Dashoguz, and a 200-kilovolt line between Buzmeyin and Balkanabat. The intention is to create an "interconnected national transmission grid to improve reliability and energy efficiency..."

=== Minerals ===
The following table is from Mineral Industry of Turkmenistan published by the United States Geological Survey, an agency of the US government, and is thus in the public domain.

TURKMENISTAN: PRODUCTION OF MINERAL COMMODITIES^{1}
(Metric tons, gross weight, unless otherwise specified)
Commodity^{2}		2014	2015	2016	2017	2018
METALS						
Iron and steel, products, rolled e		135,000	140,000	140,000	144,000	144,000
INDUSTRIAL MINERALS
Bromine e		500	500	500	NA	NA
Cement, hydraulic e	thousand metric tons	2,900	3,300	3,500	3,600	3,800
Clay, bentonite:						
Powder e		400	400	400	420	450
Other, unspecified		7,387 r	8,000 e	8,000 e	8,400 e	9,000 e
Gypsum, mine e		107,000	110,000	110,000	110,000	110,000
Iodine e		500	500	500	510	400
Lime e		19,400	20,000	21,000	22,000	23,000
Nitrogen, N content:						
Ammonia		293,000	309,000 e	309,000 e	320,000 e	340,000 e
Urea		344,000	360,000 e	360,000 e	380,000 e	400,000 e
Potash, K_{2}O content		--	--	--	25,000 e	24,000
Salt e		91,700	100,000	100,000	100,000	100,000
Sodium, compounds, sodium sulfate e		68,000	70,000	52,000 r	26,000	26,000
Sulfur, S content e		506,000	600,000	400,000 r	200,000	200,000
MINERAL FUELS AND RELATED MATERIALS
Natural gas	million cubic meters	67,000	69,600	66,800	62,000	62,000 e
Petroleum:						
Crude, including condensate	thousand 42-gallon barrels	87,200	91,400	96,960	90,000	85,000
Refinery	do.	57,100	55,000	53,600	44,000	44,000 e
e Estimated. r Revised. do. Ditto. NA Not available. -- Zero.
^{1}Table includes data available through 20 May 2019. All data are reported unless otherwise noted. Estimated data are rounded to no more than three significant digits; may not add to totals shown.
^{2}In addition to the commodities listed, barite, bench gravel, coal, dolomite, epsomite, and kaolin may have been produced, but available information was inadequate to make reliable estimates of output.
Source: US Geological Survey

In January 2023 the deputy prime minister for industry and construction reported discovery of iron oxide deposits near Çagyl, Türkmenbaşy District, Balkan Province.

=== Construction materials ===
Four cement plants operate in Turkmenistan, and plans have been announced to construct three more. The four cement plants currently in operation, each designed to produce one million tons per year, are:

- Baherden Cement Plant (Ahal Province)
- Kelete Cement Plant (Ahal Province)
- Lebap Cement Plant (in Türkmenabat)
- Balkan Cement Plant (in Jebel)

In 2019, President Berdimuhamedov noted that the Kelete plant was operating at 8.1%, the Lebap plant at 88%, the Baherden plant at 64%, and the Balkan plant at just over 40% of design capacity.

Cement Production in Turkmenistan in thousand tonnes
2014	2015	2016	2017	2018	2019
3,401.5	3,549.9	3,550.0	2,881.4	2,651.4	1,993.2

In 2019, Turkmenistan produced 5.1 million standard square meters (4mm thickness) of sheet glass. A $375 million float glass and glass container plant built by Tepe Inşaat of Turkey was opened 14 February 2018, in Ovadandepe north of Ashgabat. It replaced a Soviet-era glass factory located in central Ashgabat. In 2019, the value of Turkmenistan's glass exports as reported by trading partners was US$9.5 million.

A steel smelter, Türkmen Demir Önümleri Döwlet Kärhanasy (English: Turkmen Iron Products State Enterprise) operating on scrap metal is located at kilometer 22 on the Ashgabat-Dashoguz Automobile Highway near Ovadandepe. It produces mainly rebar and channel iron.

The Ceramic Products Plant in Bäherden, opened on 2025, produces 3.3 million square meters of ceramic tiles and 120,000 sanitary ware units annually using local raw materials. Equipped with advanced technology from SACMI, it meets Industry 4.0 standards, is environmentally friendly, provides 460 jobs.

=== Chemicals ===
As of 2019, Turkmenistan had "nine chemical plants that produce nitrogen and phosphorus fertilizers (700,000 tons per year), sulfuric and nitric acids, iodine, bromine, and mineral salts."

In 2019, the country was the world's 3rd largest producer of iodine.

==== Petrochemicals ====
Three plants in Turkmenistan produce urea (carbamide), primarily intended for export, one each in Tejen, Mary, and Garabogaz. The $1.3 billion Garabogaz plant, built by Mitsubishi Heavy Industries and GAP İnşaat (a subsidiary of Çalık Holding), was inaugurated on 18 September 2018, with a design capacity of 1.16 million tonnes of urea per year. The US$650 million Mary ammonia and urea plant, commissioned on 17 October 2014, was built by Rönesans Holding, Kawasaki, and Sojitz with design capacity of 400 thousand tonnes of ammonia and 640 thousand tonnes of urea. The $240 million Tejen plant, inaugurated on 18 March 2005, has a design capacity of 350,000 tonnes of urea per year. Reportedly, none of these plants currently produces at full capacity, however. Between January and October 2019, the Garabogaz plant produced approximately 392,000 tonnes of urea, of which 261,000 tonnes was exported. Production of nitrogenous fertilizers in Turkmenistan totalled 550,500 tonnes (active ingredient basis) in 2019.

The Kiyanly Polymer Factory (Turkmen: Gyýanly Polimer Zawody), inaugurated 17 October 2018, features design capacity to produce 381 thousand tonnes of polyethylene and 81 thousand tonnes of polypropylene per year. Built at a cost of US$3.4 billion by LG International, Hyundai Engineering, Toyo Engineering, and Gap Inşaat, the plant cracks methane and ethane for production of polymers. In the first ten months of 2019, however, the factory produced only 67,900 tonnes of polyethylene and 12,700 tonnes of polypropylene. As of January 2023, the polymer plant had reportedly ceased operation, and it had not resumed as of a year later. Opposition media reported in May 2024 that the plant remained closed, and that Hyundai Engineering was auditing the plant to determine what was needed to refurbish and restart it, with an expected cost of repairs of one billion U.S. dollars.

==== Non-hydrocarbon chemicals ====
In March 2017 the Garlyk Mining and Enrichment Combinate for production of potash fertilizer was inaugurated. Built by Belarus's Belgorkhimprom at a cost of US$1.1 billion, the factory is designed to produce 1.4 million tonnes of fertilizer per year, primarily for export to China and India. It reportedly operates at from 2 to 7 percent of rated capacity, however.

Three factories produce iodine in Turkmenistan, one each in Balkanabat, Hazar, and Bereket. The Bereket plant is designed to produce 150 tonnes per year of iodine. Following planned renovations and upgrades, the Balkanabat and Hazar plants will have design capacities of 250 tonnes and 300 tonnes of iodine, respectively, plus 2400 tonnes and 4500 tonnes of bromine, respectively, per year. Total production of iodine in 2019 was 681.4 tonnes.

In May 2025 the president issued a decree authorizing Türkmenhimiýa to sign a contract with Daewoo Engineering & Construction Co., Ltd for construction of a fertilizer plant in Türkmenabat for production of 350,000 tonnes of superphosphate and 100,000 tonnes of ammonium sulfate per year.

=== Textiles and Garments ===
As a cotton producer, from its conquest by the Russian Empire in the 1880s until independence in 1991 Turkmenistan mainly exported raw cotton to Russia for spinning. Since independence, Turkmenistan has invested roughly $2 billion in 70 plants and factories for production of cotton yarn, textiles, and garments made from other materials, including shoes. Of these, 13 are large ginning, spinning, or textile mills. In 2019, Turkmenistan exported cotton textiles worth $123.6 million. In 2019, Turkmenistan produced 118,600 tonnes of cotton yarn, and 209.4 million square meters of fabric, of which 192.9 million was cotton, 14.9 million was terrycloth, and 1.4 million was silk. In addition, Turkmenistan produced in 2019 40.9 million pairs of stockings, 5.5 million knit items, 1.5 million pairs of shoes, and 3,400 tonnes of knitted fabric.

=== Construction ===
The Turkmenistan government centrally funds and controls major construction projects. As of January 2021, the government acknowledged over 2,500 large-scale projects under construction at a cost of $37 billion. In 2020, about two million square meters of new residential housing was built at government expense, as well as 45 "important government" structures. In 2021 construction was completed of five major facilities in Ashgabat (a new State Tribune, the Arkadag Hotel, two bank headquarters, and a new Congress Center, all by Bouygues). Total cost of these five projects was $1.5 billion.

A current major project is the $4.8 billion being spent on construction of the city of Arkadag, the new capital of Ahal province. In addition, $2.3 billion has been allocated for construction of the Ashgabat-Turkmenabat motorway by a consortium of four Turkmen construction firms.

== Services ==
=== Banking and finance ===
The financial system is under full state control. The banking system, which was reduced substantially after the 1998 financial crisis, includes 9 national banks. These include a nominally private bank owned by the Union of Industrialists and Entrepreneurs, Rysgal Bank, and Turkmen-Turkish Bank, a joint venture between Dayhan Bank and Turkish state-owned Ziraat Bankası. These institutions have the same basic division of responsibility as in the Soviet era, overseen by the Central Bank of Turkmenistan. Lending operations and household savings have not been important functions of this system. In 2005 an estimated 95 percent of loans went to state enterprises. Two branches of foreign banks, National Bank of Pakistan and Iran Saderat Bank, are located in Ashgabat, where they offer retail banking services. Two German banks, Deutsche Bank and Commerzbank, offer institutional services through offices in Ashgabat.

As of 1 January 2021, total assets of all banks in Turkmenistan amounted to 135.8 billion manats. Deposits by individuals totalled 3.3 billion manats, including 2.8 billion in demand deposits and 437 million manats in time deposits. Business deposits totalled 39.1 billion manats, of which 14.6 billion in demand deposits and 53.7 billion in time deposits. Total business deposits were broken out into state-owned firms (32.5 billion manats), privately owned firms (21.1 billion manats), and individual unincorporated entrepreneurs (7.9 billion manats).

In 2019, 84.1 billion manats worth of credit was extended to individuals, firms, and organizations, up from 76.3 billion in 2018 and 69.2 billion in 2017. Of these figures, 60.9 billion, 52.1 billion, and 46.7 billion were in Turkmen manats, respectively.

==== Credit and debit cards ====
Several types of national plastic cards are used in Turkmenistan: Milli Kart, Altyn Asyr, Turkmen Kart. The number of bank cards issued in Turkmenistan for 2023 amounted to over 5 million 177 thousand units, according to the Central Bank of Turkmenistan. Cashback services are provided by Halkbank, Daykhanbank, Rysgal Bank, Senagat Bank, Turkmenbashi Bank, Turkmenistan Bank, Turkmen-Turkish Joint-Stock Commercial Bank. Cashback amounts range from 2% to 3%. In Turkmenistan, the card can be used to pay not only for purchases in a store, but also for the services of healthcare institutions, utility bills and services of all types of communications and the Internet, railway, bus and air tickets. In 2019, contactless payment technology was introduced in the country for the first time.

The number of ATMs in 2023 in the country was 2,144 devices with 42,131 bank payment terminals. The number of users of the Internet Bank service reached 932,730 people with the Mobile Bank service reaching 60,654.

Turkmen banks have the ability to issue new Visa, MasterCard and Maestro cards. Using MasterCard and VISA plastic cards supported by international payment systems, citizens of Turkmenistan can make non-cash payments and withdraw funds from ATMs in foreign countries.

==== Insurance ====
The State Insurance Organization of Turkmenistan (Turkmengosstrakh) is the state insurance firm.

=== Healthcare ===
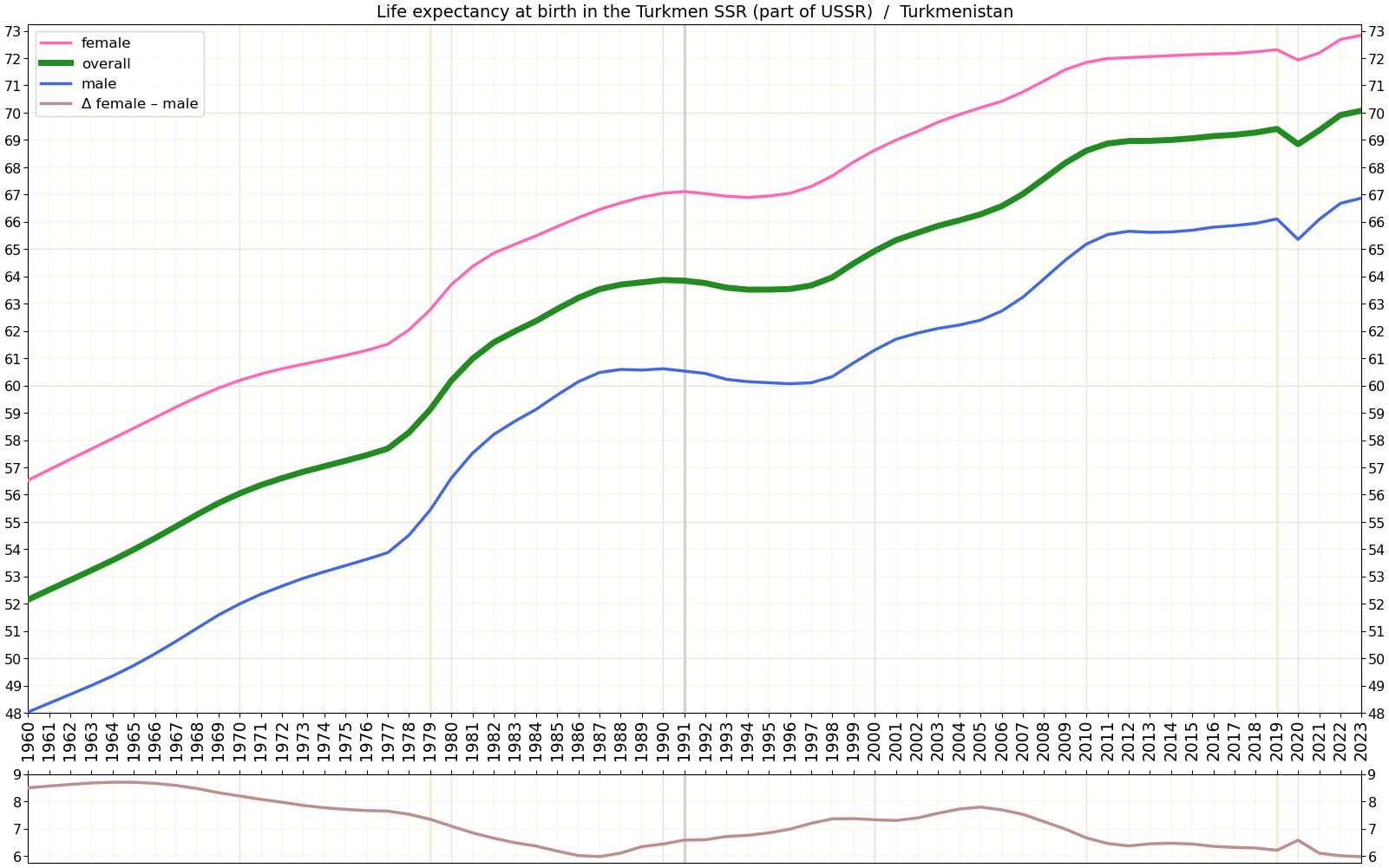
Life expectancy development in Turkmenistan by gender

Healthcare in Turkmenistan encompasses a number of institutions and practices throughout the country of Turkmenistan. In the post-Soviet era, reduced funding has put the health system in poor condition. In 2002 Turkmenistan had 50 hospital beds per 10,000 population, less than half the number in 1996. Overall policy has targeted specialized inpatient facilities to the detriment of basic, outpatient care. Since the late 1990s, many rural facilities have closed, making care available principally in urban areas. President Nyýazow’s 2005 proposal to close all hospitals outside Ashgabat intensified this trend. Physicians are poorly trained, modern medical techniques are rarely used, and medications are in short supply. Doctors and pharmacists were required to study the works of Avicenna and tested on their knowledge of Saparmyrat Nyýazow's spiritual writings, the Ruhnama. In 2004 Nyýazow dismissed 15,000 medical professionals, exacerbating the shortage of personnel. In some cases, professionals have been replaced by military conscripts. Private health care is rare, as the state maintains a near monopoly. Free public health care was abolished in 2004.

Nyýazow's successor, Gurbanguly Berdimuhamedow was a dentist, and took a rather more positive approach to healthcare. Money was invested to modernize the health-care sector, building "gleaming" new medical facilities. He initiated an annual Month of Health and Sports, which involved people throughout the country taking long walks in parks and compulsory physical fitness classes at workplaces. $56 million was spent on an ophthalmology complex in Ashgabat and $47 million in a traumatology centre. The rural hospitals reopened, but they had severe shortages of the most basic medical equipment and hygiene standards were poor. Theoretically the state-funded health insurance covers part of the cost of hospital treatment and medication in public medical facilities, but there are widespread reports of bribery and corruption. There is an acute shortage of clinical staff and political pressure, for example discouraging from diagnoses of HIV .

=== Telecommunications ===
Turkmenistan has a state-controlled press and monitored communication systems. Turkmenistan's telecommunications services are considered to be the least developed of all the Commonwealth of Independent States (CIS) countries. Overall, the telecom market in this predominantly rural country is relatively small but has been trying boldly to expand in recent years. The state-owned Turkmen Telecom has been the primary provider of public telephone, email and internet services, and through a subsidiary has been operating a GSM mobile network in competition with a private mobile operator, BCTI (BCTI became MTS Turkmenistan in 2005).

=== Transport ===
As a crossroads for centuries and part of the Silk Road, Turkmenistan serves as a transit point for cargoes shipped by air, sea, and land. Under normal conditions, Ashgabat International Airport is a stopover and transfer point for air passengers between India (Amritsar and New Delhi) and England (London and Birmingham), as well as between Frankfurt-am-Main and Bangkok.

==== Seaports ====
Turkmenistan's major seaport is the Turkmenbashy International Seaport on the Caspian. Expanded at a cost of $2 billion between 2013 and 2018 by Gap Inşaat, the seaport has capacity to handle annually 25 million tonnes of dry cargo (17 million in the newly expanded port, 8 million in the old port), 300,000 passengers, 75,000 freight trucks, and 400,000 containers. The port features regular ferry service to Baku. This seaport also manages three oil loading terminals, Kenar, Alaja, and Ekerem. Turkmenistan's only other seaports are the loading terminals for factories at Kiyanly (Gyýanly) and Garabogaz and an oil loading terminal at Hazar.

==== Airports ====
Five major airports in Turkmenistan feature regular domestic passenger service: Ashgabat, Dashoguz, Mary, Turkmenabat, and Turkmenbashy. A sixth international-class airport at Kerki was commissioned in June 2021 and was slated to begin regular domestic passenger service in January 2022. A seventh airport, Balkanabat, is in operation for special flights. Under normal conditions, only Ashgabat International Airport offers regular international passenger service. Turkmenbashy International Airport is used for international cargo, chiefly by Cargolux. The lone domestic air carrier is state-owned Türkmen Howa Ýollary (Turkmenistan Airlines). In 2019, Turkmenistan Airlines hauled 12 thousand tonnes of cargo. It also flew 2.5 million passengers and 2.98 billion passenger-kilometers.

Minor airports are found in some smaller cities and towns, including Balkanabat, Etrek, Garabogaz, Hazar, and Jebel in Balkan Province. A former military airfield at Galaýmor in Mary Province is slated for conversion to civil aviation. There are also small landing strips at Aeroport village and Gäwers in Ahal Province.

==== Rail ====
The domestic rail system is operated by state-owned Türkmendemirýollary (Turkmen Railways). No scheduled international passenger service exists, but domestic passenger service connects major Turkmen cities. Freight service is available to both domestic and international destinations. In 2019, 23.8 million tonnes of freight was transported by rail in Turkmenistan. In the same year, Turkmen Railways handled 5.44 million passengers and counted 2.53 billion passenger-kilometers.

==== Roads ====
As of 2011, Turkmenistan featured 13.7 thousand kilometers of roads, of which 12.3 thousand were paved. In 2019, road transport accounted for 27.1 billion passenger-kilometers, or 83% of passenger traffic in Turkmenistan. Motor vehicles transported 448.9 million tonnes of cargo in 2019, 85.5% of the total, and accounted for 14.2 billion tonne-kilometers. Major highways in Turkmenistan include the M37 connecting the seaport at Türkmenbaşy to the border with Uzbekistan at Farap, the Ashgabat-Dashoguz Highway connecting Ashgabat and Dashoguz, and the P-7 highway connecting the M37 at Tejen to the border with Iran at Sarahs.

=== Tourism ===
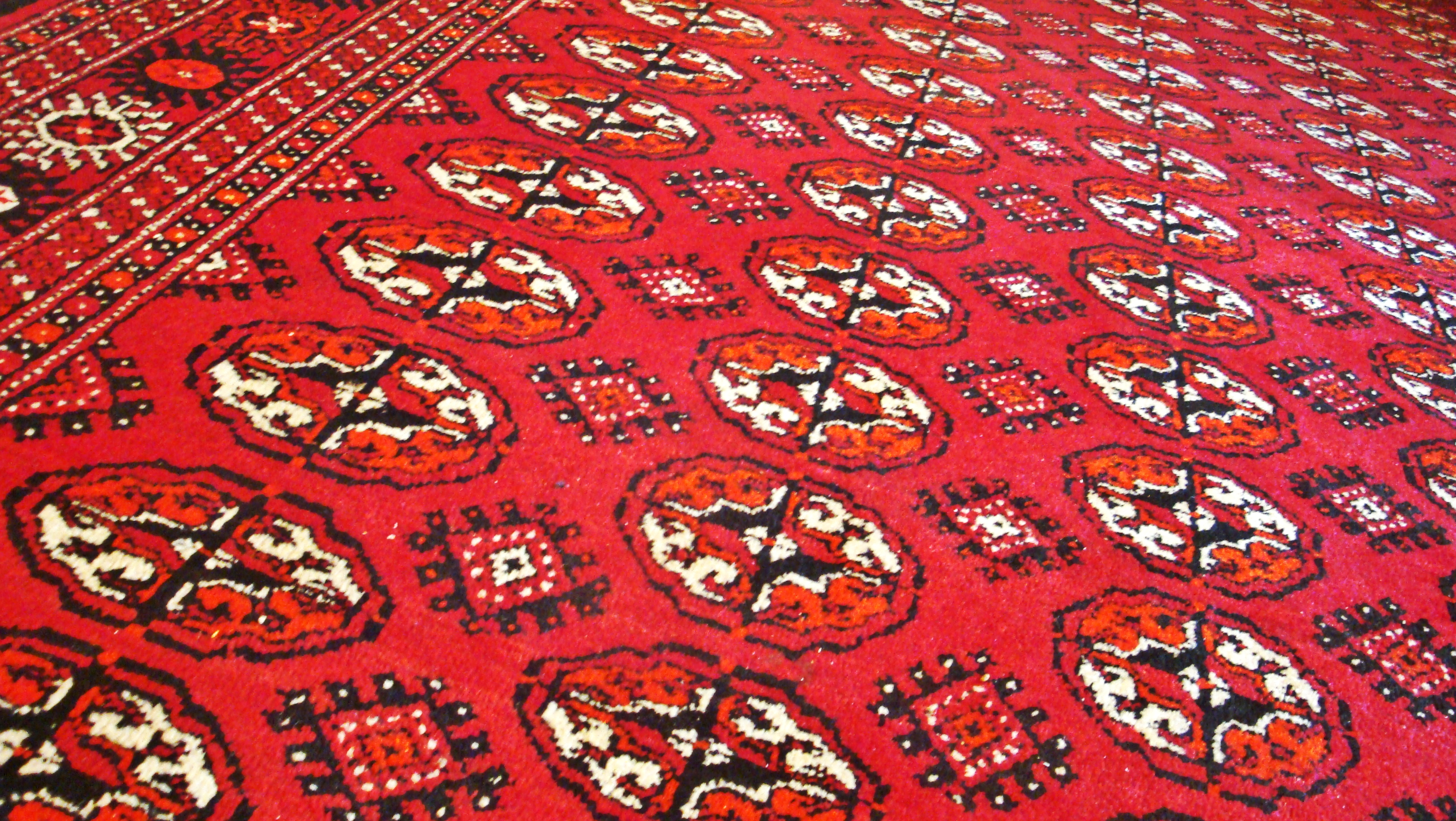
Turkmen Carpet, is an intanngible heritage of Turkmenistan

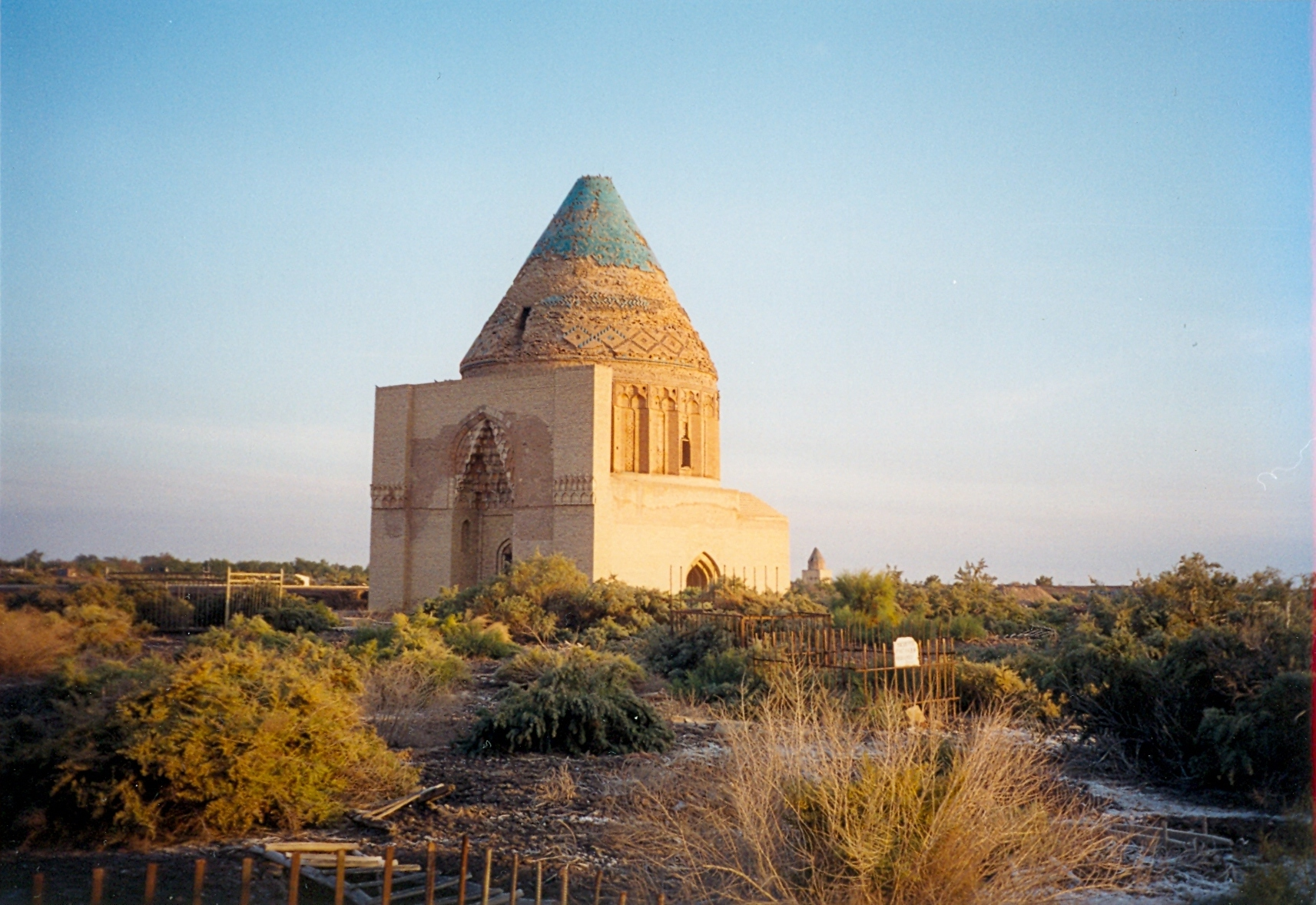
Sultan Tekesh Mausoleum, Konye-Urgench

Tourism is a small industry in Turkmenistan, serving just over 14,000 visitors in 2019. Tourist destinations include World Heritage Sites, museums, and natural sites. Many of its Central Asian cities were main points of trade on the Silk Road, linking Eastern and Western civilizations. Many neighboring countries (including Kazakhstan, Uzbekistan, and Iran) promote their countries based on their location along the Great Silk Road. Tourists from abroad are deterred by the restrictive visa policy regime with all countries of the world. Tourism is regulated by the Tourism Committee of Turkmenistan.

== Agriculture and fishing ==
In the early 2000s, the contribution of Turkmenistan's state-run agriculture sector to gross domestic product increased under close state supervision. The top crop in terms of area planted is wheat (761 thousand hectares in 2019), followed by cotton (551 thousand hectares in 2019). In recent years state policy makers have increased the range of crops with the aim of making Turkmenistan self-sufficient in food. In the post-Soviet era, the area planted to grains (mainly wheat) has nearly tripled. However, most agricultural land is of poor quality and requires irrigation. Turkmenistan's irrigation infrastructure and water-use policies have not responded efficiently to this need. Irrigation in areas distant from natural rivers depends mainly on the decrepit Karakum Canal, which carries water across Turkmenistan from the Amu Darya to near Bereket. The Dostluk Dam, opened at Sarahs on the border with Iran in 2005, has increased available irrigation water and improved efficiency. Plans call for a similar dam on the Atrek River.

In 2019, Turkmenistan produced:

- 1.5 million tons of wheat;
- 582 thousand tons of cotton;
- 356 thousand tons of tomato;
- 315 thousand tons of potato;
- 263 thousand tons of watermelon;
- 246 thousand tons of grape;
- 245 thousand tons of sugar beet, which is used to produce sugar and ethanol;
- 130 thousand tons of rice;
- 74 thousand tons of onion;
- 71 thousand tons of carrot;
- 66 thousand tons of apple;
- 34 thousand tons of apricot;

in addition to other agricultural products.

During the 2020 season, Turkmenistan reportedly produced roughly 1.5 million tons of raw cotton. Prior to imposition of a ban on export of raw cotton in October 2018, Turkmenistan exported raw cotton to Russia, Iran, South Korea, United Kingdom, China, Indonesia, Turkey, Ukraine, Singapore and the Baltic states. Beginning in 2019, the Turkmenistan government shifted focus to export of cotton yarn and finished textiles and garments.

Private farmers grow most of Turkmenistan's fruits and vegetables (chiefly tomatoes, watermelons, grapes, and onions), but all production phases of the main cash crops—grain and cotton—remain under state control. In 2006 grain crop failures led to steadily increasing bread lines and reinstatement of a rationing system in most regions. At the root of those failures was a culture of falsifying output figures together with poor administration of the sector.

Since 2018, independent media have reported food shortages in the country, with hundreds of people queuing for hours to buy bread and flour. Despite official government figures indicating good harvests, independent media report low output due to drought and mismanagement, and that shortages of flour and bread have reappeared.

=== Mechanization of agriculture ===
Since independence, the Turkmenistan government has spent considerable sums on imported agricultural tractors, harvesters, and implements. In 2012, around 7,000 tractors, 5,000 cotton cultivators, 2,200 seeders, and other machines, mainly procured from Belarus and the United States, were used.

John Deere and Case IH each began selling farm machinery in Turkmenistan in 1994. Claas combines were first used for grain harvesting in Turkmenistan in 2011. Belarus tractors, in use since Soviet times, continue to be popular due to competitive pricing and deep familiarity with the product line. Turkmenistan also buys cotton harvesters from Uzbekistan.

Between 2017 and 2020 Claas delivered 1,000 Tucano 420 grain combines, 800 Axion 850 plowing tractors, and 1,550 Axos 340 tractors. In the 2017 and 2018 crop years John Deere delivered 440 Model 9970 cotton harvesters, and between 2019 and 2020 another 600.

== Trade and investment ==
Exports of Turkmenistan by product category (2019) Chemical products Transportation Machines Mineral products Plastics and rubbers Metals Foodstuffs Precious metals Textiles Instruments Animal products Vegetable products Paper goods Footwear and headwear Miscellaneous Stone and glass Wood products Animal and vegetable bi-products Animal hides Arts and antiques Weapons

Turkmenistan's most important export commodity is natural gas, delivered by pipelines to China and in lesser quantities to Russia and via a swap through Iran to Azerbaijan, and by road and rail to Afghanistan as liquid petroleum gas. According to Chinese Customs data, the value of Chinese imports of natural gas from Turkmenistan fell from US$8,686,022,768 in 2019 to US$6,071,165,273 in 2020 due to a combination of reduced Chinese import volumes and falling hydrocarbon prices. Crude oil and refined petroleum products accounted for another US$3 billion of exports in 2019, followed by US$123.6 million for cotton textiles. Among imports, major categories in 2019 were machinery (US$1.5 billion), base metals (US$968.3 million), chemicals (US$682.3 million), vehicles (US$453.5 million), and plastic and rubber and products thereof (US$342.9 million).

In March 2023 the Turkmenistan parliament passed a law adopting the Harmonized System of tariff nomenclature.

The following table presents the value of Turkmenistan's exports and imports in millions of US dollars, by year, from 2015 through 2019.

	2015	2016	2017	2018	2019
exports	12,164.0	7,520.1	7,787.9	11,650.9	11,103.8
imports	14,051.4	13,176.8	10,188.6	5,322.9	5,831.7

== Labour ==
In 2019, Turkmenistan counted 666,500 employees of large- and medium enterprises, and 103,900 employees of non-state (private, mixed public-private, or foreign) enterprises. The structure of employment was 25.3% in the state sector, 50.3% in the private sector, 22.0% mixed public-private enterprises, 0.2% in public associations, 0.4% in cooperatives, and 1.8% in foreign-owned enterprises, including joint ventures. According to official statistics, in 2019 77,474 individuals were employed by individual entrepreneurs, including self employment.

Major sectors for employment were:

43.5% in agriculture
9.8% in manufacturing
8.4% in education
7.4% in trade and vehicle repair
5.8% in construction
4.3% in transport and storage
3.6% in health and social work
2.9% in arts, entertainment

The average monthly wage in 2019 was 1,685.10 manats per month, up from 943.40 in 2012 and 507 in 2007.

In 2004 the labour force was estimated to include more than 2.3 million workers, 48.2 percent of whom worked in agriculture, 37.8 percent in services, and 14 percent in industry and construction. Because the state dominates the economy, an estimated 90 percent of workers are in reality effectively state employees. It is believed that downsizing the government workforce, which began in 2003, increased unemployment in subsequent years. Unemployment in 2014 was estimated at 11%. In recent years, due to the economic downturn linked to falling hydrocarbon prices, unemployment is estimated to be as high as 60 percent, despite official figures of less than four percent.

== Privatization ==
According to official statistics, between 1994 and the end of 2020, 2,628 former state-owned properties had been privatized.

The breakout by type of enterprise privatized was:

845 wholesale and retail trade, vehicle repair
143 manufacturing
108 real estate operations
95 agriculture, forestry, fisheries
51 transportation and storage
27 construction
18 hospitality industry
1,341 other services

In March 2021, President Berdimuhamedow ordered conversion of Derýaýollary Production Association, a subordinate unit of the State Service of Maritime and River Transportation of Turkmenistan (Türkmendeňizderýaýollary) state agency responsible for river and canal transport, into an open joint-stock company.

All land remains property of the government, as during the Soviet era.

== Macro-economic trends ==
The following table shows the main official economic indicators in 1993–2020 as provided by the Turkmenistan government to the International Monetary Fund. Inflation below 5% is in green.

Year	GDP (in bil. US$ PPP)	GDP per capita (in US$ PPP)	GDP (in bil. US$ nominal)	GDP growth (real)	Inflation (in Percent)	Government debt (in % of GDP)
1993	10.9	2,975	15.9	▼−10.0%	▲3,102.4%	n/a
1995	▼8.9	▼2,070	▼12.7	▼−7.2%	▲1,005.2%	n/a
2000	▲11.6	▲2,554	▲16.8	▲18.6%	▲23.6%	▲44%
2005	▲27.5	▲5,755	▲39.9	▲13.0%	▲10.7%	▼5%
2006	▲31.4	▲6,509	▲45.6	▲11.0%	▲8.2%	▼3%
2007	▲35.8	▲7,335	▲52.1	▲11.1%	▲6.3%	▼2%
2008	▲41.9	▲8,478	▲60.9	▲14.7%	▲14.5%	▲3%
2009	▲44.8	▲8,954	▲65.0	▲6.1%	▲−2.7%	▼2%
2010	▲49.6	▲9,740	▲76.5	▲9.2%	▲4.4%	▲4%
2011	▲58.0	▲11,212	▲88.1	▲14.7%	▲5.3%	▲10%
2012	▲65.6	▲12,455	▲90.1	▲11.0%	▲5.3%	▲18%
2013	▲73.5	▲13,687	▼89.5	▲10.2%	▲6.8%	▲20%
2014	▲82.5	▲15,093	▲94.1	▲10.3%	▲6.0%	▼17%
2015	▲88.8	▲15,952	▼93.8	▲6.4%	▲7.4%	▲22%
2016	▲95.5	▲16,922	▼90.5	▲6.2%	▲3.6%	▲24%
2017	▼81.8	▼14,324	▲100.0	▲6.5%	▲8.0%	▲31%
2018	▲88.9	▲15,048	▲103.3	▲6.2%	▲13.3%	31%
2019	▲96.2	▲15,766	▼101.6	▲6.3%	▲5.1%	▲33%
2020	▲99.3	▲15,810	▼99.9	▲1.8%	▲8.0%	▼31%

The accuracy of GDP figures has been called into doubt by the Asian Development Bank, which in 2006 noted, "According to official statistics, the economy continued to grow rapidly in 2005, but actual growth was likely much lower than the official estimate. Government has overstated growth in the past." The UK government's Overseas Business Risk report for 2021 notes, "No reliable economic data are published in Turkmenistan. Most sources cite figures which the government releases to the international financial institutions. These do not always square with observation on the ground." Outside observers have also expressed skepticism about the official figures for the rate of inflation. In the June 2021 Global Economic Prospects report, the World Bank excluded Turkmenistan "[d]ue to lack of reliable data of adequate quality".

At a session of the Cabinet of Ministers on 11 March 2021, government officials revealed that in "recent years" Turkmenistan had borrowed over US$14 billion in foreign exchange loans from foreign creditors, of which US$5 billion remained outstanding as of 8 March 2021. However, a chart shown on television indicated debt in 2021 of US$1.3524 billion. Opposition media seized on this figure to estimate GDP of US$12.3 billion based on a statement by Central Bank Chairman Rahimberdi Jepbarov that external debt equals 11% of GDP.

In June 2021, official state media reported that debts to China for construction of natural gas pipelines had been paid in full.

== Miscellaneous statistics ==
Exchange rates prior to 2009

During the early years of independence, the official exchange rate of the Turkmen manat to the US dollar grew dramatically. At the same time, the black-market exchange rate grew even faster, eventually hovering around 24,000 to 25,000 manats to the dollar.

Manat to dollar exchange rate
Date	Rate
January 1996	2,400
January 1997	4,070
January 1999	5,350
January 2000	5,200

== See also ==
- List of companies of Turkmenistan
- Corruption in Turkmenistan
- Ministry of Energy (Turkmenistan)
- Ministry of Finance (Turkmenistan)
- Central Bank of Turkmenistan
- Economy of Central Asia
