= Oil and natural gas refining in Turkmenistan =

Turkmenistan, a country rich in both oil and natural gas, has developed a sub-sector in its economy related to the refining of those two sorts of fossil fuels.

== Oil refining ==
There are two oil refineries in Turkmenistan, located in the cities of Türkmenbaşy and Seýdi.

The Türkmenbaşy oil refinery is the larger of the two refineries, with a capacity of more than 10 million tons of oil per year. The refinery produces a range of products, including unleaded gasoline, petroleum coke, asphalt, laundry detergent, hydro-treated diesel, and lube oil. The Turkmen government has demonstrated interest in attracting foreign investment to build factories producing end-user petroleum based products such as detergents and tires. The refinery reported that its products are exported to Russia, China, Iran, Afghanistan, Turkey, Pakistan, Tajikistan, and Japan.

Turkmenistan has invested US$900 million in a number of projects designed to help increase the country's refining capacity by 95 percent by 2030. The projects include the construction of a facility for coking (carbonization) and tar de-asphalting with annual capacity of 900,000 and 500,000 tons, respectively. The government of Turkmenistan also constructed a facility to produce asphalt with an annual capacity of 38,000 tons as well as a facility to produce polypropylene film and an oil refinery with a capacity of 3 billion tons per year. Turkmenistan has commissioned a feasibility study regarding the construction of a new oil refinery in its Balkan province.

== Natural gas refining ==
Sysmic and geological research was conducted in the Caspian Sea with the help of the United States in 2000, which showed the presence of 11,000,000,000 tons of oil and 5,500,000,000,000 cubic metres (1.9×10^{14} cu ft) of gas on the coast of the country. Historically, Turkmenistan has been a heavy exporter of natural gas, exporting nearly 80% of its raw material produced. As of the 2010s, however, the country has increasingly faced a difficult time in increasing its exports of natural gas. In response, the government plans to refine natural gas to make chemicals such as methanol, synthetic rubber, and materials for paint. In October 2018, the government opened a chemical facility in the Balkan Region of Turkmenistan to create polyethylene and polypropylene, in contract with LG International, Toyo Engineering, and Hyundai Engineering. The facility cost US$3.4 billion to build, and is capable of converting 5,000,000,000 cubic metres (1.8×10^{11} cu ft) of natural gas into 81,000 tons of polypropylene as well as 386,000 tons of polyethylene every year.

The government also created a facility to convert natural gas to gasoline, in the Ahal Region of Turkmenistan. It was first conceived in 2013 by a contract including Türkmengaz, Rönesans Türkmen, and Kawasaki Heavy Industries. It cost US$1.7 billion to build, and was opened in 2019. The plant is capable of converting 1,785,000,000 cubic metres (6.30×10^{10} cu ft) of natural gas into 600,000 tons of A-92 gasoline every year.

In addition to gasoline, the government has sought to convert natural gas to liquid petroleum. A new facility was announced in April 2016 by the Turkmenistan Ministry of Oil & Gas, created by a contract that includes South Korean LG International Corp., Hyundai Engineering Co, and the Japanese Itochu Corporation. It is projected to convert 3,700,000,000 cubic metres (1.3×10^{11} cu ft) into 1.1 million tons of diesel fuel and over 400,000 tons of naphtha every year. The country has plans to build additional gas to liquids plants in the coming years.

For decades, Turkmenistan had a dispute with Azerbaijan regarding the ownership of a large oil and gas block located inside the exclusive economic zone of both countries in the Caspian Sea. In 2021, the two countries signed a memorandum of understanding in Ashgabat to conduct joint exploration and field development activities. Following the 2022 Russian invasion of Ukraine and the subsequent gas dispute, Turkmenistan was considered as an alternative supplier to Europe.

In July 2022, the Turkmenistan started extraction from a new gas plant in the Mary Region.
