= Energy in Turkmenistan =

Turkmenistan is an exporter of natural gas and oil. As of 2025, the country has large deposits of both. It has proven natural gas reserves of over 13.3 trillion cubic metres (470×10^{12} cu ft), the fifth most in the world, and oil reserves of 600 million barrels, ranking it 45th. Domestically, from 1993 to 2018 the government provided free gas and electricity to its people.

== Government supervision ==
The Ministry of Energy oversees the country's energy sector. Any foreign companies interested in the country's natural gas or oil resources must partner with either Türkmengaz, the national natural gas company, or Türkmennebit, the national oil company.

== Natural gas ==
In 2024, 77.6 billion cubic metres (2.74×10^{12} cu ft) of natural gas was extracted, ranking the country 12th in the world; 43.2 billion cubic metres (1.53×10^{12} cu ft) was consumed locally and the rest exported, primarily to China. In 2026. exports to China amounted to either around 40 billion cubic metres (1.4×10^{12} cu ft), according to President of Turkmenistan Gurbanguly Berdimuhamedow, or about 30 billion cubic metres (1.1×10^{12} cu ft), according to China's ambassador to Turkmenistan. As of 2019, over half of exports to China were delivered via the Central Asia–China gas pipeline.

== Oil ==
There are two oil refineries in Turkmenistan, in the cities of Türkmenbaşy and Seýdi. The larger, in Türkmenbaşy, is capable of refining more than 10 million tons of oil annually. Exports go to Russia, China, Iran, Afghanistan, Turkey, Pakistan, Tajikistan and Japan.

== Formerly free energy for residents ==
In 1993, then President Saparmurat Niyazov ordered that gas, electricity and water be provided free of charge to all residents of the country; that policy came to an end after 25 years in 2018, amid an economic crisis.

== See also ==
- Oil and natural gas refining in Turkmenistan
