= Lakhta Center =

Skyscraper in Saint Petersburg, Russia

Coordinates: 59°59′13″N 30°10′41″E

- Лахта-центр
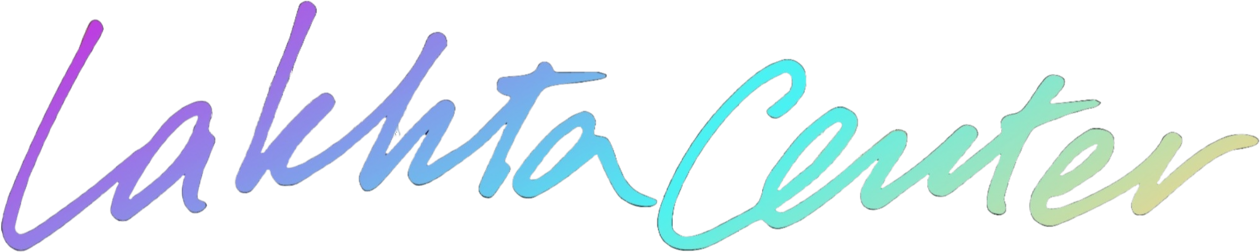

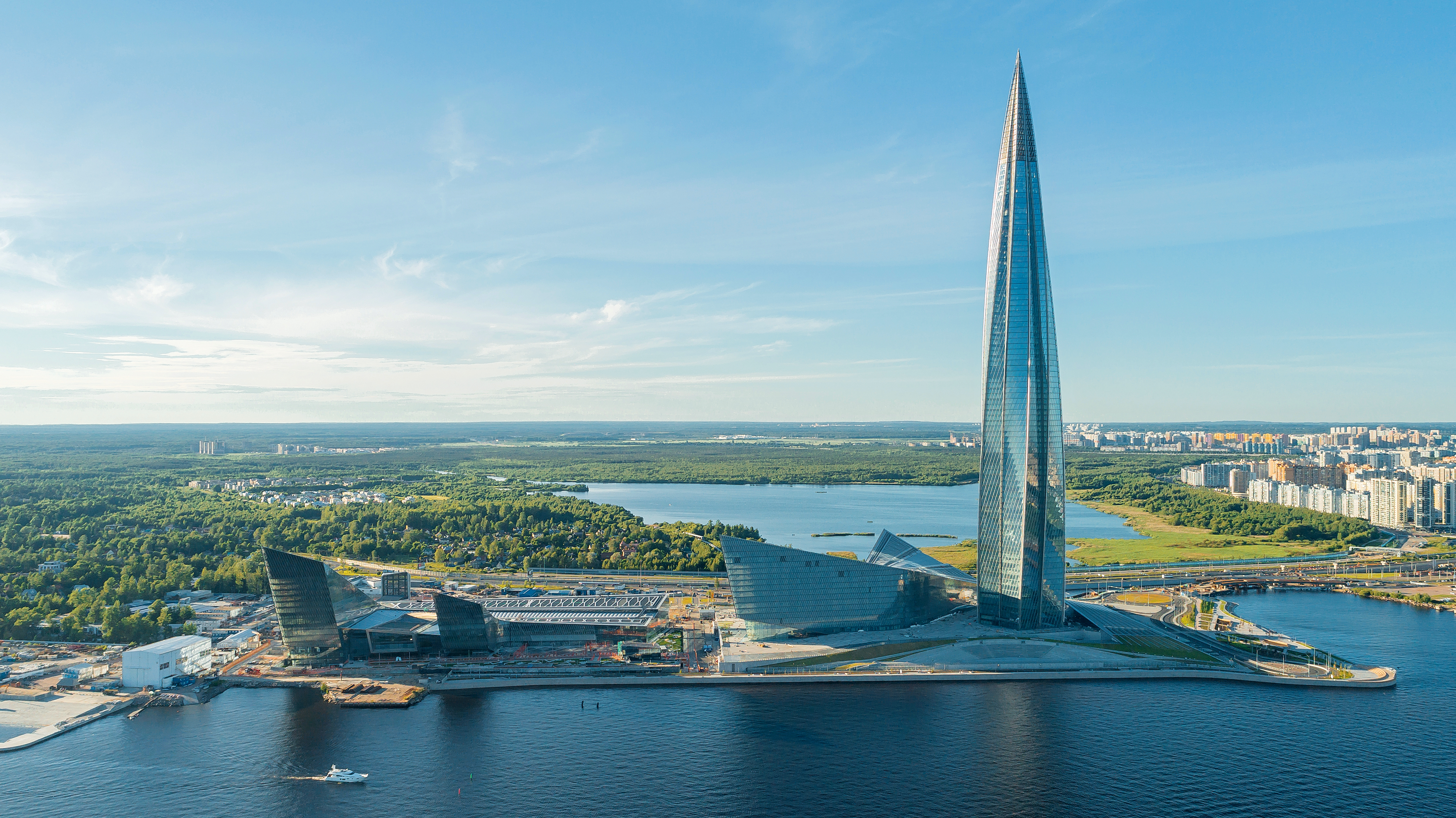
- The Lakhta Center in 2021

Record height
- Tallest in Russia and Europe since 2017^{[I]}
- Preceded by: Federation Tower

General information
- Status: Completed
- Type: Office
- Architectural style: Neo-futurism
- Location: Lakhta, Saint Petersburg, Lakhtinskij Prospect 2, Russia
- Construction started: 2012; 14 years ago
- Completed: 2019; 7 years ago
- Cost: US$1.77 billion
- Owner: Gazprom

Height
- Architectural: 462 m (1,516 ft)
- Observatory: 357 m (1,171 ft)

Technical details
- Floor count: 87 above ground; 3 below ground
- Floor area: 163,000 m^{2} (1,750,000 ft^{2})

Design and construction
- Architecture firm: RMJM (until 2011), GORPROJECT
- Structural engineer: Gorproject, Inforceproject
- Main contractor: Rönesans Holding

Website
- lakhta.center

The Lakhta Center (Russian: Ла́хта-це́нтр, romanized: Lahta tsentr) is an 87-story skyscraper built in the northwestern neighborhood of Lakhta in Saint Petersburg, Russia. Standing 462 metres (1,516 ft) tall, it is the tallest building in both Russia and Europe, and the sixteenth-tallest building in the world. It is also the second-tallest structure in Russia and Europe, behind the Ostankino Tower in Moscow, in addition to being the second-tallest twisted building and the northernmost skyscraper in the world.

Construction of the Lakhta Center started on 30 October 2012, with the building topping out on 29 January 2018. It surpassed the Vostok Tower of the Federation Towers in Moscow as the tallest building in Russia and Europe on 5 October 2017. The center is designed for large-scale mixed-use development, consisting of public facilities and offices. First designed by British architectural firm RMJM, the project was then continued by Gorproject (2011–2017) under the main contractor, Turkish company Rönesans Holding.

On 24 December 2018, the Lakhta Center was certified according to the criteria of ecological efficiency at LEED Platinum. In August 2021, Gazprom, formerly headquartered in Moscow, completed its re-registration process in Saint Petersburg. The new address of the company is at the Lakhta Center Multifunctional Complex.

== History ==
=== Planning ===
The predecessor of the tower, the Okhta Center, was originally planned to be more centrally located in the city center of St. Petersburg. As the historical center has been a World Heritage Site since 1990, the World Heritage Committee opposed the construction of the 400-meter tower as it would affect the cityscape of historic Saint Petersburg. In December 2006 UNESCO World Heritage Centre Director Francesco Bandarin reminded Russia about its obligations to preserve it and expressed concern over the project. In 2007, the World Monuments Fund placed the historic skyline of St. Petersburg on its 2008 Watch List of 100 Most Endangered Sites due to the potential construction of the building. Due to this sizeable backlash on the original proposition, the Okhta Center, which had been planned by Gazprom to be in front of Smolny Cathedral, was moved to Lakhta. Plans for a new metro station in the area were announced in March 2012, the station was originally included in the 1980 city development plan of Leningrad, but had not been built.

The permit for construction of the first stage of Lakhta Center, which included the skyscraper and stylobate, was obtained on 17 August 2012.

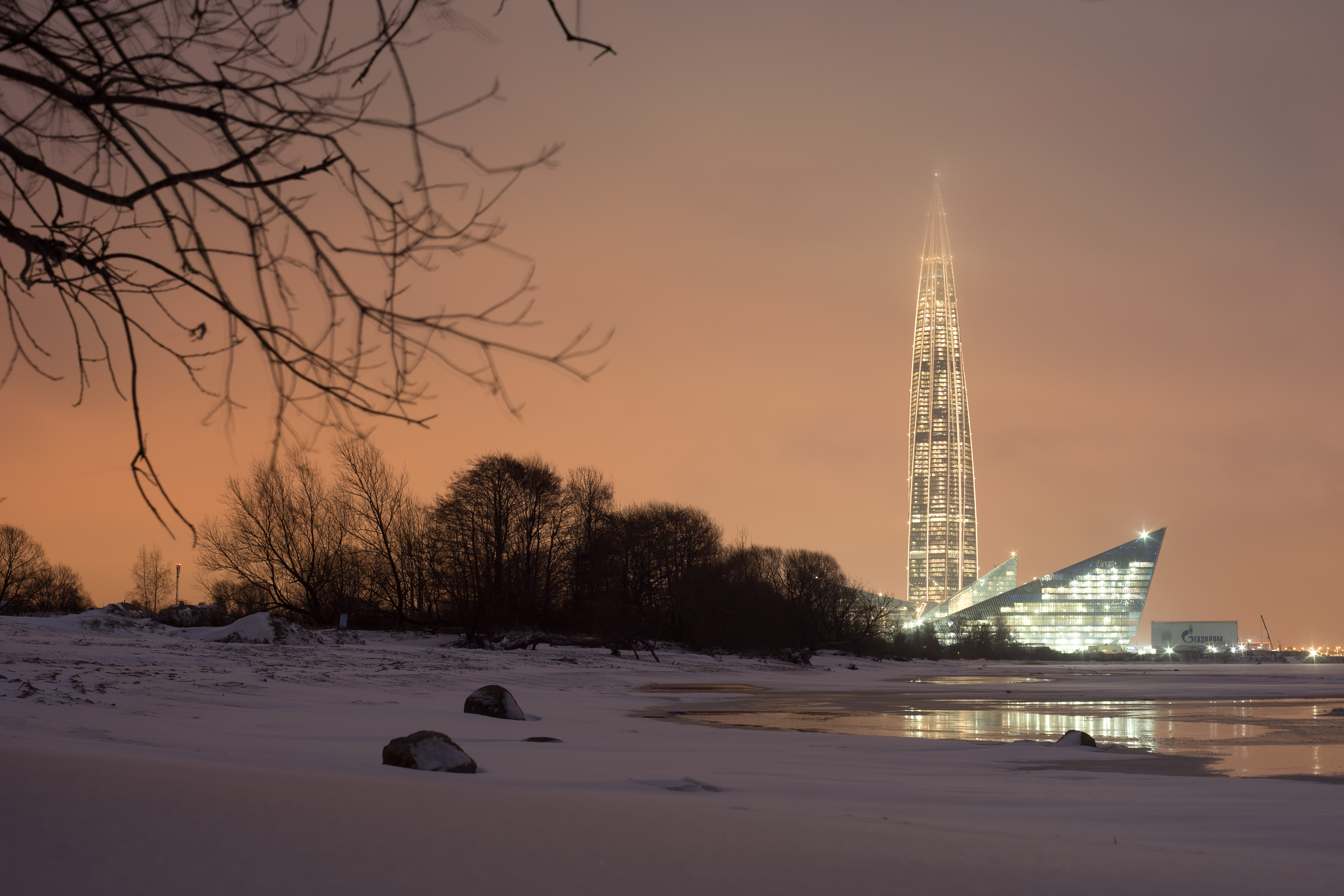
The Lakhta Center lit at dusk

=== Construction ===
Project management is being done by AECOM. German company Josef Gartner was in charge of the glazing of the skyscraper.

Zero cycle works started on 30 October 2012. The main contractor for the construction of Lakhta Center, Rönesans Holding, was selected on 22 April 2014.

==== Construction schedule ====
- March 2013 – zero cycle works are in progress. Piles are being installed. According to the schedule of construction a diaphragm wall is to be completed by the end of April while piling works will continue until 15 August 2013.
- April 2014 – construction of the skyscraper's foundation pit is complete.
- June 2014 – piling is completed. 264 piles were mounted for the tower of Lakhta Center, 848 piles were mounted for the mixed-use building and entrance arch and 968 piles were mounted for the stylobate (underground parking). All in all 2080 piles were dug in.
- February and March 2015 – the pouring of the bottom slab of the skyscraper's box shaped foundation is over. 19,624 cubic meters of concrete were cast in the foundation.
- September 2015 – all works below zero elevation are finished. The construction of the first floors of the tower core is underway.
- April 2017 – height exceeds 300 metres (980 ft), making Lakhta Center a supertall building (international classification).
- May 2017 – the skyscraper reached a height of 327 metres (1,073 ft), making it the tallest structure in St. Petersburg.
- 5 October 2017 – Lakhta center became the tallest building in Europe as it reached a height of 374 metres (1,227 ft).
- 29 January 2018 – the height of the tower is 462 metres (1,516 ft) and the assembly of the spire structure is complete.

== Other buildings ==
In addition to the tower, the complex contains multiple other buildings. The multi-functional building (MFZ) consists of two buildings, North and South, which are united by a common foundation, stylobate and roof. The building resembles a boomerang. It has a variable number of storeys with a height difference from 7 to 17 floors, with the peak height being a little more than 80 meters. The structure is approximately 300 meters long. The complex also has a third building, which consists of two separate wings connected by a courtyard. The MFZ contains a planetarium, which has a holding capacity of 140 people.

== Design ==
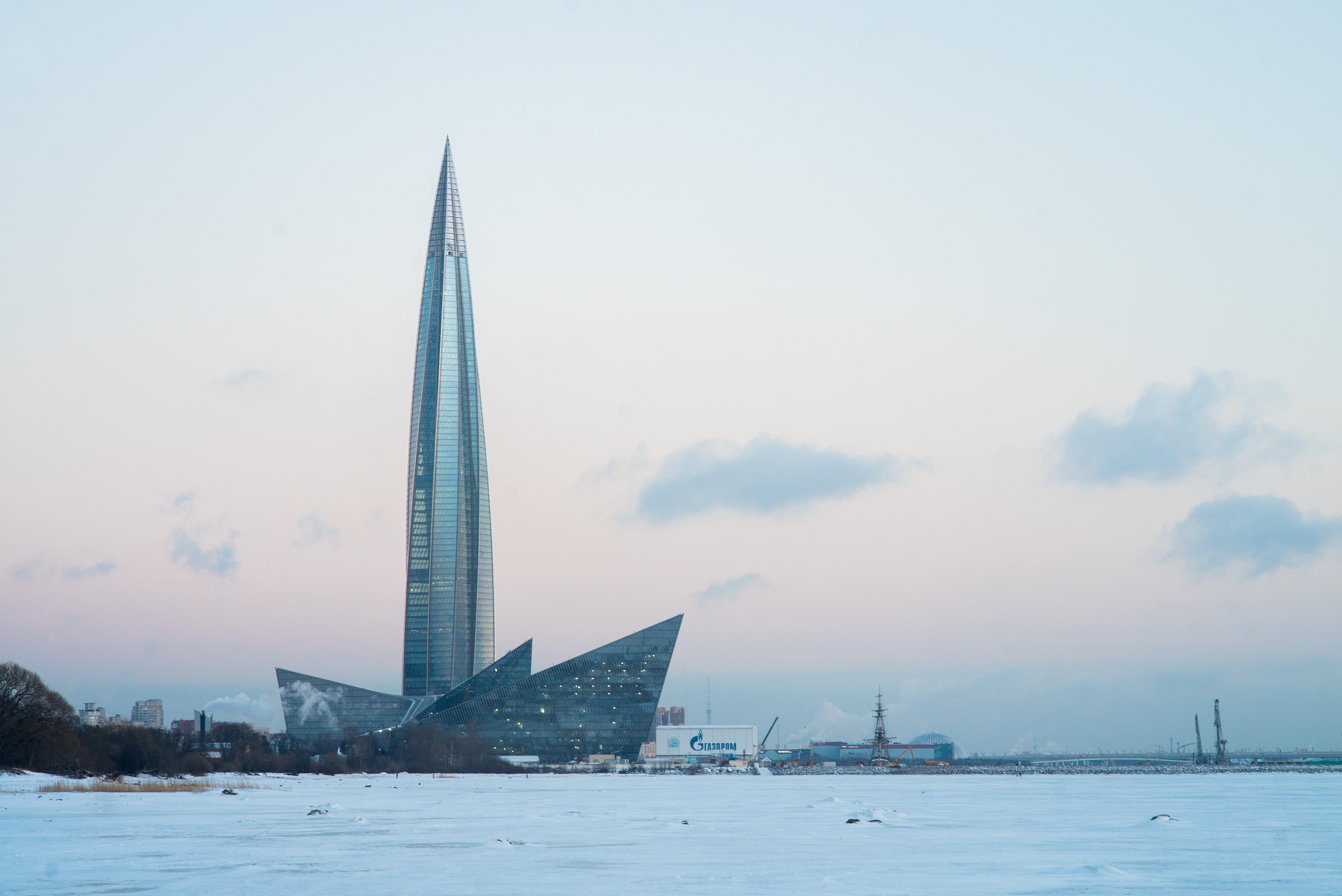
The Lakhta Centre seen from the shore of the Neva Bay in Olgino

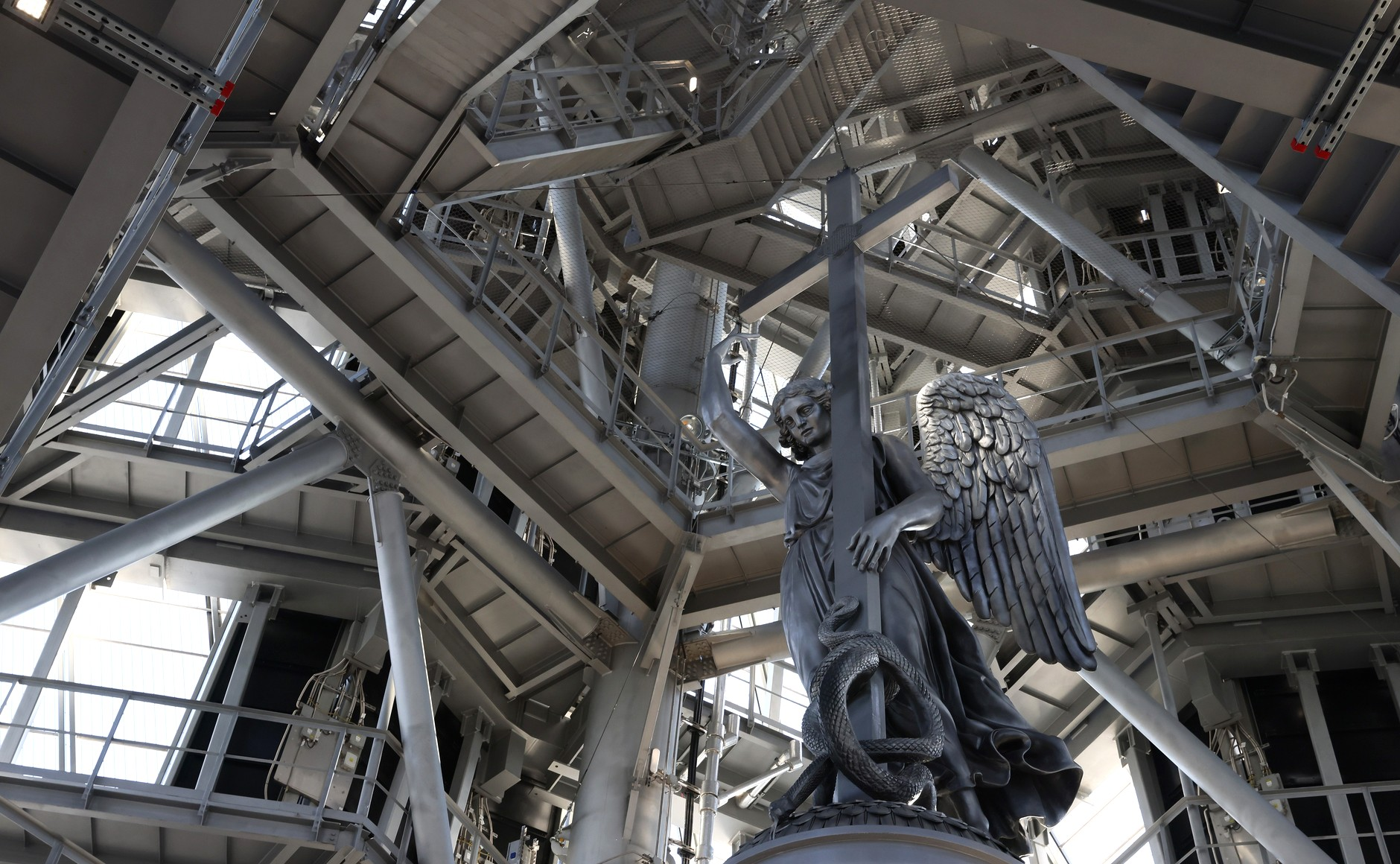
Sculpture the "Guardian Angel of St. Petersburg" on the 88th floor of the Lakhta Centre, a replica of the angel on top of the Alexander Column in Saint Petersburg

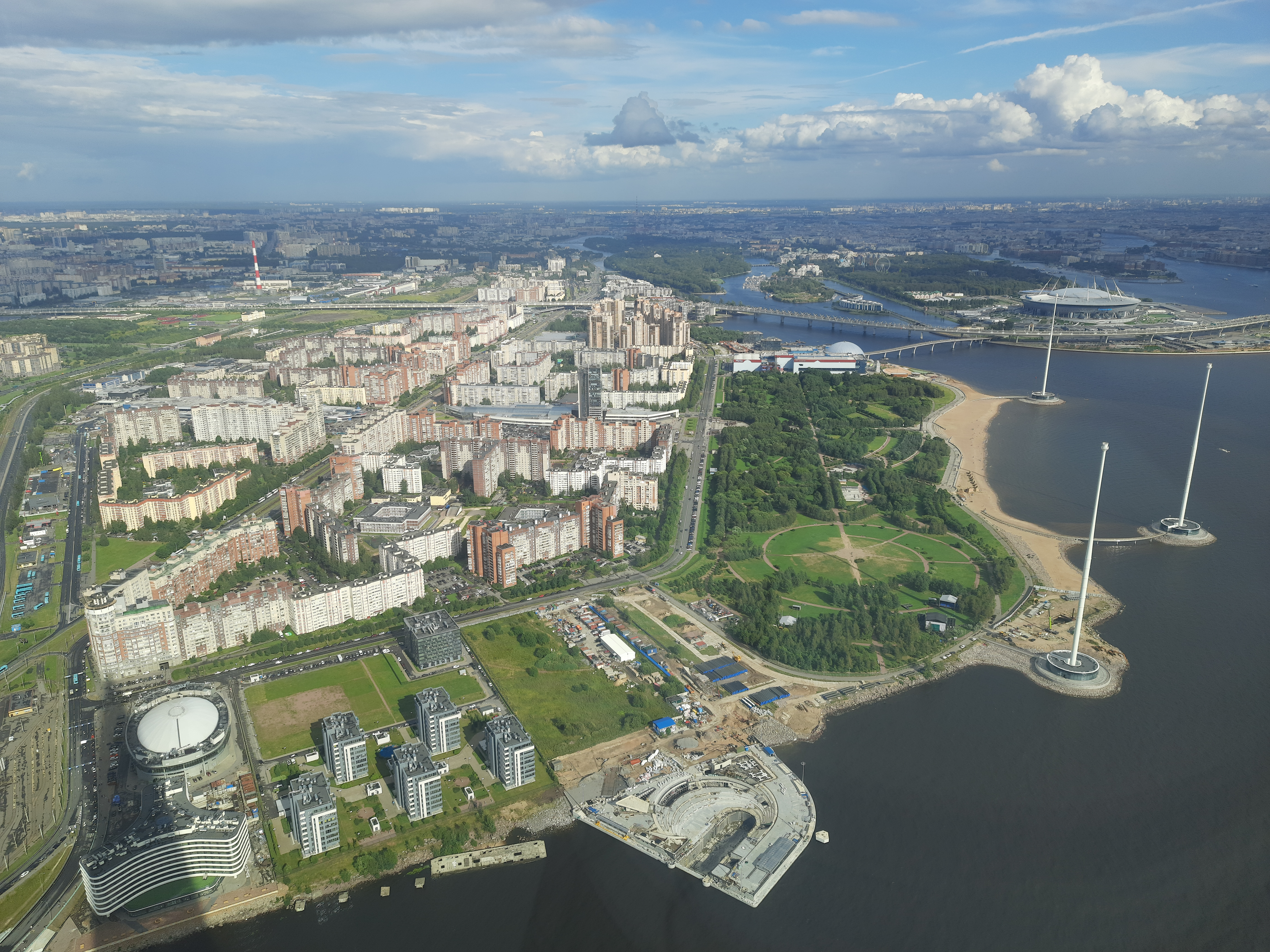
View from the Lakhta Centre observation deck

=== Facilities ===
The Lakhta Centre contains offices, a co-working center, a sports center, a children's science center, and a conference center. The project includes 1,500 square metres (16,000 sq ft) of indoor exhibition space. Part of the open area will be used to demonstrate art, installations and sculptures. There is a public observation deck at the top of the skyscraper at a height of 357 metres (1,171 ft).

There are high-speed elevators.

=== Environmental technologies ===
The design of the tower contains several green and energy-saving technologies, which earned it a LEED Platinum certificate. Excess heat generated by technical equipment is used to heat the premises. The skyscraper also uses equipment with reduced noise levels along with noise suppressors, sound-proof curtain walls and floating floors.

Due to the peculiarities of the highly humid and windy climate in the North Western region of Russia, the possibility of icing up of buildings is relatively high. In order to prevent complete icing up of the tower's spire, engineers changed glassing to metal gauze. Glass at high floors will be heated to prevent ice accumulation, ensuring good visibility.

In order to provide Lakhta Center and adjoining areas with electricity without imposing any extra burden on existing infrastructure, a new standalone power substation will be constructed.

=== Transportation development ===
Two traffic circles are to be built near Lakhta Center, which will become part of the М32А highway in the future. A light rail service from Finland Railway Station and a new tram line from Primorskaya underground station will be built to serve Lakhta Center. Plans are ongoing to build a new underground station with the working title of "Lakhta". Bicycle lanes near Lakhta Center with 90 parking places for bicycles are also planned.

== Reception ==
Lakhta Center received the Emporis Skyscraper Awards' "Skyscraper of the Year"-award in 2020. On 20 May 2021, the skyscraper won the facade engineering category award at the CTBUH Awards. The building also received 2 other Awards of Excellence that year: the structural engineering and geotechnical engineering awards. In October 2021, IFC Lakhta Center won the Grand Prix of Russia's largest engineering and architectural award 100 + Awards.

== Future developments ==
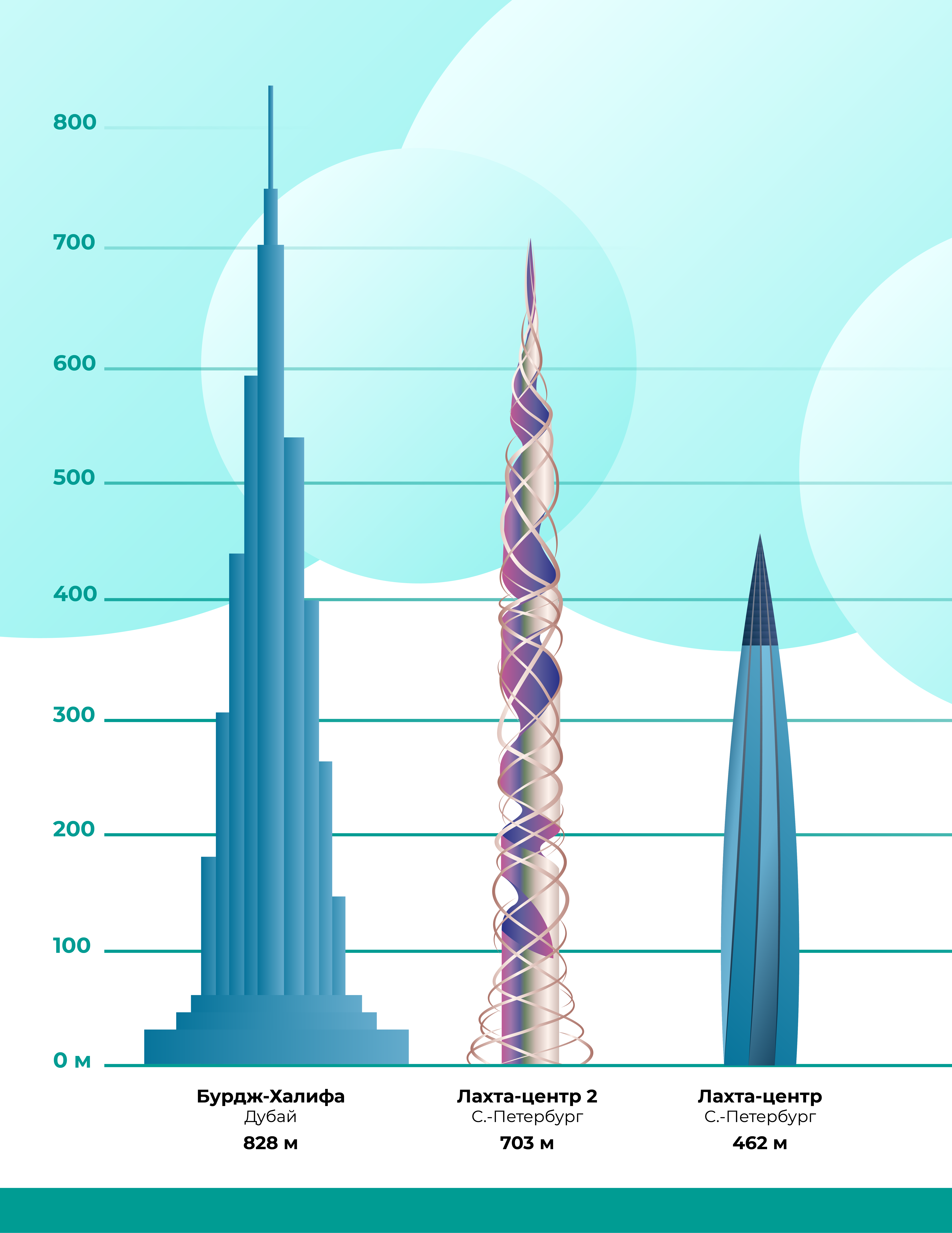
Lakhta Centre II (centre) as compared with Burj Khalifa and Lakhta Centre

=== Lakhta Center II ===
In May 2021 plans were announced for a second building to be built next to Lakhta Centre called Lakhta Centre II. If built, Lakhta Centre II would rise 703 metres (2,306 ft) and be 150 floors. It would also be the second tallest building in the world along with the tallest twisted building and the first megatall building outside Asia. As of 2023, a small yacht club has been demolished on the site of Lakhta Centre II and construction was rumoured to begin in 2024.

=== Lakhta Center III ===
In December 2021 further plans were revealed for Lakhta Centre III. As planned, Lakhta Centre III would rise 555 metres (1,821 ft). No major news for Lakhta Centre III has been released since its initial announcement. If built, Lakhta Centre III would be the second tallest building in Europe behind Lakhta Centre II, assuming Lakhta Centre II is completed before the third tower.

== See also ==
- List of tallest buildings in Russia
- List of tallest buildings in Europe
- List of twisted buildings

Records
Preceded by Federation Tower (East Tower)	Europe's tallest building 2017–present	Succeeded by Incumbent
Preceded by Federation Tower (East Tower)	Russia's tallest building 2017–present	Succeeded by Incumbent
Preceded by Leader Tower	Tallest building in Saint Petersburg; 2017–present	Succeeded by Incumbent
