= Avaza Power Plant =

Gas-fired power plant in Awaza, Türkmenbaşy, Balkan, Turkmenistan

- Country: Turkmenistan
- Location: Awaza, Türkmenbaşy, Balkan
- Coordinates: 40°00′41.2″N 52°50′45.9″E
- Status: Operational
- Construction began: May 2008
- Commission date: 2010

Thermal power station
- Primary fuel: Natural gas

Power generation
- Nameplate capacity: 254 MW

The Avaza Power Plant is a gas-fired power plant in Awaza, Türkmenbaşy, Balkan Region, Turkmenistan

== History ==
The construction of the power plant started in May 2008. It was then commissioned in 2010.

== Technical specifications ==
The power plant has an installed generation capacity of 254 MW from two 127 MW generation units.

== See also ==
- Energy in Turkmenistan
