= Ashgabat Power Plant =

Gas-fired power plant in Ahal, Turkmenistan

- Country: Turkmenistan
- Location: Ahal
- Coordinates: 37°49′42.6″N 58°23′02.8″E
- Status: Operational
- Construction began: December 2004
- Commission date: February 2006

Thermal power station
- Primary fuel: Natural gas

Power generation
- Nameplate capacity: 254 MW

The Ashgabat Power Plant is a gas-fired power plant in Ahal Region, Turkmenistan

== History ==
The construction of the power plant started in December 2004. It was then commissioned in February 2006.

== Technical specifications ==
The power plant consists of two 127 MW of generation units.

== See also ==
- Energy in Turkmenistan
