= Corruption in Turkmenistan =

Corruption in Turkmenistan is a widespread issue, with Turkmenistan being perceived as having the 16th most corrupt public sector by the 2025 Corruption Perceptions Index.

In Transparency International's 2025 Corruption Perceptions Index, which scored 182 countries on a scale from 0 ("highly corrupt") to 100 ("very clean"), Turkmenistan scored 17. When ranked by score, Turkmenistan ranked 167th among the 182 countries in the Index, where the country ranked first is perceived to have the most honest public sector. For comparison with regional scores, the best score among Eastern European and Central Asian countries (Note: Albania, Armenia, Azerbaijan, Belarus, Bosnia and Herzegovina, Georgia, Kazakhstan, Kosovo, Kyrgyzstan, Moldova, Montenegro, North Macedonia, Russia, Serbia, Tajikistan, Turkey, Turkmenistan, Ukraine, and Uzbekistan) was 50, the average score was 34 and the worst score was Turkmenistan's 17. For comparison with worldwide scores, the best score was 89 (ranked 1), the average score was 42, and the worst score was 9 (ranked 181, in a two-way tie).

According to an August 2015 statement by the U.S. Embassy in Turkmenistan, corruption is "widespread in both public and private sectors" in the country. "There are no standards-setting consortia or organizations besides Turkmen State Standards and the licensing agency. There is no independent body for filing complaints. Financial disclosure requirements are neither transparent nor consistent with international norms. Government enterprises are not required to publicize financial statements, even to foreign partners. Financial audits are often conducted by local auditors, not internationally recognized firms."

Turkmenistan's government, the U.S. Embassy states, "strictly controls foreign exchange flows, and the conversion of excess amounts of the local currency, the manat, remains problematic. ... While Turkmenistan has undertaken some initiatives to improve Intellectual Property Rights (IPR) protection, including the creation of the State Agency for Intellectual Property and the signing of some WIPO (World Intellectual Property Organization) conventions, it has not adopted comprehensive administrative and civil procedures to improve the enforcement of IPR." Moreover, "the country's regulatory system is not implemented transparently, and the government has influence over courts' decision-making processes." Owing to these and other problems, Turkmenistan has attracted little investment from American firms.

== Background ==
It originated as part of the Corruption in the Soviet Union.

All of the countries that were once part of the USSR face special challenges when it comes to corruption. According to the American Security Project, corruption is the foremost factor inhibiting these nations from developing along "liberal-democratic lines". Corruption prevents many citizens of these countries from pursuing any economic development and growth in their nations, all while inhibiting foreign investment.

Turkmenistan is part of the Central Asian region, an area of former Soviet republics in which levels of corruption are unusually high even for post-Soviet states. According to the Regional Anti-Corruption Initiative, Turkmenistan "lies in a virtual hotbed of corrupt states". Central Asia has the highest perceived corruption of any of the post-Soviet regions. From best to worst, those regions are: the Baltics, the Caucasus, Eastern Europe, Russia, and Central Asia. The level of perceived corruption seems to rise as one travels from West to East, "with the major deviation being that the Caucasus are perceived as less corrupt than Eastern Europe".

According to an analysis of the 2014 Corruption Perceptions Index, Estonia is viewed as the least corrupt post-Soviet state and Turkmenistan the most corrupt. Two Central Asian countries, Turkmenistan and Uzbekistan, were dubbed "Worst of the Worst" by Freedom House in 2015. Only seven other countries around the world fell into that category.

"Corruption in Post-Soviet Central Asia is something very familiar to people living in the region", states one source. "Without bribing, one is destined to see their case be delayed for a long time, very often beyond time limits defined by laws." Another source affirms that in Central Asia, "you can buy everything, not only standard products in plenty of recently opened supermarkets, but also unique civil documents, university diplomas, certifications, tanks, combat aircraft and other useful things." The source describes corruption as "pervasive", stating that government employees "are dependent on additional 'little money' because of their low monthly incomes", while "university rectors oversee the sale of diplomas and entrance exams tests as it is the only source to finance school."

At the lower levels of Central Asian society, "corruption is a way of life, and the higher up you go, the bigger the theft gets. It sadly appears that the corruption tries to monopolize the mechanism of market competition and the forms of it become more sophisticated... Half-baked, poorly designed, inadequately implemented market reforms boost corruption." One source sums the situation up as follows: "Be it application for a new passport, or registration at a new place of living, or even finding a daycare for your kid — bribing is the easiest way to get it all done faster and without a hassle".

"The high level of corruption in Central Asian States," explains one source, "can be attributed to the low wages of civil servants, the many opportunities for corruption during the last decade, historical roots and the lack of political will in implementing anticorruption measures." Two "bright spots" are that Central Asia's "perceived corruption is decreasing over time and its levels of illicit financial flows (IFFs) have been fairly low." Yet as the region continues to experience economic growth, without standards of accountability, elites will have access to illicit enrichment from enlarging natural resource industries.

According to a January 2014 report by the European Court of Auditors (ECA), "local corruption and a lack of cooperation from governments" are "the main driving factors behind the EU's development aid failures in Central Asia." The court criticized how "the European Commission's External Action Service (EEAS) managed development assistance in Central Asian countries between 2007 and 2012." The ECA report stated that the EEAS "provided assistance to a larger number of sectors than is consistent with best practice."

In a September 2015 article, Matthew Crosston suggested that corruption "is arguably more important in regions of the world currently undergoing in one form or another democratic transition and entrance into the global market economy", such as the Caspian littoral nations.

Turkmenistan has routinely had the worst corruption statistics in the region. The country is "highly corrupt and vulnerable to tomfoolery. ... Misuse of the state's revenues have driven many investors away and led to high levels of corruption." While the region "averages only 13% in terms of controlling corruption governmentally", Turkmenistan's score is only 2%; while the region's average score for "Rule of Law" score is 25%, Turkmenistan scores only 4%; while the region scores a 13% average for "Voice and Accountability", Turkmenistan scores what one website characterizes as a "laughable" 1%.

One source compares Turkmenistan to its neighbor Kazakhstan. Corruption is rampant in both countries, but while Kazakhstan has "a free private sector and the emerging middle class which creates jobs", Turkmenistan has a stagnant economy in which the "only tangible source of jobs is a gas agreement with China". Also, while the Kazakh and Uzbek media report on the corruption of those countries' rulers, in Turkmenistan the President's family and their business activities, corrupt or otherwise, are kept "out of the focus of public attention". Another source states that when it comes to corruption, "both Uzbekistan and Turkmenistan are getting worse year after year."

Turkmenistan was named by World Bank Vice President Johannes Linn in 2000 as "the only former Soviet republic where loans have been halted because of corruption allegations". Five Western firms were "banned from work on any World Bank projects" in Turkmenistan owing to "alleged fraud and corruption – including bribe payments to Turkmen authorities in an attempt to win contracts for Bank-funded projects".

== Government ==
=== President's power ===
Turkmenistan is widely viewed as one of the most repressive regimes on earth. Both its first president, Saparmurat Niyazov, who died in 2006, and his successor, Gurbanguly Berdimuhamedow, have exercised absolute power. The parliament is a rubber stamp, the regime is packed with Berdimuhamedow relatives, most regime opponents are based abroad, and most of those who are not abroad are in prison. It is Berdimuhamedow himself who selects foreign companies for major contracts. "Most of the foreign investment," said one source, "is governed by project-specific presidential decrees, which can grant privileges not provided by legislation."

Berdimuhamedow "has unquestioned authority over all decisions, and thus has the ability to funnel out money to finance luxurious urban developments and grand personal lifestyles". Berdimuhamedow's nephews, notably his sister Anabat's son, are also reportedly major players in the business sector. Indeed, an October 2011 Reuters report, citing leaked diplomatic cables, described Berdimuhamedow as "a vain liar accused of corruption on a vast scale" and as "a control freak who personally signs off minutiae such as work rotas for leading doctors in the capital".

Berdimuhamedow and his associates are believed to have diverted government funds into private bank accounts, and the late President Niyazov is thought to have done the same thing. Relatives of the president reportedly maintain prominent positions in key industries. It is said that the nation's elites have cultivated power by enacting a patronage system to ensure loyal persons rise up in the ranks. The entire economy is controlled by a "limited number of patronage networks commanded by Berdimuhamedow", each with its own sphere of influence. This arrangement has spawned a "culture of bribery, nepotism, and embezzlement", with bribe-taking "particularly prevalent among customs, licensing, and social service agencies".

As of 2013, Tom Mayne of Global Witness believed that Turkmenistan, under Berdimuhamedow, was "even more corrupt than under Niyazov's leadership". While Niyazov generally avoided regional nepotism and favoritism, Berdimuhamedow is said to frequently have done the opposite. The best way for foreign firms to enter the Turkmen market, according to Freedom House, is to forge "a personal relationship with the president or, alternatively, working through established foreign businessmen or high-ranking foreign officials". During Berdimuhamedow's first three years in power, "the price of introductions to him" rose "by 10 to 15 percent, well above inflation rates".

The Turkmen system gives the President total control over the revenues from the sale of hydrocarbons, which is the nation's main income source. The government uses these funds "to finance pervasive security services and vanity construction projects as well as to secure the support of patronage networks". Freedom House describes Berdimuhamedow as presiding over a system that allows him to legally appropriate oil profits and allocate them for personal use or physical assets for the state.

A 2009 report quoted a US diplomat as stating that power energy companies are known to present "small gifts" to officials in order to arrange appointments with Berdimuhamedow and other top-level figures. The same diplomat maintained that Itera, a Russian gas holding company, gave the President a $60 million yacht named Galkenysh in order to "speed up the conclusion" of a contract involving gas works on the Caspian Sea. During Berdimuhamedow's first three years in power, "the price of introductions to him has risen by 10 to 15 percent, well above inflation rates."

=== Tribal preferences ===
The late president Saparmurad Niyazov "reintroduced genealogical descent as a criterion for public sector employment", arguing that the country should look to "the experience of our ancestors, who chose their leaders, military commanders, and judges from among the worthiest compatriots with high moral standards".

=== Elections ===
Elections are rigged. Although the December 2013 Parliamentary elections were said to be Turkmenistan's first multiparty elections, they were "fundamentally non-competitive, as all candidates were pro-government and previously vetted by government leadership". In 2016, Berdimuhamedow was re-elected to his second term with 97% of the vote.

=== Lack of transparency ===
"To try and hide the corruption" that is rampant in Turkmenistan, states one source, "the state does not publish reports on economic figures or the national budget." Freedom House states that there is "a notable lack of transparency" in Turkmenistan "with regard to economic figures, including government income, spending, and extra-budgetary accounts". The nation's budget "is not published in full, and the figures that are made public are often incorrect, having been altered to give a false impression of economic growth". According to a report from the US Embassy, Turkmenistan has no mechanisms in place to enforce transparency or accountability among state-run enterprises.

=== Lower-level corruption ===
In addition to corruption by high-level government officials who take massive bribes in exchange for awarding contracts to foreign firms, Turkmenistan is riddled with "household corruption", meaning that everyday necessities, like education and medicine, require bribes. Bribery is so commonplace that citizens are generally oblivious to its presence or significance. Bribery is so pervasive in Turkmenistan, according to a 2010 leaked US diplomatic cable, that "the public expects to pay bribes during almost any interaction with the government." The cable goes on to list the costs of a bribe for traffic offenses: running a red light, $50; drunk driving $150–220; speeding tickets are forgotten for as little as $5–30.

Turkmen citizens have to pay bribes to get into hospitals, to get their children into "more prestigious" schools and universities, to record false lower sales prices when registering purchase of property, to obtain licenses for businesses. "Almost 70% of driving licenses were simply bought for the price of US$50–70." Business people say that "their high costs are due to the payoffs they have to make to government officials for sanctions, bank loans, and permits." Also, "the paternalistic role of government in organizing and subsidizing preferred industries leads to direct social benefit and creates avenues for rent-seeking and bribe-taking. Privileges are distributed in the form of special interest legislation, tariff protection, price supports. The resulting patronage allows the state to be captured by narrow, private interest group."

Under Berdimuhamedow, this kind of lower-level corruption is reportedly even more widespread than under Niyazov, because when Niyazov was in charge, according to Michael Laubsch of the Eurasian Transition Group, Soviet institutions remained in place, leaving little room for this kind of activity. However, with privatization, more opportunities arise for officials to take advantage.

== Corruption in business ==
=== Foreign investment ===
In Turkmenistan, according to the US Embassy in the country, developing a rapport with the government is a must to do business. US firms identify prevalent corruption, most notably rent-seeking as the greatest barrier to investment in Turkmenistan. Such corruption "is most pervasive in the areas of government procurement, the awarding of licenses and customs". The Turkmen regime, states the U.S. Embassy, is highly selective when choosing investment partners, making it almost impossible to do business successfully without a connection with the government.

Tom Mayne of Global Witness warns that foreign companies which decide to do business in Turkmenistan should realize that they are "doing business with an irrational government prone to mood swings" and that when a contract is being finalized, the Turkmen government "can urge them to work in cooperation with unknown, unreliable partners since it is beneficial for the authorities for some reason". Such foreign companies, moreover, will be compelled to engage in activities that violate "US or UK legislation combating corruption".

Privatization in the country has been largely shrouded, with bidding processes for public contracts occurring often behind closed doors. In addition, it is said that to even gain access to the bidding process, one must first receive approval from a state agency. Another important factor is that all land in the country is under the government's ownership. No business, domestic or foreign, can receive long-term leases for non-agricultural use of land. The president maintains supreme power to grant licenses for non-agricultural purposes.

Although the Turkmen government has sought "to introduce an element of competition for state contracts by announcing international tenders for some projects", contracts are still often awarded on political, not economic, grounds, and the process "is often badly managed and nontransparent". One U.S. firm "was told that it had won a tender and began investing in the project's design, only to be informed that the government was considering other options. The project ultimately was awarded by the government to a new company at twice the American company's bid."

A Law on Tenders that went into effect on 1 July 2015, "seeks to develop competition among bidders, ensure transparency and effective implementation of tender procedures, and compliance with international standards", but it is so far unclear whether the law has resulted in greater honesty and transparency. Also, any contract with a foreign firm must be approved by the State Commodity and Raw Materials Exchange, the Central Bank, the Supreme Control Chamber, and the Cabinet of Ministers. This process "is not transparent and is often politically driven", nor is there any assurance that "information provided by companies to the Government of Turkmenistan will be kept confidential."

U.S. diplomatic cables made public by Wikileaks called the construction industry the most corrupt in the nation, noting contractors regularly inflate prices by as much as 30 percent to pay bribes. Foreign contractors are said to regularly make illicit payments to Turkmen officials.

=== Deutsche Bank charges ===
A March 2009 report by Global Witness criticized Deutsche Bank for enabling former President Saparmurat Niyazov to siphon billions of public funds to a personal bank account. Niyazov was accused of stashing up to $3 billion in state energy revenues from 1995 until his death in 2006. The report also stated that "Turkmenistan is the only country that Global Witness has ever come across where none of the natural resource wealth appeared to be making it onto the government's budget." Deutsche Bank declined to comment on whether other family members or government officials also have accounts.

=== Daimler case ===
In April 2010, the German and Russian subsidiaries of Daimler, which manufactures Mercedes-Benz and Smart cars, agreed to plead guilty to criminal charges and pay the U.S. Department of Justice a $185 million fine in exchange for the dismissal of a lawsuit against Daimler for violating "fair trade" rules. Meanwhile, the parent firm and its Chinese division agreed "to suspend prosecution for two years, as long as they comply with certain conditions". Daimler had been accused of "bribing foreign officials in at least 22 countries ... between 1998 and 2008, according to court papers released yesterday". Among those countries was Turkmenistan. Daimler and its distributor had attempted to enter the Turkmen market in 2000 by presenting a €300,000 armored car to "a high-ranking Turkmen official" and by arranging the publication of 10,000 copies in German of President Niyazov's "quasi-spiritual guidebook for the nation", The Ruhnama (Book of the Soul).

== Anti-corruption efforts ==
The US Embassy has noted that Turkmenistan has "no independent 'watchdog' organization ... that monitors corruption". The Ministry of Internal Affairs, the Ministry of National Security, and the General Prosecutor's Office are technically responsible for fighting corruption, and Berdimuhamedow has said that he will not tolerate corruption. But these are widely viewed as empty guarantees. In November 2000, according to one source, "officials from Turkmenistan's General Prosecutor's Office, the Parliament, several government ministries, the Tax Service and law-enforcement agencies took part in a two-day workshop ... focusing on the implementation of the UN Convention against Corruption. The OSCE Centre in Ashgabat organized the workshop with the United Nations Office on Drugs and Crime (UNODC), the Office of the Co-ordinator of OSCE Economic and Environmental Activities and Turkmenistan's Foreign Ministry to help Turkmenistan develop its legal framework for combating corruption. External participants discussed the main provisions of the Convention and experiences of implementing anti-corruption programmes from Kazakhstan, Latvia, Russia and Uzbekistan. Representatives from the OECD and the OSCE also presented their organizations' activities in the area of combating corruption."

In March 2005, Turkmenistan adopted the UN Anticorruption Convention. It is not, however, a member of the OECD Convention on Combatting Bribery of Foreign Public Officials in International Business Transactions. In January 2010, Turkmenistan established a Financial Intelligence Unit under the Ministry of Finance, purportedly to enhance efforts to fight money laundering and the financing of terrorism. On 1 January 2012, Turkmenistan's banks switched to International Financial Reporting Standards (IFRS). The country's government agencies transitioned to National Financial Reporting Standards (NFRS) in January 2014.

In October 2012, Berdimuhamedow "announced that Turkmenistan would join the Egmont Group, an international organization specializing in the exchange of best practices on AML/CFT. Turkmenistan's membership, he said, would demonstrate to the international community its commitment to combating money laundering and terrorism financing." As of August 2015, however, Turkmenistan had not yet joined the Egmont Group.

In March 2014, the Turkmen parliament passed an anti-corruption law that established "a legal and institutional framework to help identify cases of corruption". Under this law, certain categories of civil servants were forbidden for the first time "to engage in entrepreneurial activity, to open accounts in foreign banks, to accept gifts, contrary to the established order, to receive honorary and special titles, awards and other insignia of foreign states, international organizations and political parties. Civil servants also have to provide information about their income, expenses and assets as well as income, expenses and assets of their [spouses] and minor children." The US Embassy noted, however, that given the country's "weak legal institutions", it was "difficult to see how this law could be effectively enforced". Also, while Turkmenistan has anti-corruption laws, they are not generally enforced.

In September 2014, seven Turkmen government and law-enforcement officials took part in an OSCE-organized study visit in Riga. The purpose was for the visitors "to observe how anti-corruption and anti-money laundering mechanisms are implemented in practice" in Latvia.

At a 9 July 2015, cabinet meeting, Berdimuhamedow fired several high officials, including his economy and development minister, a deputy premier overseeing the economic and finance sector, and a deputy premier in charge of agriculture. The president accused them of involvement in bribery and also said they "had failed to assess the impact of the global crisis on Turkmenistan's economy". State television reported that "80 banking, tax and financial services workers" had been "charged with committing various crimes" in "recent times".

In 2019, the national chief of police, Minister of Internal Affairs Isgender Mulikov, was convicted and imprisoned for corruption. In 2020 the deputy prime minister for education and science, Pürli Agamyradow, was dismissed for failure to control bribery in education.

== See also ==
- International Anti-Corruption Academy
- Group of States Against Corruption
- International Anti-Corruption Day
- ISO 37001 Anti-bribery management systems
- United Nations Convention against Corruption
- OECD Anti-Bribery Convention
- Transparency International
