= The State Insurance Organization of Turkmenistan =

The State Insurance Organization of Turkmenistan (in Turkmen: Türkmenistanyň Döwlet Ätiýaçlandyryş Guramasy) is one of the largest insurance companies in Turkmenistan.

Founded on August 18, 1992, the State Insurance Organization carries out insurance and reinsurance activities in accordance with License No.1-5-33-1, issued by the Ministry of Finance of Turkmenistan. Its main objective is to strengthen the financial position of Turkmenistan, as well as to fully satisfy the needs of the population, and their business enterprises for insurance services. The company's current general manager is Amanbibi Amanmedova.

== History ==
The organization was established in August 1992 in order to carry out its insurance and reinsurance activities on the basis of license No. 1-5-33-1, issued by the Ministry of Finance of Turkmenistan. The main goal of the organization is to strengthen the financial position of Turkmenistan and fully meet the needs of the population and enterprises of the country in insurance services at the world level and on the most favorable conditions for customers.

== See also ==
- Insurance
