= South Caspian Basin =

Major sedimentary and hydrocarbon province in the Caspian Sea

- Location: Caspian Sea
- Country: Azerbaijan, Turkmenistan, Iran

Geology
- Basin type: Sedimentary basin
- Age: Mesozoic to Cenozoic

The South Caspian Basin (also referred to as the South Caspian oil and gas basin or South Caspian Province) is one of the deepest sedimentary basins in the world and a highly prolific petroleum province. Located in the southern sector of the Caspian Sea, the basin encompasses eastern Azerbaijan, western Turkmenistan, and northern Iran. It is characterized by an exceptional sedimentary accumulation reaching thicknesses of up to 20–25 kilometres (12.4–15.5 mi) and contains over 80 developed or prospective oil and gas fields, making it a critical engine of the regional energy economy.

== Geological setting ==
Unlike typical continental basins, the crust beneath the South Caspian Basin displays an oceanic-like structure. The continental "granitic" layer is entirely absent; instead, the crust consists of a highly attenuated "basaltic" crystalline basement (approximately 10–15 km thick) overlain by a massive sedimentary stratum.

The basin is bounded by significant orogenic systems: the Greater Caucasus and Talysh Mountains to the west, the Alborz mountains to the south, and the Kopet Dag to the east. It is separated from the Central Caspian by the Apsheron Sill (Apsheron-Pribalkhan fault zone), a prominent structural lineament running from the Absheron Peninsula to western Turkmenistan. Rapid tectonic subsidence coupled with heavy sedimentation from paleo-river networks—particularly the Volga and Kura drainage systems—led to the rapid accumulation of deltaic, lacustrine, and marine deposits during the Mesozoic and Cenozoic eras.

== Stratigraphy and petroleum systems ==
The petroleum geology of the South Caspian Basin is governed by the Oligocene–Miocene Maykop Group and Diatom formations, which serve as the principal organic-rich source rocks. Hydrocarbons generated within these deep source rocks migrated upward into thick Pliocene reservoir sandstones known as the "Productive Series" (PS) in Azerbaijan and the "Red Series" in Turkmenistan.

The stratigraphic sequence is dominated by alternating sandstones, siltstones, and mudstones deposited in deltaic and fluvial environments. Due to extremely rapid burial, the deep sedimentary layers have maintained a relatively low geothermal gradient, resulting in widespread overpressure and high-pressure, high-temperature (HPHT) reservoir dynamics at depths exceeding 5,000–7,000 metres.

== Mud volcanism ==
The South Caspian Basin features the highest concentration of mud volcanoes in the world, containing over 400 individual structures (approximately one-quarter of the global total). These mud volcanoes serve as natural hydrocarbon seeps and are directly linked to subsurface oil and gas accumulations. Expelled gases originate from deep source kitchens at depths of 7–15 km, providing empirical evidence of deep-seated hydrocarbon generation within the Maykop and Diatom formations. Major fields such as Lokbatan, Garadag, and Oil Rocks are spatially associated with active mud volcanism.

== Major hydrocarbon fields ==
The basin hosts several world-class hydrocarbon accumulations, which are segmented into onshore trends and offshore archipelagos:

- Azeri–Chirag–Gunashli (ACG): A mega-field complex situated on the Apsheron Sill, representing the cornerstone of Azerbaijan's offshore oil production since 1997.
- Shah Deniz gas field: One of the largest open-structure gas-condensate fields globally, supplying natural gas to Europe via the Southern Gas Corridor.
- Absheron gas field: A deepwater gas-condensate field currently under joint development by SOCAR and TotalEnergies.
- Umid gas field (Umid–Babek Block): A high-pressure unified hydrocarbon asset managed by the Umid Babek Operating Company (UBOC) under a Risk Service Agreement. It is notable for complex ultra-deep offshore appraisal drilling operations extending beyond 7,000 metres within the overpressured segments of the basin.
- Neft Daşları (Oil Rocks): Established in 1949, it is historically recognized as the world's first operational offshore oil platform.

== See also ==
- Geology of Azerbaijan
- Caspian Sea
- Southern Gas Corridor
