= Rönesans Holding =

Turkish contracting and investment company

- Founded: 1993
- Founder: Erman Ilıcak
- Headquarters: Turkey
- Revenue: 3.17 billion USD (2022)
- Operating income: 1.07 billion USD (2022)
- Net income: 913 million USD (2022)
- Total assets: 7.42 billion USD (2022)
- Website: ronesans.com

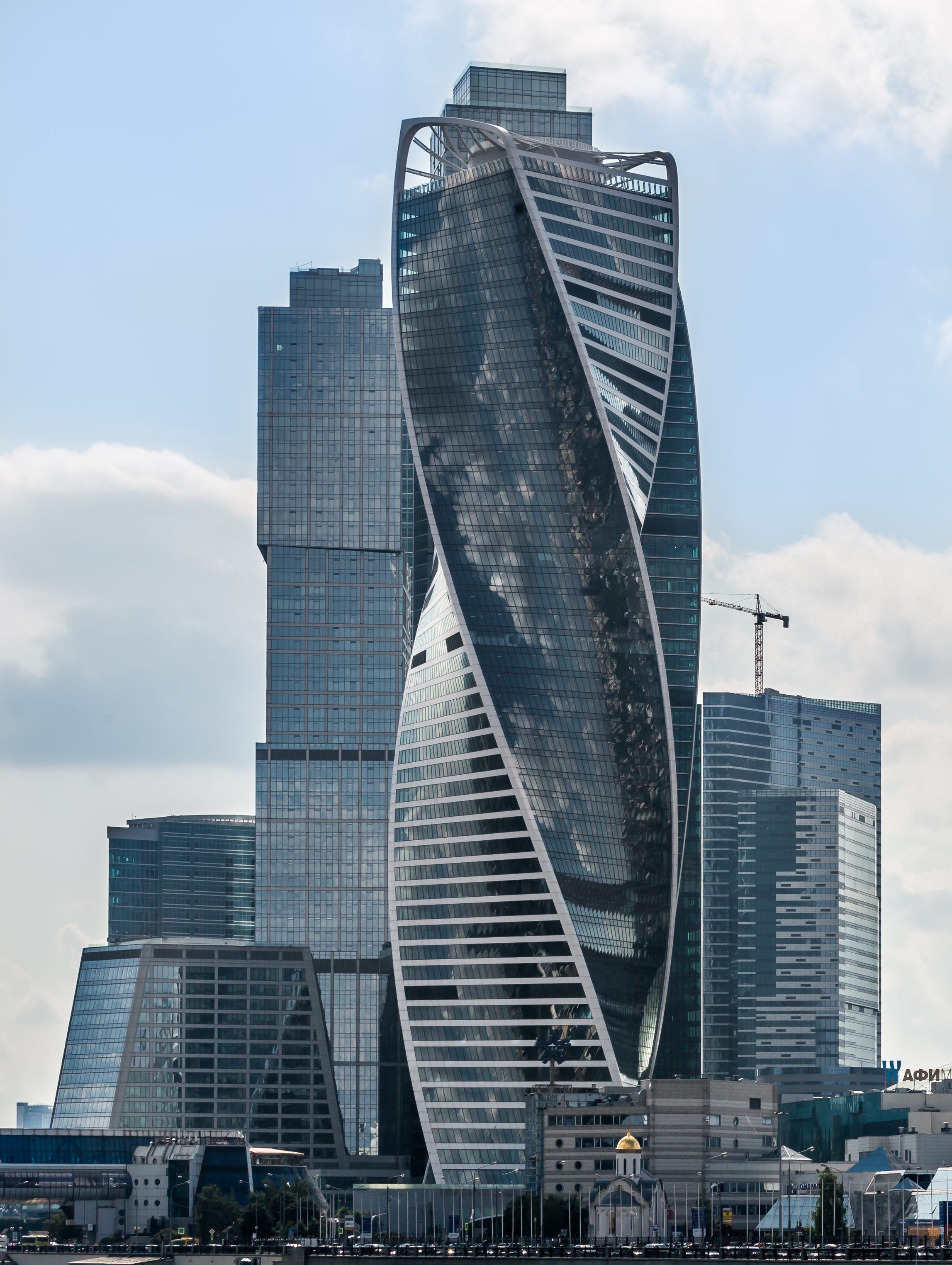
Evolution Tower in Moscow International Business Center is built by the company.

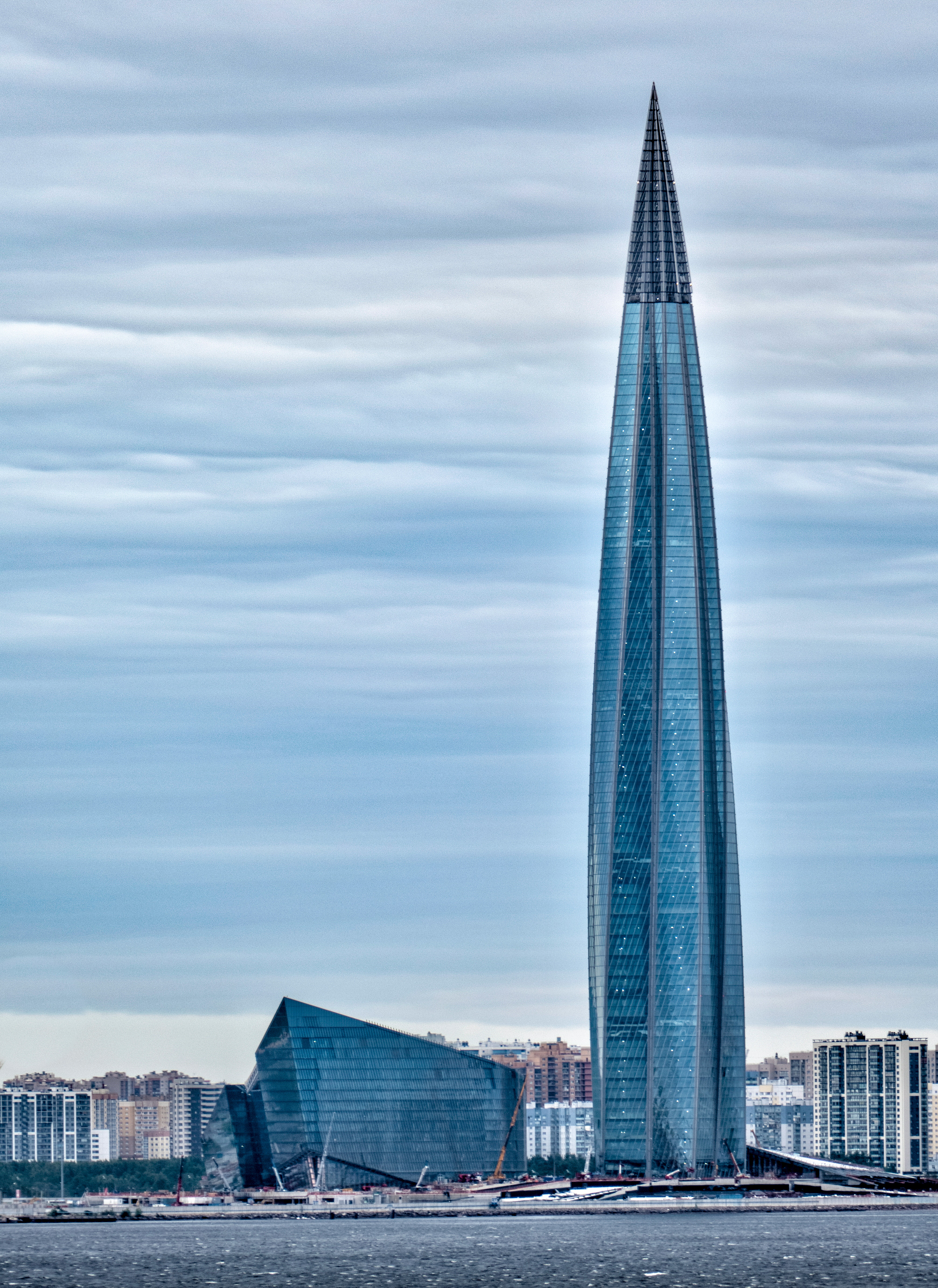
Lakhta Center, the tallest building in Europe, is built by the company.

Rönesans Holding is a Turkish contracting and investment company operating in construction, real estate development, energy, industrial facilities and health. The company operates in Asia, Europe, and Africa. It was founded in 1993 by Erman Ilıcak and has headquarters in Ankara, Turkey. Its main activities are construction, real estate investment and energy generation. İpek Ilıcak Kayaalp is the chair of the board.

Rönesans Holding builds shopping malls, offices, hotels, residences, composite structures, heavy industry plants, infrastructure plants, light production plants, factories, government buildings and energy plants as main contractor and investor. In some projects, it takes on the management of its building. According to ENR data, Rönesans Holding owns the world's 38th-largest construction company, Rönesans Construction.

== History ==
The company was founded by Erman Ilıcak. The company contracts as a construction company in 30 countries globally and is the 9th-largest contracting company in Europe.

== Group companies ==
Construction

- RC Rönesans İnşaat Taahüt A.Ş.
- Rönesans Endüstri Tesisleri A.Ş.
- Rönesans Türkmen İnşaat A.Ş.
- Rönesans Mea İnşaat A.Ş.
- Rönesans Altyapı Tesisleri A.Ş.
- Rönesans Rusya İnşaat A.Ş.
- Rönesans Medikal İnşaat A.Ş.
- Rönesans Teknik İnşaat A.Ş.
- Ballast Nedam

Real Estate

- Rönesans Emlak Geliştirme Holding A.Ş.
- Rönesans Sağlık Yatırım A.Ş.
- Rönesans Gayrimenkul Yatırım A.Ş.
- Desna Gayrimenkul Yatırım A.Ş.
- İstanbul SEAPORT

Energy

- Rönesans Enerji Üretim A.Ş
- Rönesans Elektrik Enerji Toptan Satış A.Ş

== See also ==
- Rönesans Education Foundation
