= Toyo Engineering Corporation =

Japanese engineering, procurement and construction company

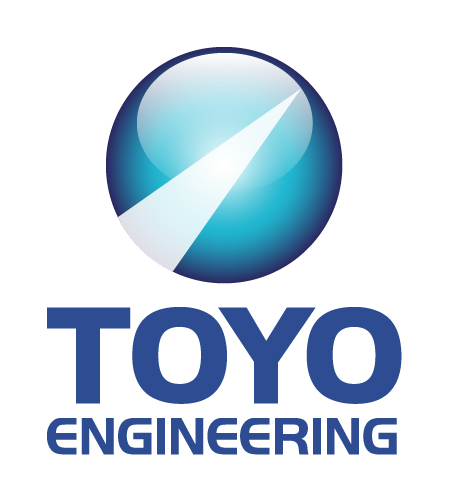
- Native name: 東洋エンジニアリング株式会社
- Company type: Public (KK)
- Traded as: TYO: 6330
- ISIN: JP3607800004
- Industry: Engineering; Construction services
- Founded: (May 1, 1961; 64 years ago)
- Headquarters: Shin-Marunouchi Building, Marunouchi, Chiyoda-ku; Narashino, Chiba, Japan
- Area served: Worldwide
- Key people: Masaaki Yamaguchi (Chairman); Haruo Nagamatsu (President)
- Services: Engineering and construction for industrial facilities
- Revenue: ▲JPY 431.9 billion (FY 2016) (US$3.89 billion) (FY 2016)
- Net income: ▼JPY 1.4 billion (FY 2016) (US$12.6 million) (FY 2016)
- Number of employees: 4,397 (consolidated as of March 31, 2016)
- Website: Official website

Toyo Engineering Corporation (東洋エンジニアリング株式会社, Tōyō Enjiniaringu Kabushiki-gaisha) is a Japanese engineering, procurement and construction company serving mainly the hydrocarbons (oil and natural gas) and petrochemical sectors worldwide.

It was established in 1961. Its various business include R&D collaboration, design, engineering, equipment procurement, construction, test operations and technical guidance in such areas as general chemicals, petrochemicals, oil refinement, natural gas, electric power, nuclear power, advanced production systems, distribution, medical facilities, biotechnology, environment at each manufacturing plant, procurement, development and sales of systems engineering and other software.

Most of its revenue comes from outside Japan; it has a particular presence in China, India, Indonesia, Iran and Russia. In the fiscal year ending March 31, 2008, it had sales of 215 billion yen, a net income of 4.45 billion yen, and about a thousand employees.

The Toyo Group, or Global Toyo, consists of Toyo together with 27 subsidiaries and 11 affiliates, with a total of 5500 employees; the central portion comprises about 3300 employees.

== History ==
- May 1961 (Showa 36): Toyo Engineering was established through the separation and independence of the engineering division of Toyo High-Pressure Industry (now Mitsui Chemicals). The company was founded with investments from Taisei Corporation, Mitsui & Co., Ltd., and Toyo High-Pressure Industry.
- 1962 (Showa 37): Entered into a business collaboration with the American company, Lumus.
- 1965 (Showa 40): Received its first order for an ethylene plant.
- November 1980 (Showa 55): Listed on the Tokyo Stock Exchange (TSE) Second Section.
- September 1982 (Showa 57): Upgraded to the First Section of the Tokyo Stock Exchange.
- 1987 (Showa 62): Established Technofrontier Corporation, which later became Tech Project Services Corporation.
- April 1999 (Heisei 11): The system integration business was spun off to form Toyo Business Engineering Corporation.
- May 2006 (Heisei 18): Mitsui & Co., Ltd. became the largest shareholder through a third-party allotment of shares.
- July 2012 (Heisei 24): On the occasion of the 50th anniversary of its founding in the previous year, the company refreshed its symbol mark.
