= Ministry of Energy (Turkmenistan) =

Government ministry of Turkmenistan

- Türkmenistanyñ energetika ministrligi

Agency overview
- Formed: 2012
- Jurisdiction: President of Turkmenistan
- Headquarters: Ashgabat, Turkmenistan
- Minister responsible: Charymurad Purchekov, Minister of Energy
- Website: Ministry of Energy

The Ministry of Energy of Turkmenistan (Turkmen: Türkmenistan energetika ministrligi) is a Cabinet Ministry in the Turkmenistan. Since 2015, the portfolio has been headed by Minister Charymurad Purchekov.

== History ==
According to the Decree of the President of Turkmenistan Gurbanguly Berdimuhamedov on July 7, 2012 "On creation of the Ministry of Energy of Turkmenistan" was the successor of the abolished department of the Ministry of Energy and Industry of Turkmenistan. By focusing on the power sector, the ministry will be able to deliver it more effective management and coordination. Before the agency faces the challenges of large-scale modernization of existing power generation capacity, the creation of new ones, to increase electricity export.

== Ministers ==
No	Name	Start	End
1	Murad Artykov	06.07.2012	10.01.2014
2	Geldy Saryev	10.01.2014	21.08.2015
3	Döwran Rejepow	21.08.2015	27.02.2017
4	Charymurad Purchekov	27.02.2017	Present
