= List of Minnesota companies =

Top companies in Minnesota according to revenues with state and U.S. rankings
State rank	Corporation	US rank
1	UnitedHealth Group	5
2	Target Corporation	30
3	Best Buy	66
4	3M	96
5	CHS Inc.	103
6	U.S. Bancorp	113
7	General Mills	169
8	C. H. Robinson	191
9	Land O'Lakes	219
10	Ecolab	237
11	Ameriprise Financial	253
12	Xcel Energy	272
13	Hormel Foods	317
14	Thrivent	369
15	Polaris Inc.	407
16	Securian Financial Group	421
17	Fastenal	479
18	Patterson Companies	491
19	APi Group	656
20	The Toro Company	687
21	H.B. Fuller	786
22	Donaldson Company	821
23	Federated Mutual; Insurance Company	897
24	Sleep Number	998
Source: 2021 Fortune 500

The following list of Minnesota companies includes notable companies that are, or once were, headquartered in Minnesota.

== Notable firms ==
This list includes notable companies with primary headquarters located in the state. The industry and sector follow the Industry Classification Benchmark taxonomy. Organizations which have ceased operations are included and noted as defunct.

Notable companies Status: P=Private, S=State; A=Active, D=Defunct
Name	Industry	Sector	Headquarters	Founded	Notes	Status	
3M	Conglomerate		Maplewood	1902	Industry, worker safety, healthcare, and consumer goods	P	A
Abdallah Candies	Consumer goods	Food products	Apple Valley	1909	Chocolatier and confectionery	P	A
Acorn Stores	Consumer services	Upscale women's clothing retailer	Minneapolis	1991	Defunct in 2008	P	D
American Crystal Sugar Company	Consumer goods	Sugar production	Moorhead	1899		P	A
Ameriprise Financial	Financial	Banks	Minneapolis	1894	Bank	P	A
Andersen Corporation	Industrials	Manufacturing	Bayport	1903	Manufactures windows and doors	P	A
Anytime Fitness	Consumer services	Health and fitness clubs	Woodbury	2002		P	A
Arctic Cat	Industrials	Snowmobiles & all-terrain vehicles	Thief River Falls	1960		P	A
ATS Medical	Healthcare	Developer and manufacturer of products for the cardiac surgery market	Minneapolis	1992		P	D
August Schell Brewing Company	Consumer goods	Craft brewery	New Ulm	1860		P	A
Aveda	Consumer goods	Cosmetics	Minneapolis	1978		P	A
Ballistic Recovery Systems	Industrials	Defense	Saint Paul	1980		P	A
Bellisio Foods	Consumer goods	Food products	Minneapolis	1918	Frozen food manufacturer	P	A
Bemidji Airlines	Consumer services	Airlines	Bemidji	1946	Domestic cargo flights, extensive charter, and air taxi services	P	A
Bemidji Woolen Mills	Consumer goods	Retail store & clothing manufacturer	Bemidji	1920		P	A
Best Buy	Consumer services	Consumer electronics	Richfield	1966		P	A
C. H. Robinson	Transportation	Logistics	Eden Prairie	1905		P	A
Cambria	Basic materials	Engineered quartz	Le Sueur	2000		P	A
Cameron's Coffee	Consumer goods	Food processing	Shakopee	1978	Acquired by Grupo Nutresa	P	A
Cargill	Conglomerate		Minnetonka	1865		P	A
Caribou Coffee	Consumer services	Restaurants & bars	Brooklyn Center	1992		P	A
Carlson	Conglomerate		Minnetonka	1938		P	A
Canterbury Park	Consumer services	Recreational services	Shakopee	1985	Horse race track	P	A
Challenger Tractor	Industrials	Agricultural machinery	Jackson	1986	Agricultural tractor brand, now part of AGCO	P	A
Champion Air	Transportation	Airlines	Bloomington	1995	Defunct in 2008	P	D
Chase Bliss Audio	Consumer services	Consumer electronics	Anoka	2013		P	A
Christopher & Banks	Consumer services	Women's clothing retailer	Plymouth	1956		P	A
CHS Inc.	Agriculture	Agricultural cooperative	Inver Grove Heights	1931	Wholesale agricultural products and fuel	P	A
Cirrus Aircraft	Industrials	Aerospace	Duluth	1984		P	A
CodeWeavers	Technology	Software	Saint Paul	1996		P	A
Compass Airlines	Transportation	Airlines	Fort Snelling	2006	Ceased operations in 2020	P	D
Control Data Corporation	Technology	Mainframe and supercomputer	Bloomington	1957		P	D
Cub	Consumer services	Food retailers & wholesalers	Stillwater	1968		P	A
Dairy Queen	Consumer services	Restaurants & bars	Bloomington	1940		P	A
Dakota, Minnesota and Eastern Railroad	Transportation	Railroad	Minneapolis	1986	Ceased operation in 2008	P	D
Dayforce	Technology	Software	Minneapolis	1992		P	A
Dayton's	Consumer services	Department store retailer	Minneapolis	1902		P	A
Deluxe Corporation	Financials	Checks & payment technology	Minneapolis	1915		P	A
Department 56	Industrials	Manufacturer	Eden Prairie	1976	Christmas collectibles & ornaments	P	A
Digi International	Technology	Networking	Hopkins	1985		P	A
DigiKey	Technology	Electronic components	Thief River Falls	1972		P	A
Digital River	Financials	E-commerce	Minnetonka	1994		P	A
Donaldson Company	Industrials	Filtration	Bloomington	1915		P	A
Duluth Pack	Consumer goods	Bags & accessories	Duluth	1882		P	A
Ecolab	Industrials	Water treatment	Saint Paul	1923		P	A
Edina Realty	Real estate		Edina	1955		P	A
Endeavor Air	Transportation	Airlines	Minneapolis	1985		P	A
Entrust	Financials	Digital security and credential issuance	Shakopee	1994		P	A
Famous Dave's	Consumer services	Restaurant & bars	Minnetonka	1994		P	A
Fantasy Flight Games	Consumer goods	Board game developer	Roseville	1995		P	A
Faribault Woolen Mill Company	Consumer goods	Textiles	Faribault	1865		P	A
Farley's & Sathers Candy Company	Consumer goods	Snack food	Roseville	2002		P	D
Geek Squad	Consumer services	Consumer device & appliance repair	Richfield	1994		P	A
General Mills	Consumer goods	Consumer foods	Golden Valley	1856		P	A
Graco	Industrial	Fluid-handling systems and products	Minneapolis	1926		P	A
Great Clips	Consumer services	Hair salon	Bloomington	1982		P	A
Griswold Signal Company	Industrials	Engineering	Minneapolis	1923	Defunct 1964	P	D
Holiday Stationstores	Consumer services	Specialty retailers	Bloomington	1928		P	A
Hormel Foods	Consumer goods	Food processing	Austin	1891		P	A
Horton Holding	Industrials	Automotive manufacturing	Roseville	1951		P	A
Hutchinson Technology	Technology	Precision technologies	Hutchinson	1965		P	A
IMRIS	Healthcare	Intraoperative MRI solutions	Chaska	2005		P	A
Jamf	Technology	Software	Minneapolis	2002		P	A
Jefferson Lines	Transportation	Intercity bus service	Minneapolis	1919		P	A
Johnson Boat Works	Consumer goods	Builder and developer	White Bear Lake	1896		P	D
Jostens	Consumer goods	Manufacturer of memorabilia	Minneapolis	1897		P	A
Land O'Lakes	Consumer goods	Agricultural cooperative	Arden Hills	1921		P	A
Life Time Fitness	Consumer services	Health and fitness clubs	Chanhassen	1990		P	A
Lifetouch	Consumer services	Photography	Eden Prairie	1936		P	A
Lunds & Byerlys	Consumer services	Food retailers & wholesalers	Edina	1939		P	A
MacSoft	Technology	Software	Plymouth	1993	Dissolved in 2011	P	D
MAIR Holdings	Transportation	Airline holding company	Minneapolis	1993		P	D
Maurices	Consumer services	Women's clothing retailer	Duluth	1931		P	A
Maxfield Research	Real estate		Roseville	1983		P	A
Media Play	Consumer services	Electronics retailer	Minnetonka	1992	Defunct 2006	P	D
Medtronic	Healthcare	Medical equipment	Minneapolis	1949		P	A
Mesaba Airlines	Transportation	Airlines	Eagan	1944	Defunct 2012	P	D
Minco Products	Technology	Electronic manufacturer	Fridley	1956		P	A
Minneapolis-Moline	Industrials	Tractor and industrial machinery manufacturer	Minneapolis	1929		P	D
MOM Brands	Consumer goods	Food products	Lakeville	1919	Defunct 2015	P	D
MTS Systems Corporation	Industrial	Scientific & technical instruments	Eden Prairie	1966		P	A
Musicland	Consumer services	Entertainment	Minnetonka	1955		P	D
My Pillow	Consumer goods	Pillow manufacturer	Chaska	2009		P	A
Nash Finch Company	Consumer goods	Food distribution	Edina	1885		P	D
Nordic Ware	Consumer goods	Cookware and bakeware manufacturer	St. Louis Park	1946		P	A
North Central Airlines	Transportation	Airlines	Minneapolis	1944	Ceased operations in 1979	P	D
Northern States Power Company	Utilities	Electric & natural gas	Minneapolis	1910	Now part of Xcel Energy	P	D
Northland Organic Foods Corporation	Consumer goods	Global food and agricultural products	Saint Paul	1991		P	D
Northwest Airlines	Transportation	Airlines	Minneapolis	1926	Ceased operations in 2010	P	D
Norwest Corporation	Financials	Banks	Minneapolis	1929	Ceased operations in 1998	P	D
Old Dutch Foods	Consumer goods	Snack foods	Roseville	1934		P	A
PaR Systems	Industrials	Systems engineering	Shoreview	1961		P	A
Park Tool	Industrials	Bicycle parts manufacturer	Shoreview	1963		P	A
Patterson Companies	Healthcare	Dental and veterinary equipment	Mendota Heights	1877		P	A
Pearson's Candy Company	Consumer goods	Food products	Saint Paul	1909	Chocolatier and confectionery manufacturer	P	A
PepsiAmericas	Consumer goods	Bottler	Minneapolis	1962	Ceased operations in 2010	P	D
Perforce	Technology	Software	Minneapolis	1995		P	A
Pillsbury	Consumer goods	Cake manufacturer	Minneapolis	1869	Acquired by General Mills	P	D
Piper Sandler Companies	Financials	Banks	Minneapolis	1895		P	A
Post Consumer Brands	Consumer goods	Food processing	Lakeville	1895		P	A
Quality Bicycle Products	Consumer goods	Bicycle parts and accessories	Bloomington	1981		P	A
Radisson Hotels	Consumer services	Hospitality, hotels, and tourism	St. Louis Park	1909		P	A
Red Wing Shoes	Consumer goods	Footwear	Red Wing	1905		P	A
Regis Corporation	Consumer services	Hair salon & beauty services	Minneapolis	1922		P	A
Republic Airlines	Transportation	Airlines	Fort Snelling	1979		P	D
Runnings	Consumer services	Farming & ranching retailer	Marshall	1947		P	A
Sam Goody	Consumer services	Music & entertainment retailer	Minneapolis	1951		P	A
Schwan's Company	Consumer services	Frozen food	Marshall	1952		P	A
Securian Financial Group	Financials	Financial services	Saint Paul	1880		P	A
Sleep Number	Consumer services	Bedding manufacturer & retailer	Minneapolis	1987		P	A
Slumberland Furniture	Consumer services	Furniture retailer	Oakdale	1967		P	A
Soo Line Railroad	Transportation	Railroad	Minneapolis	1961		P	A
St. Jude Medical	Healthcare	Hospital	Little Canada	1976		P	D
Summit Brewing Company	Consumer goods	Craft brewery	Saint Paul	1986		P	A
Sun Country Airlines	Transportation	Airlines	Minneapolis	1982		P	A
Suncoast Motion Picture Company	Consumer services	Electronic retailer	Roseville	1986		P	D
SuperAmerica	Consumer services	Gasoline stations & convenience stores	Woodbury	1960		P	D
Supercuts	Consumer services	Hair salon	Minneapolis	1975		P	A
SuperValu	Consumer goods	Food distributor	Eden Prairie	1926	Acquired by United Natural Foods in 2018	P	D
Surly Bikes	Consumer goods	Bicycles	Bloomington	1998		P	A
Surly Brewing Company	Consumer goods	Craft brewery	Minneapolis	2005		P	A
Target Corporation	Consumer services	Discount retailer	Minneapolis	1902		P	A
Taylor Corporation	Consumer services	Printing	North Mankato	1975		P	A
The Toro Company	Industrials	Lawnmower & snowblower manufacturer	Bloomington	1914		P	A
U.S. Bancorp	Financials	Banks	Bloomington	1863		P	A
Uni-Systems	Industrials	Kinetic architecture	Minneapolis	1968		P	A
Unicel	Technology	Mobile phone service	Alexandria	1990	Acquired by Verizon in 2008.	P	D
United Hardware Distributing Company	Consumer services	Hardware retailer	Maple Grove	1945		P	A
UnitedHealth Group	Healthcare	Health Insurance	Minnetonka	1977		P	A
Valspar	Consumer goods	Paint supplies	Minneapolis	1806		P	A
Watkins Incorporated	Consumer goods	Health remedies & baking products manufacturer	Winona	1868		P	A
Wilsons Leather	Consumer goods	Leather clothing & accessories manufacturer	Minneapolis	1899		P	A
Winnebago Industries	Consumer goods	Motorhomes manufacturer	Eden Prairie	1958		P	A
World Wide Pictures	Consumer services	Film distributor & production company	Minneapolis	1951	Defunct since 2001	P	D
Xcel Energy	Utilities	Electric & natural gas	Minneapolis	1909		P	A
