= PaR Systems =

PAR Systems, LLC
- Type: LLC
- Industry: Systems engineering
- Predecessor: General Mills
- Founded: Shoreview, Minnesota, United States (1961)
- Headquarters: Shoreview, Minnesota, United States
- Area served: International
- Key people: Karla Leis, President and CEO
- Products: Robotic gantries, custom-solution cranes, CNC waterjet cutters, robot controllers, robotic inspection systems, material handling systems
- Owner: Pohlad Companies
- Number of employees: 500
- Subsidiaries: Ederer LLC; Jered LLC; SDI Lasers Ltd; Oak River Technology; PaR Marine Services, LLC; Marine Systems Technology Ltd
- Website: www.par.com

PAR Systems, Inc, is a systems engineering firm headquartered in Shoreview, Minnesota, specializing in automated manufacturing and material handling equipment. Sspun off from General Mills in 1961 as Programmed and Remote Systems Corporation, it is currently owned by the Pohlad family of Minnesota.

== History ==
=== 1961-2017 ===
PAR Systems was spun off from General Mills in 1961 under the name Programmed and Remote Systems Corporation. The company is involved in medical and technical devices, and aerospace engineering. It has also built robotics and equipment for producing products such as semiconductors.

After the 2011 earthquake in Japan, PaR used cranes to help with decommissioning the Fukushima nuclear site. In 2016, the company's cranes were used in helping clean up the Chernobyl site, providing a "a remote controlled robotic arm suspended by six guide wires that will pick up and carry tools and other items" to be used in the Chernobyl Megatomb. Around 2017, PaR systems was featured in a PBS documentary about the Chernobyl Nuclear Power Plant cleanup.

By late 2017, it employed 380 people, and had sales of about $130 million a year. Most of its employees worked out of Shoreview and Oakdale in Minnesota, and others in Brunswick, Georgia. It had eight manufacturing and service centers.

=== Pohlad purchase ===
in 2017, PAR Systems was acquired by the Minneapolis-based Pohlad family. Over the 18 months after the acquisition, employee count reached 400. In 2018, it provided two massive welding machines to fuse together the liquid fuel tanks for the Vulcan rocket meant to travel to the International Space Station in 2020. It used friction stir welding. Other PaR customers at the time included various medical firms, Emerson, Toyota, Best Buy, Tesla, NASA, SpaceX, and Blue Origin. Mark Wrightsman was CEO and president.

In January 2019, Tom Pohlad became CEO of PaR Systems Inc. He succeeded CEO Mark Wrightsman, who remained on the PaR Systems board and as an advisor. Karla Leis was promoted to Par Systems president and CEO in December 2022. Tom Pohland remained on the board. In 2024, PaR Systems announced plants to move its headquarters in Shoreview to a facility nearby, and by May 2025, had completed the move.

== Subsidiaries ==
PaR Systems has a number of wholly owned subsidiaries in several specialist industries, each has its own product lines, although some projects involve collaboration between subsidiaries.

Subsidiaries (as of 2013) include Jered LLC, specializing in marine equipment and cargo handling systems; Ederer LLC, specializing in custom and specialty cranes and associated equipment; CAMotion, specializing in advanced motion control and Cartesian palletizers and Oak River Technology, specializing in automated manufacturing, testing equipment and medical device manufacturing equipment.

PaR Marine Services was formed in December 2009, when Jered acquired American Heavy Industries Inc, and the UNITEC and NETEC product lines.

== Contracts ==
=== US Navy contracts ===
The PaR Systems subsidiary Jered was the primary contractor for the aircraft elevators on the Nimitz-class aircraft carriers, Tarawa-class, Wasp-class, and half of the Iwo Jima-class ships for the US Navy, as well as the French aircraft carrier Charles de Gaulle and the Spanish aircraft carrier Príncipe de Asturias.

=== Chernobyl crane system ===
PAR Systems was awarded the subcontract for the Main Crane System (MCS) for the Chernobyl New Safe Confinement. the system consists of two overhead bridge cranes, which support two 50-ton trolley hoists, and a Mobile Tool Platform (MTP). The MTP is suspended from a third trolley using a wire rope tensile truss with three paired winches, giving the platform six degrees of freedom. the MTP is equipped with a wide variety of tools, including a manipulator arm, that will be needed to dismantle the Sarcophagus and reactor building so that the radioactive material can be moved to more stable containment. The bridges are 96 meters (315 feet) long, and run on a 150 meters (490 feet) long runway track with six rails. There are shielded garages along the track to allow tools to be exchanged to and from the bridges for maintenance and different operations. Engineering was done by PAR Systems, and manufactured by PAR Systems and PAR Marine.

== Products ==
PaR Systems has several standardized product lines, in addition to custom solutions.

PAR systems specializes in engineering equipment for the nuclear field, designing equipment for nuclear industry hot cells, process facilities and decommissioning applications in Japan, UK and United States. In the aerospace industry, PAR specializes in precision cutting, trimming, drilling, coating, scanning and non-destructive testing equipment PAR Systems has quality certifications in ISO9001, AS9100, ISO13485 and ASME NQA-1 compliant.

Concerning CNC manufacturing, PAR Systems' line of 5-axis waterjet cutters is sold under the Vector brand. they can be used to cut from three-dimensional objects.

== See also ==
- List of Minnesota companies
