= Waterblasting =

Waterblasting or water blasting may refer to:

- Hydrocleaning, the use of high pressure water for cleaning
- Hydrodemolition, the use of high pressure water to remove concrete
