= Horton Holding =

Horton Holding is an American automotive manufacturing corporation from Roseville, Minnesota that produces suspension products, fans and fan drives since 1951. The company has earned the Celebrate Business Success Award from the Saint Paul Area Chamber of Commerce as well as the Paw of Approval Award from Polar Bears International and Como Park Zoo and Conservatory.
