= Chernobyl Nuclear Power Plant sarcophagus =

Structure covering destroyed unit 4 at the Chernobyl Nuclear Power Plant

- Ukrainian: Укриття Чорнобильської АЕС
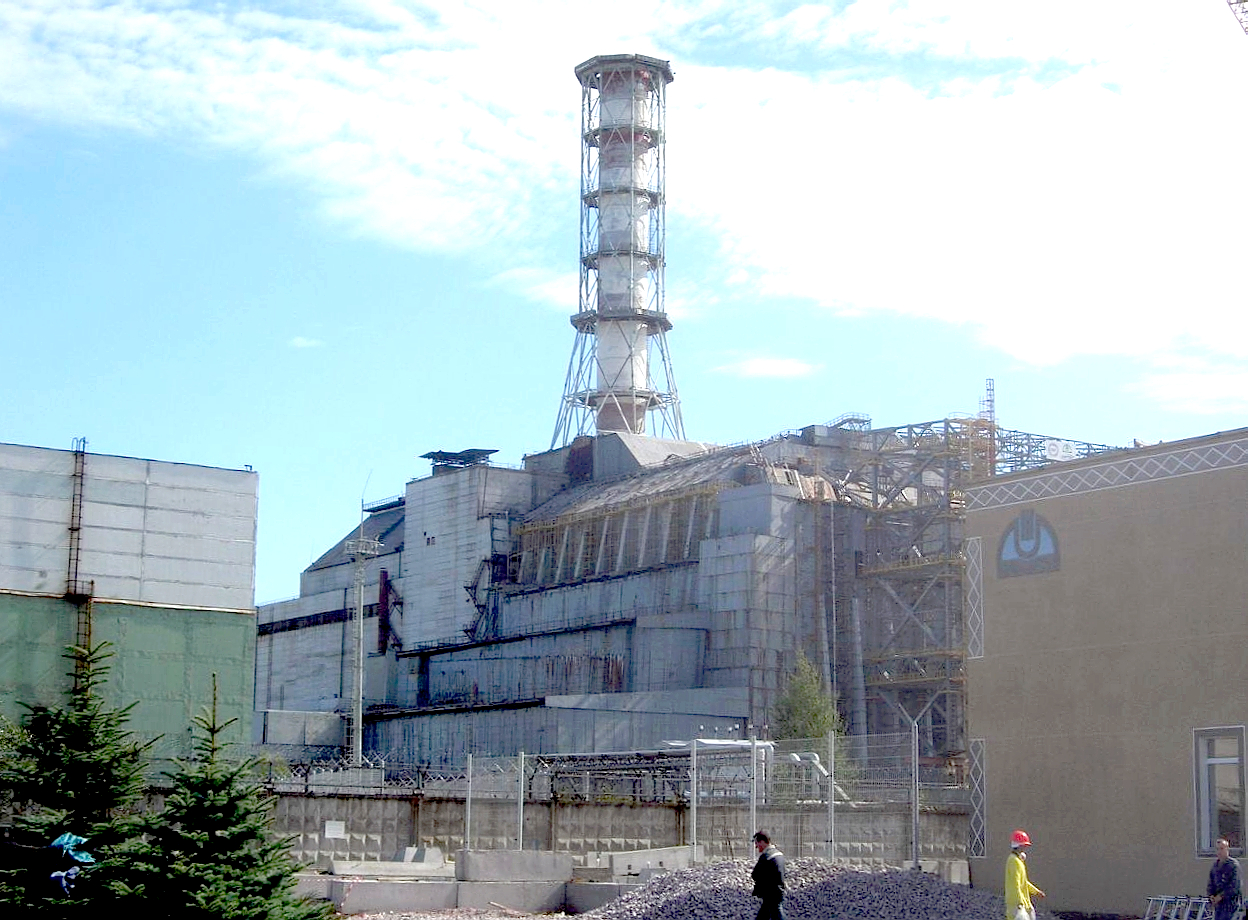
- The sarcophagus in 2006. The tall chimney is an original part of the reactor building.

- Location within Ukraine
- Alternative names: Chernobyl Nuclear Power Plant Shelter Structure

General information
- Status: Deteriorated; succeeded by Chernobyl New Safe Confinement
- Type: Confinement shelter
- Location: Covering Reactor 4 of the Chernobyl Nuclear Power Plant, within the Chernobyl exclusion zone, near Pripyat, Ukraine
- Coordinates: 51°23′23″N 30°05′56″E
- Construction started: June 1986
- Completed: November 1986

The Chernobyl Nuclear Power Plant sarcophagus, also known as the Object Shelter or Shelter Object (Ukrainian: Об'єкт "Укриття", romanized: Ob'yekt "Ukryttya", Russian: Объект «Укрытие», romanized: Ob"yekt «Ukrytiye») is a massive steel and concrete structure covering the nuclear reactor number 4 building of the Chernobyl Nuclear Power Plant. Built in the aftermath of the 1986 Chernobyl disaster, the sarcophagus was designed to limit radioactive contamination of the environment by encasing the most dangerous area and protecting it from climate exposure. The sarcophagus locked in an estimated 200 tons of radioactive lava-like corium, 30 tons of highly contaminated dust and 16 tons of uranium and plutonium.

Structurally, the sarcophagus is largely supported by the damaged reactor building. By 1996, the structure had deteriorated to the point where numerous stabilization measures were required. Internal radiation levels were estimated to be as high as 10000 röntgens per hour in certain areas (normal background radiation in cities is usually around 20–50 microröntgens per hour, and a lethal dose is 500 röntgens over 5 hours). By 2017, the sarcophagus was surrounded by the New Safe Confinement structure, which is designed to protect the environment while the sarcophagus undergoes demolition and the nuclear cleanup continues. The reactor site is located within a large restricted area known as the Chernobyl Exclusion Zone.

The original Soviet-era Russian name is Объект «Укрытие» (Obyekt Ukrytiye), which means sheltering or covering, as opposed to sarcophagus.

== Construction ==
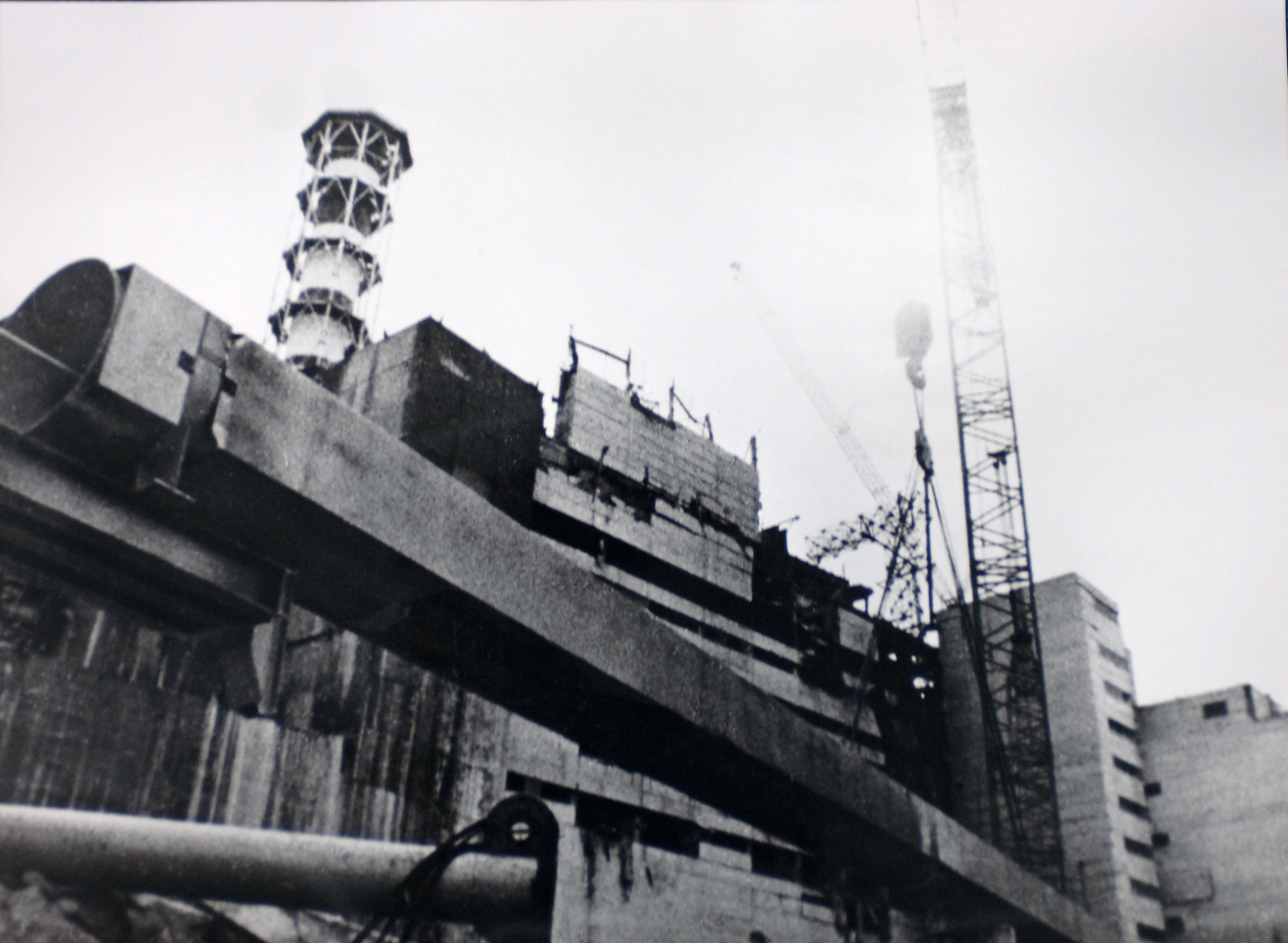
Preparatory steps for building the sarcophagus in 1986

The design of the sarcophagus started on 20 May 1986, 24 days after the disaster. Subsequent construction lasted for 206 days, from June to late November of the same year. Due to high radiation levels, it was impossible to directly screw down the nuts and bolts or apply any direct welding to the sarcophagus, so this work was done remotely where possible. The seams of the sarcophagus, however, could not be fully sealed.

The entire construction process consisted of eight stages:

1. Clearing and concreting of territory around reactor unit 4
2. Erection of initial reinforced concrete protective walls around the perimeter
3. Construction of separation walls between units 3 and 4
4. Cascade wall construction
5. Covering of the turbine hall
6. Mounting of a high-rise buttress wall
7. Erection of supports and installation of a reactor compartment covering
8. The installation of a ventilation system.

More than 400,000 cubic metres (14,000,000 cu ft) of concrete and 7,300 tonnes of metal framework were used during the erection of the sarcophagus. The building ultimately enclosed 740,000 cubic metres (26,000,000 cu ft) of heavily contaminated debris inside, together with contaminated soil.

On 2 October 1986 a Mil Mi-8 Helicopter crashed while engaged in cleanup operations.

On 11 October 1986, the Soviet Governmental Commission accepted a report entitled: "Conclusion on Reliability and Durability of a Covering Constructions and Radiation Safety of Chernobyl NPP Unit 4 Reactor Compartment".

The sarcophagus has over 60 bore holes to allow observation of the interior of the core. In many places the structure was designed to have ventilation shafts to allow some convection inside. Filtration systems prevent radioactive material escaping through these holes.

== Ongoing issues ==
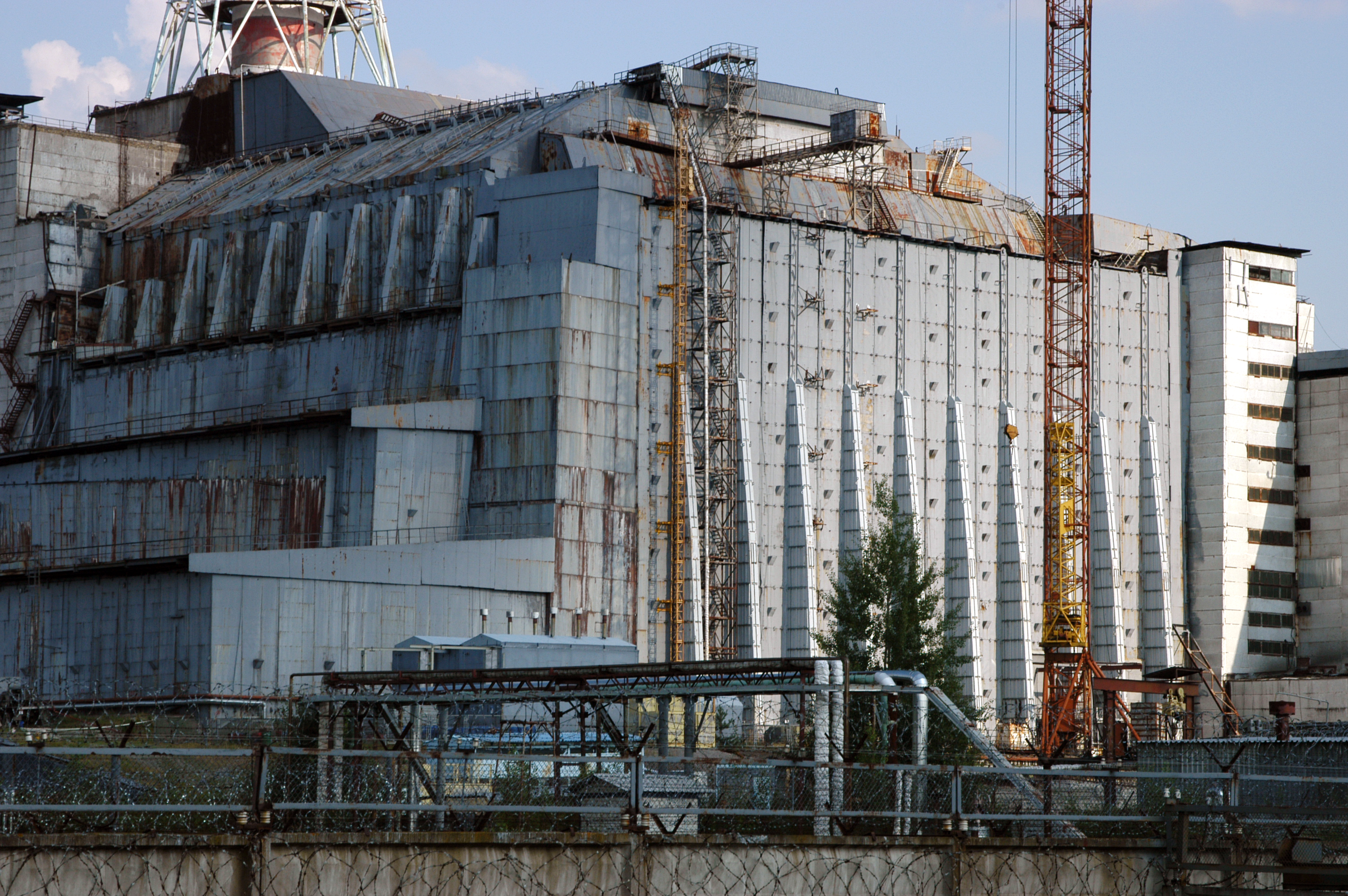
View of the sarcophagus in 2005

The present shelter is constructed on top of the ruins of the reactor building. The "Mammoth Beam" that supports the roof of the shelter rests partly on the structurally unsound west wall of the reactor building that was damaged by the accident. The western end of the shelter roof is supported by a wall at a point designated axis 50. This wall is reinforced concrete and was cracked by the accident.

In February 2013, a 600 square metres (6,458 sq ft) portion of the roof and wall adjacent to the covered part of the turbine hall collapsed into the entombed area of the turbine hall. The collapse did not affect any other part of the Object Shelter (sarcophagus) or the New Safe Confinement. No variances in radiation levels as a result of the incident were detected. The collapsed roof was built after the Chernobyl disaster and was later repaired.

=== Designed Stabilisation Steel Structure ===
The Designed Stabilisation Steel Structure (DSSS) stands next to the wrecked reactor and acts to prevent the wall of the reactor building or the roof of the shelter collapsing. It is 63 metres (207 ft) tall, yellow, and has a series of cantilevers which extend through the western buttress wall. In December 2006 the structure was extended until 50% of the roof load (about 400 long tons (410 t)) was transferred from the axis 50 wall to the DSSS.

=== Upper biological shield ===
A further threat to the shelter is the steel and concrete slab that formed the upper biological shield (UBS), situated above the reactor prior to the accident. This concrete slab was thrown upwards by the explosion in the reactor core and now rests at approximately 15° from vertical. The position of the upper bioshield is considered inherently unsafe, as only debris supports it in its nearly upright position. A collapse of the bioshield would further exacerbate the dust conditions in the shelter, possibly spreading some quantity of radioactive materials out of the shelter, and could damage the shelter itself. The UBS is a disk 17.7 metres (58 ft) in diameter, weighing 1000 tons. The shield is formally called Scheme E and nicknamed Elena. The twisted fuel bundles still attached to it are called Elena's hair.

== Replacement ==
Infographic about the New Safe Confinement

On 22 December 1988, Soviet scientists announced that the sarcophagus would only last 20–30 years before requiring restorative maintenance work. In 1998, with the help of the European Bank for Reconstruction and Development, a conservation programme was completed that included securing the roof beams from collapsing. Nonetheless, the rain-induced corrosion of supporting beams still threatens the sarcophagus' integrity. It was revealed that the water is leaking through the sarcophagus via holes in its roof, becoming radioactively contaminated, and then seeping through the reactor's floor into the soil.

The Chernobyl New Safe Confinement, rolled into place in November 2016, allows for the dismantling of the sarcophagus and for radioactive material to be removed. The containment was expected to cover the existing sarcophagus in 2015. However, delays and a €100 million funding gap caused a year-long delay, before being moved into place in November 2016. The current deadline to dismantle the sarcophagus is 31 October 2029.

As of 2025, the New Safe Confinement was completed and in operation; it was damaged by a drone attack in February 2025.
