= Chernobyl Mi-8 helicopter crash =

1986 helicopter crash in the Ukrainian SSR

- Part of the Chernobyl disaster
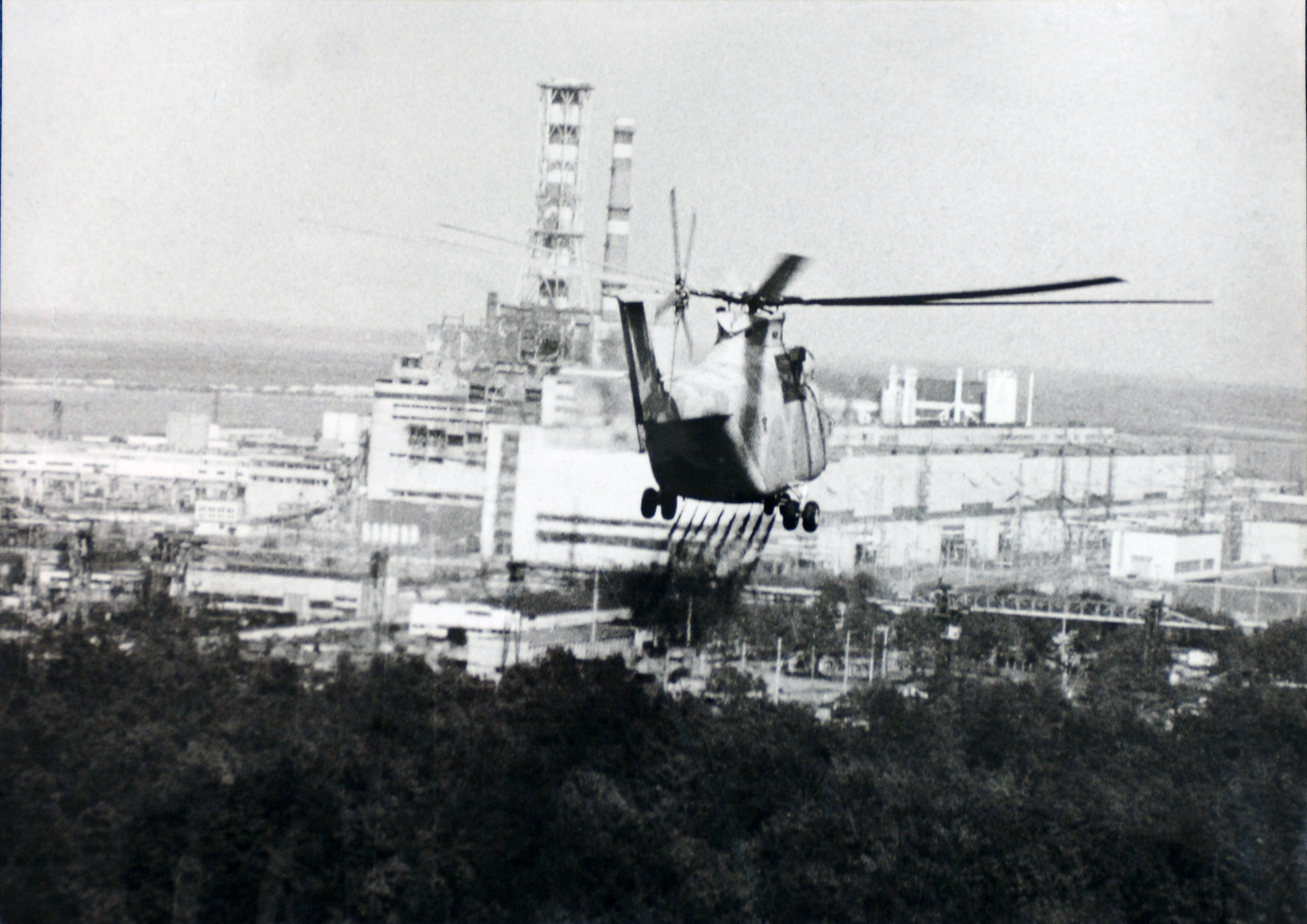
- A Mil Mi-26 helicopter spraying a decontaminant over Chernobyl, 1986
- Date: 2 October 1986; 39 years ago
- Location: Chernobyl Nuclear Power Plant, Ukrainian SSR, Soviet Union; 51°23′21″N 30°05′56″E
- Deaths: Capt. Vladimir Vorobyov; Senior Lt. Alexander Yungkind; Senior Lt. Leonid Khristich; 1st Ensign Nikolai Ganzhuk

On October 2, 1986, a Mil Mi-8 helicopter involved in the cleanup effort that followed the Chernobyl disaster struck a crane and crashed, resulting in the deaths of all four of its crew.

== Crash ==
By October, the "sarcophagus" intended to enclose the remains of the exploded reactor at Chernobyl was nearing completion. Helicopters continued to dump decontaminants over the site in order to combat the high levels of radioactivity. On October 2, a pair of helicopters designated Cup-1 and Cup-2 were assigned to dump two loads, one of sand and lead and the other of polyvinyl acetate glue. The glue was intended to trap the radioactive dust covering the site, allowing it to be safely removed by workers on the ground. Cup-1 completed its mission without incident, but as Cup-2 was passing over the reactor building, its blades struck the cables of one of the cranes involved in the construction of the sarcophagus. The blades shattered and the helicopter plummeted to the ground, landing just outside the reactor building. All four of its crew were killed. A KGB report suggested that the pilot had been blinded by sunlight.

The incident was captured by a member of a visiting film crew.

== Aftermath ==
The four crew members were posthumously awarded the Order of the Red Star. They are commemorated by a memorial at Chernobyl containing a fragment of one of the helicopter's blades.

A fictionalised version of the crash is depicted in the HBO miniseries Chernobyl (2019). The show moves the incident from October to April and implies that it was caused not by a simple collision but by high levels of radiation in the vicinity of the reactor.
