= Chernobyl New Safe Confinement =

Chernobyl Power Plant protective housing

- Новий чорнобильський саркофаг
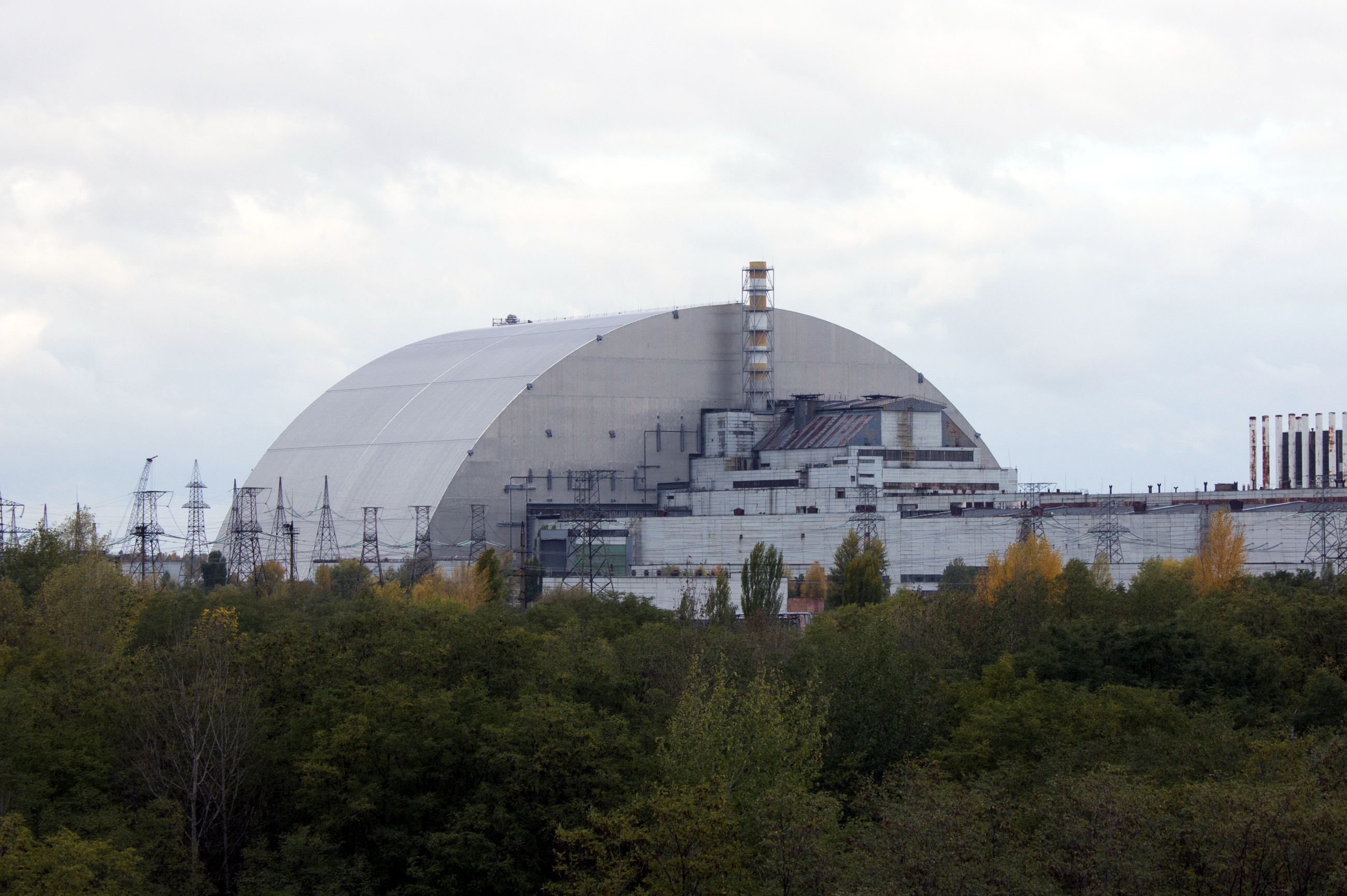
- The New Safe Confinement in its final position over the destroyed reactor 4 in October 2017

- Location within Ukraine
- Alternative names: New Shelter

General information
- Status: Unknown, power supplies cut
- Type: Containment structure
- Location: Chernobyl Nuclear Power Plant, Pripyat, Ukraine
- Coordinates: 51°23′21″N 30°05′36″E
- Construction started: September 2010
- Completed: November 2016
- Cost: €2.1 billion
- Client: Government of Ukraine

Height
- Height: 108 metres (354.3 ft)

Dimensions
- Weight: 31000 t
- Other dimensions: Span 260 metres (853.0 ft), external length 165 metres (541.3 ft)

Technical details
- Structural system: Arch-shaped lattice, clad with sandwich panels
- Material: Steel, with polycarbonate inner panels

Design and construction
- Main contractor: Novarka with 50/50 partners Vinci Construction Grands Projets and Bouygues Travaux Publics as well as Mammoet for conveyance

Website
- https://www.chnpp.gov.ua/en/

The New Safe Confinement (NSC or New Shelter; Ukrainian: Новий безпечний конфайнмент, romanized: Novyy bezpechnyy konfaynment) is a structure put in place in 2016 to confine the remains of the number 4 reactor unit at the Chernobyl Nuclear Power Plant, in Ukraine, which was destroyed during the Chernobyl disaster in 1986. The structure also encloses the temporary Shelter Structure (sarcophagus) that was built around the reactor immediately after the disaster. The New Safe Confinement is designed to prevent the release of radioactive contaminants, protect the reactor from external influence, facilitate the disassembly and decommissioning of the reactor, and prevent water intrusion.

The New Safe Confinement is a megaproject that is part of the Shelter Implementation Plan and supported by the Chernobyl Shelter Fund. It was designed with the primary goal of confining the radioactive remains of reactor 4 for 100 years. It also aims to allow for a partial demolition of the original sarcophagus, which was hastily constructed by Chernobyl liquidators after a beyond design-basis accident destroyed the reactor. The word confinement is used rather than the traditional containment to emphasize the difference between the containment of radioactive gases—the primary focus of most reactor containment buildings—and the confinement of solid radioactive waste, which is the primary purpose of the New Safe Confinement.

In 2015, the European Bank for Reconstruction and Development (EBRD) stated that the international community was aiming to close a €100 million funding gap, with administration by the EBRD in its role as manager of the Chernobyl decommissioning funds. The total cost of the Shelter Implementation Plan, of which the New Safe Confinement is the most prominent element, is estimated to be around €2.15 billion (US$2.3 billion). The New Safe Confinement accounts for €1.5 billion.

The French consortium Novarka with partners Vinci Construction Grands Projets and Bouygues Travaux Publics designed and built the New Safe Confinement. Construction was completed at the end of 2018.

On 14 February 2025, during the Russo-Ukrainian war, a Russian "Geran-2" drone attack significantly damaged the NSC. Both the internal and external layers were breached during the attack.

== Background ==
The predecessor to the New Safe Containment was a structure formally referred to as the Shelter Structure, and often called the sarcophagus. Built between May and November 1986, the Shelter Structure was an emergency measure to confine the radioactive materials within reactor 4 at the Chernobyl Nuclear Power Plant. The Shelter Structure was moderately successful in confining radioactive contamination and providing for post-accident monitoring of the destroyed nuclear reactor unit; it has been estimated that up to 95% of the original radioactive inventory of reactor 4 remains inside the ruins of the reactor building.

However, the Shelter Structure—constructed under extreme conditions and severe time constraints—was never intended to be a permanent containment structure. As such, the shelter's deterioration over the years increased the risk of its radioactive contents leaking into the environment. Additionally the shelter was primarily supported by the remains of the reactor 4 building, which had been damaged by the initial explosion and were considered to be structurally unsound.

Between 2004 and 2008, workers stabilized the roof and western wall of the shelter. However, construction of a new confinement system was deemed necessary to continue confining the radioactive remains of Chernobyl Nuclear Power Plant reactor 4.

== History ==
=== Design and planning ===
In 1992, Ukraine's government held an international competition for proposals to replace the sarcophagus. 394 proposals were submitted by various construction firms. While a short list of 19 finalists was announced, no design was considered a clear winner.

In a 2006 letter to the editor of New Civil Engineer, British civil engineer David Haslewood alleges that his firm, Manchester-based Design Group Partnership, first developed the idea of an arch built off-site to minimize construction workers' radiation exposure, and then slid over the existing sarcophagus. Haslewood claims that his firm partnered with AEA Technology to submit their proposal to the Ukrainian government's design competition, where it tied for second place. The idea would re-emerge in 1996, when a feasibility study organized by the European Commission programme TACIS included it among its suite of recommendations for future development of the shelter project.

A year later, in 1997, the G7 Nuclear Safety Working Group assembled an international team of experts to create a plan to implement the study's recommendations. The result was the Shelter Implementation Plan (SIP), which outlined the steps required for shelter construction.

The SIP originally called for construction to begin in January 1997, and finish in 2004. However, it quickly became clear that the Exclusion Zone lacked the infrastructure necessary to support such a complex project, which would have to be built before construction could begin. Bureaucratic hurdles and coordination issues between the numerous organizations involved in the project resulted in further delays. Finally, a dispute over contractor selection between the Ukrainian government and the European Bank for Reconstruction and Development, which was providing much of the funding for the project, left the project in limbo for over a year.

As a result, it took until 2007 for a contractor for the project to be selected. On 17 September, the contract was awarded to Novarka, a consortium composed of the French construction firms Vinci Construction Grands Projets and Bouygues Travaux Publics. Novarka did not work alone: the consortium collaborated with both Ukrainian and international contractors throughout construction, with firms from 24 nations ultimately contributing to the project.

=== Construction ===
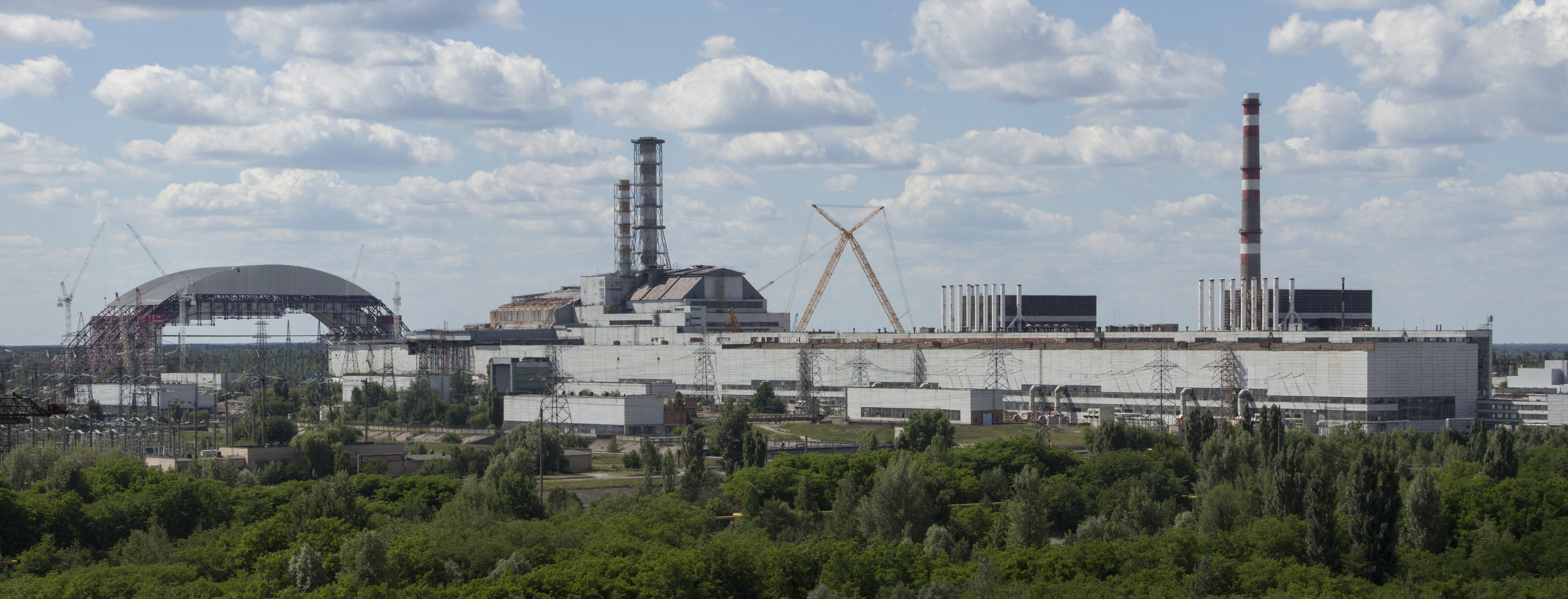
A panorama view of the Chernobyl Nuclear Power Plant in June 2013. The NSC construction area is the arch on the left side.

The construction of the New Safe Confinement (NSC) was plagued by delays and budget overruns. Ultimately, the project took nine years to complete, and cost €1.5 billion.

==== Structural construction and the "slipping" procedure ====
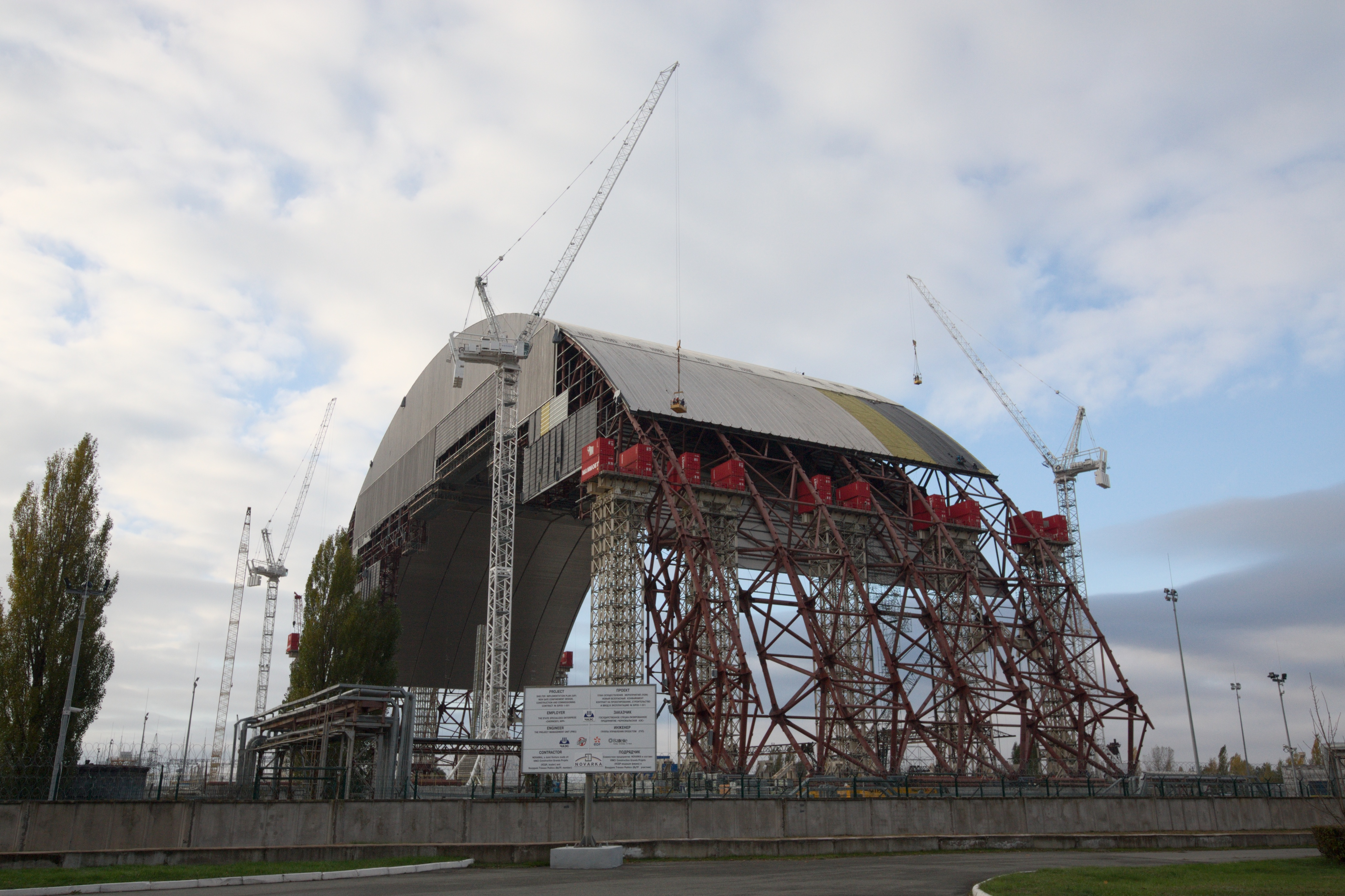
The New Safe Confinement (NSC) under construction in 2013.

In 2009, stabilization efforts for the existing sarcophagus were completed, with the structure considered stable enough for another 15 years. The following year, the infrastructure upgrades to the Exclusion Zone undertaken in preparation for NSC construction were completed. These included road and rail connections, site services (power, water, drains, and communications), facilities for workers (including medical and radiation protection facilities), and the installation of a long-term monitoring system.

With the necessarily preparations complete, Novarka began construction of the NSC itself in September 2010. The first six months of construction were spent on preparatory work such as the NSC's pilings, as well as further improvements to the Exclusion Zone's infrastructure.

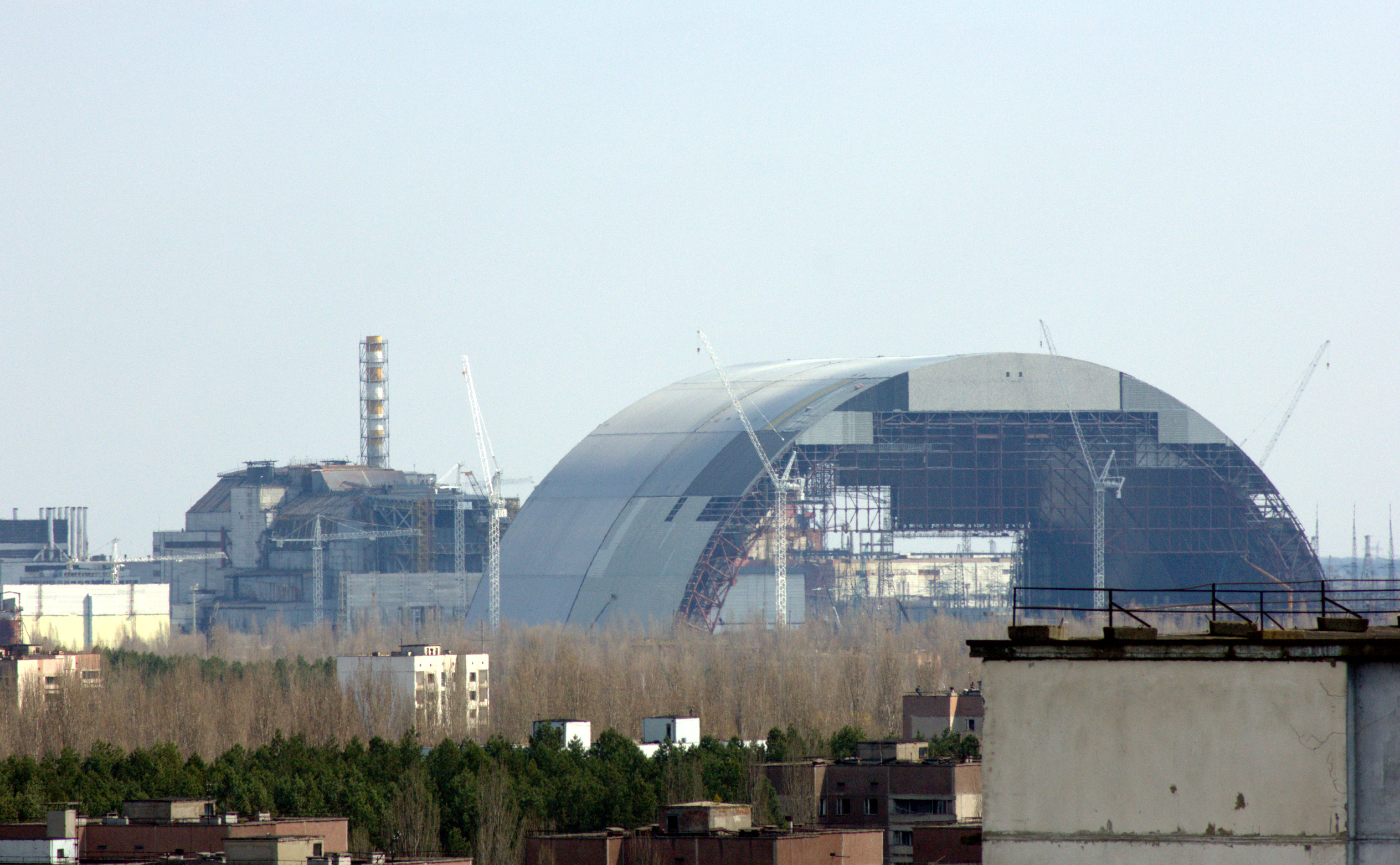
The NSC under construction in April 2015

In April 2012, steel erection began. The first part of the structure to be worked on was its eastern arch. However, its steel frame was initially constructed at the western edge of the NSC's track system, as far from the sarcophagus as possible, to minimize workers' radiation exposure. On 26 November 2012, the completed top section of the arch was raised to allow work on lower sections. The process was repeated in June 2013. Finally, in April 2014, the completed arch was moved 112 metres (367 feet) eastward on its rails to clear the construction area for building the western arch. The construction of the western arch followed a similar process, with completed sections being raised on 4 August 2014 and 12 November 2014. In April 2015, the two arches were welded together, and construction began on the structure's exterior wall. This work was completed in April 2016, finishing the construction of the basic arch structure.

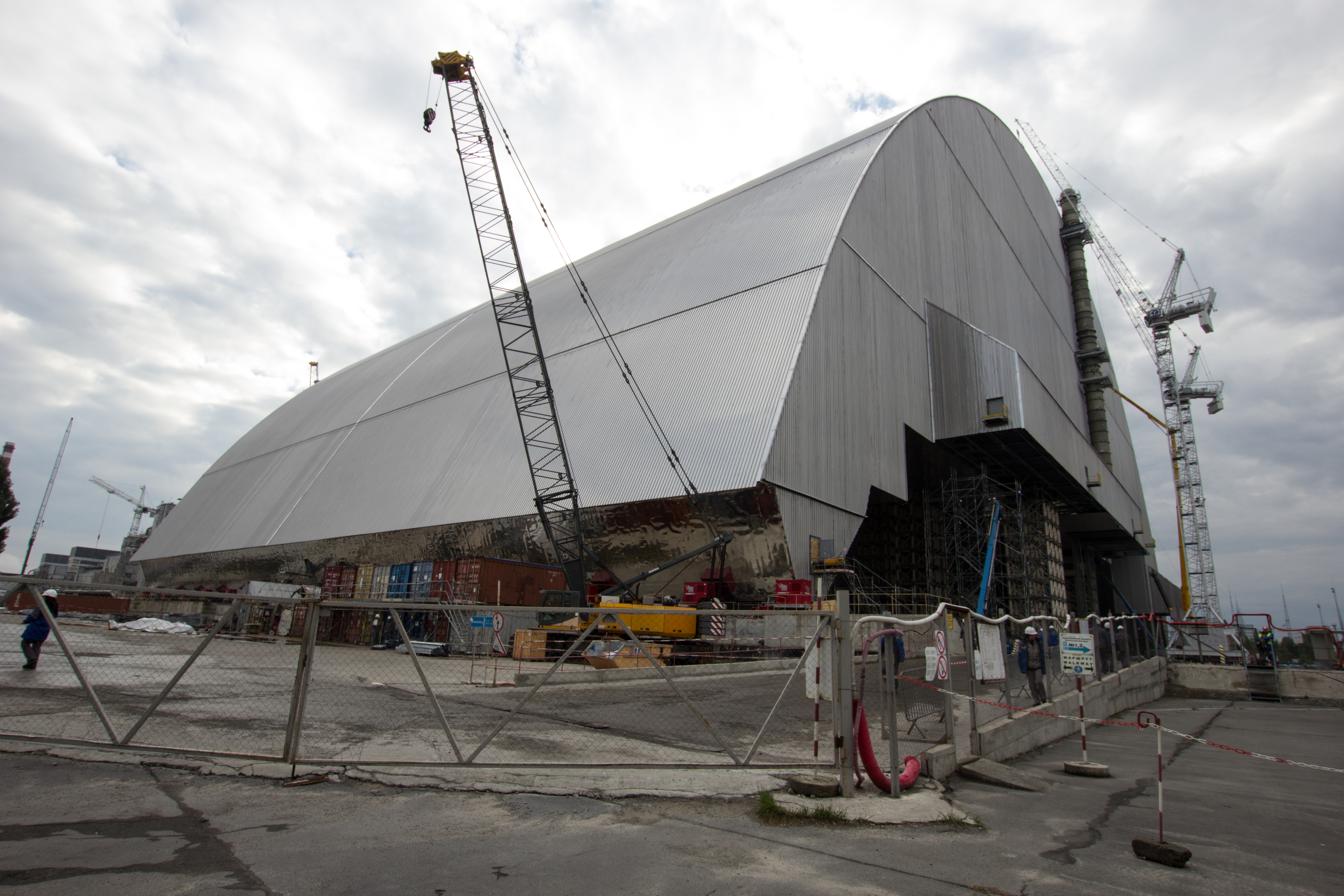
The NSC being prepped for the "slipping" process in October 2016.

On 14 November 2016, Novarka began to "slip" the arch structure over the existing sarcophagus. The arch was pushed across Teflon pads by laser-guided hydraulic pistons. The process took a total of 15 days, with the arch reaching its final location on 29 November 2016.

==== Subsystem construction and testing ====
With structural construction complete, work began on the NSC's various subsystems, such as the radiation monitoring system, the back-up power supply system, the fire protection system, as well as lighting, communication, and HVAC. However, this work was interrupted in December 2017, when the extremely high level of radiation forced workers to limit their presence at the site. This and other bugs delayed further construction by almost a year.

While construction of the NSC itself was on hold, Rodina Consortium - Enerparc AG began construction on the first solar power project to be developed within the Chernobyl exclusion zone. 3,762 solar modules would eventually be installed at the site, with a generation capacity of 1 MW.

In late 2018, Novarka announced that construction of the NSC's subsystems had completed, and they would now begin testing their performance. In February 2019, Novarka announced that all major subsystems had passed their individual tests, and the structure as a whole had passed an integrated test. On 22 April 2019, the NSC began a final 72-hour trial operation test; when it concluded three days later, every system and subsystem passed with flying colors.

==== Completion and opening ceremonies ====
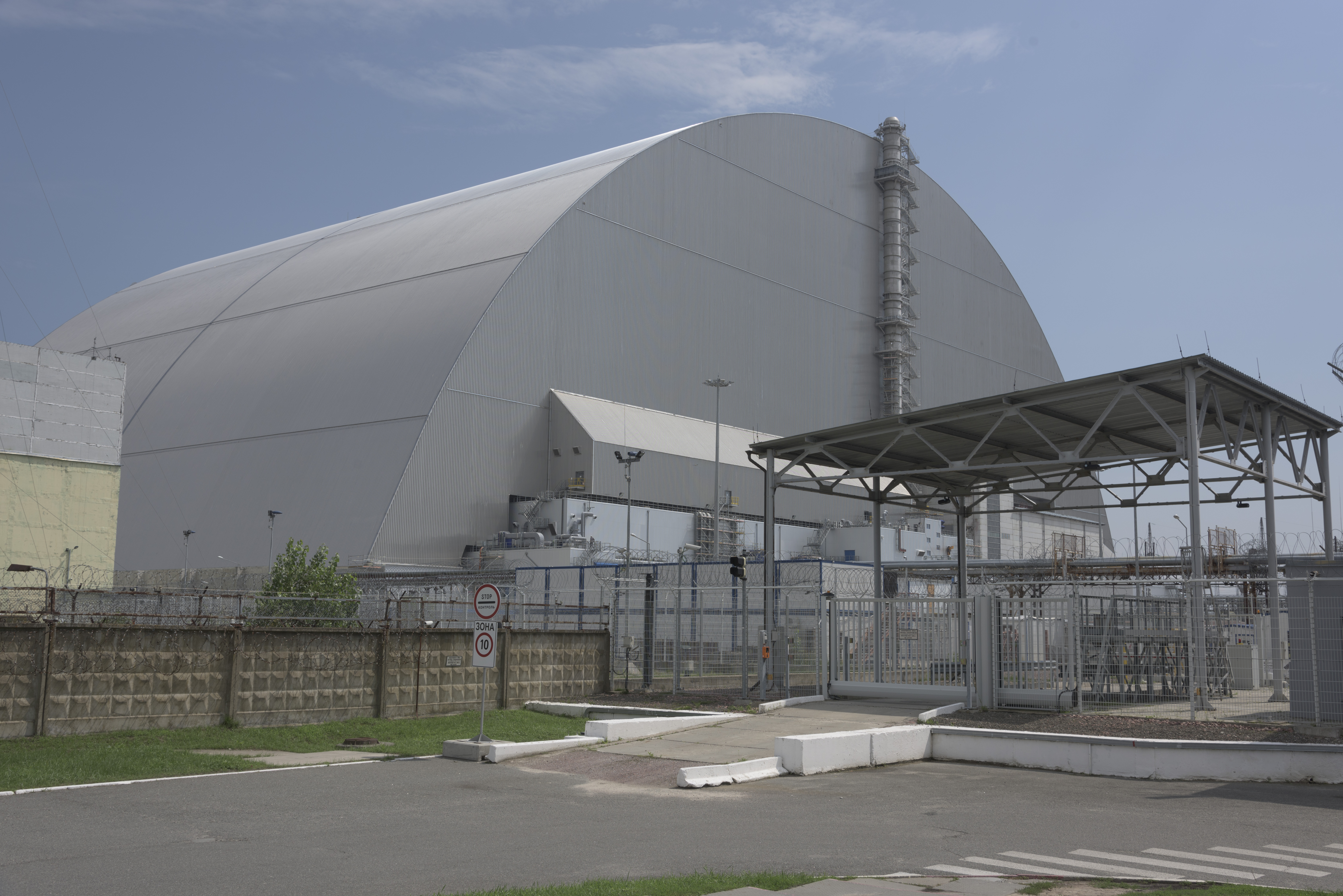
The NSC in July 2018

The NSC was officially declared finished in July 2019. On 3 July, journalists were invited to tour the completed structure. A week later, on 10 July, Ukrainian President Volodymyr Zelenskyy and other Ukrainian government officials attended a ceremony where ownership of the NSC was formally transferred to the Ukrainian government.

=== Russian invasion of Ukraine ===
On 24 February 2022, during the Battle of Kyiv, Russian forces captured Chernobyl. The occupation of the plant lasted until 31 March, when Russia was forced to withdraw from Kyiv Oblast. While the occupation did cause an increase in radiation in the area, this was due to Russian forces disturbing the soil in the Red Forest and releasing radioactive dust. The New Safe Confinement survived the occupation undamaged.

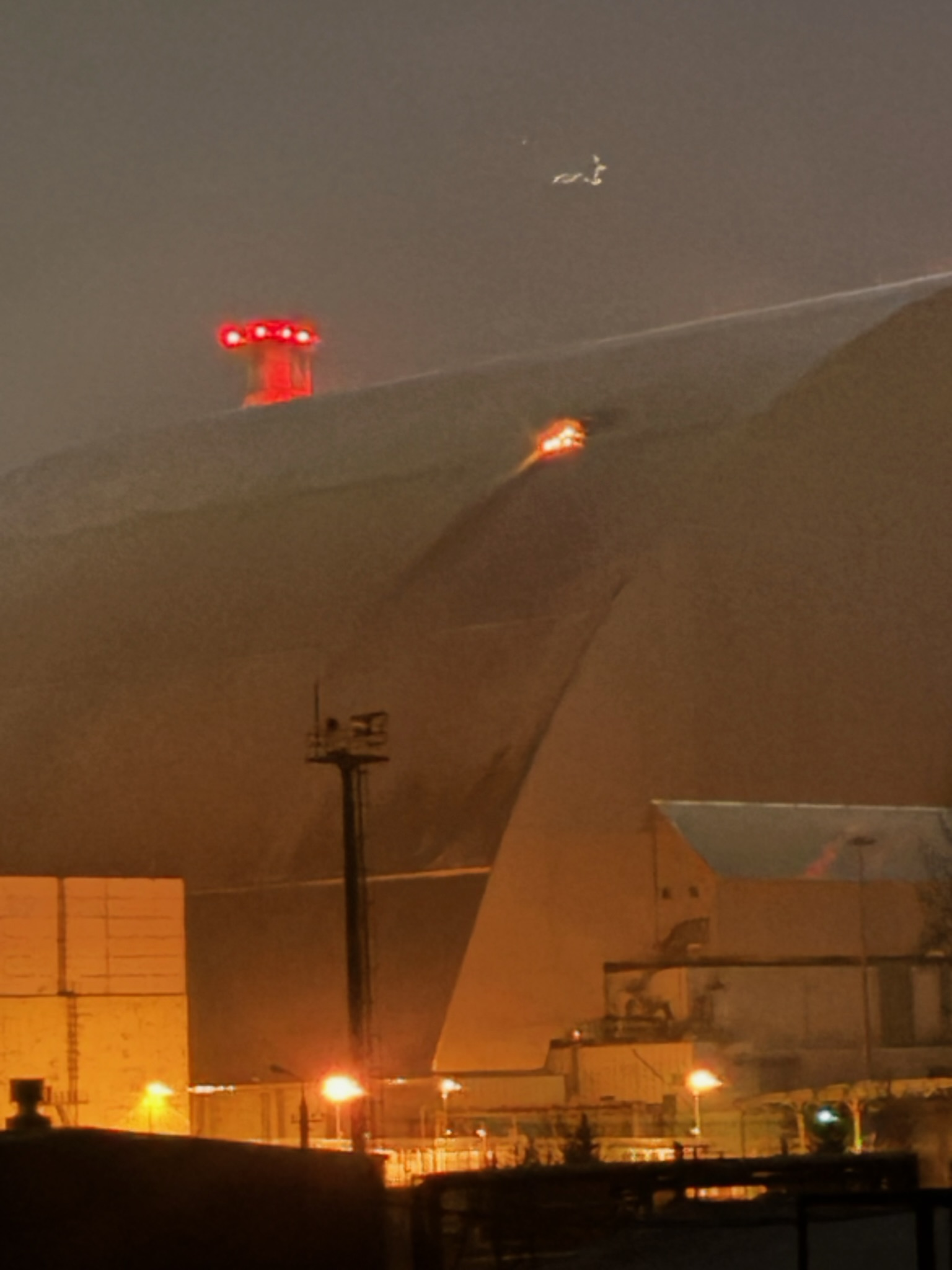
Fire on the New Safe Confinement following a drone strike on 14 February 2025.

On 14 February 2025, a Russian "Geran-2" attack drone struck the New Safe Confinement, causing significant damage. The power plant released a statement indicating that the outer cladding of the structure had been penetrated and that the inner cladding had been damaged as well, with fires affecting the layer of insulation. The innermost layer of the structure was not breached, because the drone struck the northern garage of the gantry crane, which received structural damage but was not fully penetrated. Russia denied it was responsible, and the IAEA has not attributed blame to either side. Early estimates put the cost of repairs at USD$25 million.

In the immediate aftermath of the strike, limited repairs were made to the shelter's roof. Nine months later, an IAEA team arrived to inspect the damage caused by the strike. On 5 December, the organization announced that the New Safe Confinement had "lost its primary safety functions, including the confinement capability". While the shelter's structural supports and monitoring systems had sustained no permanent damage, the IAEA stressed that more comprehensive restoration would be needed in the near-term future to prevent the structure from degrading any further. The European Bank for Reconstruction and Development pledged to provide financial support for the repairs in 2026.

On 1 October 2025, the Ukrainian Energy Ministry stated that power to the structure had been cut for three hours due to Russian airstrikes on the neighboring town of Slavutych. Ukrainian president Volodymyr Zelenskyy accused the Russians of deliberately trying to create a nuclear incident, as they would have been fully aware that the strikes would endanger the New Safe Confinement's power supply.

== Structural design ==
Infographics about the New Safe Confinement

The New Safe Confinement design is an arch-shaped steel structure with an internal height of 92.5 metres (303.5 ft) and a 12-metre (39.4 ft) distance between the centres of the upper and lower arch chords. The internal span of the arch is 245 metres (803.8 ft), and the external span is 270 metres (885.83 ft). The dimensions of the arch were determined based on the need to operate equipment inside the new shelter and decommission the existing shelter. The overall length of the structure is 150 metres (492.1 ft), consisting of 13 arches assembled 12.5 metres (41 ft) apart to form 12 bays. Vertical walls assembled around, but not supported by, the existing structures of the reactor building seal the ends of the structure.

The arches are constructed of tubular steel members and are externally clad with three-layer sandwich panels. These external panels are also used on the end walls of the structure. Internally, polycarbonate panels cover each arch to prevent the accumulation of radioactive particles on the frame members.

Large parts of the arches were shop-fabricated and transported to the assembly site 180 metres (590 ft) west of reactor 4. The steel used in the construction of the tubular members has a yield strength of no less than 2,500 kg/cm^{2} (250 MPa; 36,000 psi).

To prevent corrosion of the structure, stainless steel was chosen as the material for the inner and outer walls. An air conditioning system also circulates warm, dry air at 50 Pa between the layers of the panels to further prevent corrosion. Dehumidifiers keep the air below 40% humidity, preventing both condensation and water from dripping into the interior of the structure.

=== Design goals ===
The New Safe Confinement was designed with the following criteria:

- Convert the destroyed Chernobyl Nuclear Power Plant reactor 4 into an environmentally safe system (i.e., confine the radioactive materials at the site to prevent further environmental contamination).
- Reduce corrosion and weathering of the existing shelter and the reactor 4 building.
- Mitigate the potential consequences of a collapse of either the existing shelter or the reactor 4 building, particularly in terms of confining the radioactive dust that would be produced by such a collapse.
- Enable safe demolition of unstable structures (such as the roof of the existing shelter) by providing remotely operated equipment for their demolition.
- Qualify as a nuclear entombment device.

=== Foundation design ===
The foundations of the New Safe Confinement were designed to meet the primary requirements:

- They must support the weight of the arches of the New Safe Confinement.
- They must support rail tracks across which the New Safe Confinement can roll 180 metres (590 ft) from the construction site into place over reactor 4.
- They must minimize the amount of digging and cutting into the upper layers of the ground, as the upper soil is heavily contaminated with nuclear material from the disaster.

The site of the New Safe Confinement is slightly sloped, ranging in elevation from 117.5 metres (385 ft) on the eastern side to 144 metres (472 ft) on the western side. The foundation was required to account for this difference without extensive site leveling.

The ground upon which the foundation was built is unique in that it contains a technogenic layer just below the surface that is approximately 2.5 to 3 metres (8 to 10 ft) in overall depth. Radioactive contamination from the accident created the technogenic layer. It consists of various materials including nuclear material, stone, sand, loamy sands, unreinforced concrete, and construction wastes. It is considered unfeasible to determine the geotechnical characteristics of this soil layer. As a result of this, no assumptions about the load-bearing properties of the technogenic layer were made during the design of the foundation.

The water table at Chernobyl Nuclear Power Plant fluctuates from 109.9 metres (360.6 ft) on average in December to 110.7 metres (363.2 ft) on average in May.

Several options were considered for the foundation design for the New Safe Confinement. Ultimately, the final design was specified as consisting of three lines of two 4.50-by-1.00-metre (14.76 by 3.28 ft) foundation panels, each 21 metres (68.9 ft) in length, and a 4-metre (13.1 ft) high pile cap that reaches to a height of 118 metres (387 ft) of elevation. This option was selected to minimize the cost of the foundation, the number of cuts into radioactive soil layers, dose uptake of workers, and risk to the environment from further contamination. The foundation has a slight elevation difference between the area in which the New Safe Confinement was constructed and the final resting area around reactor 4.

Special consideration was necessary for the excavation required for foundation construction due to the high level of radioactivity found in the upper layers of soil. The conceptual designers of the New Safe Confinement recommended the use of rope operated grabs for the first 0.3 metres (11.8 in) of pile excavation for the Chernobyl site. This reduced the direct exposure of workers to the most contaminated sections of the soil. Deeper excavation for the foundation piles were accomplished using hydraulic clam shells operated under bentonite slurry protection.

The foundation is designed to withstand horizontal acceleration structural loads of up to 0.08 g, as well as to withstand an F3 tornado. The original design for the structure required it to withstand an F1 tornado until an independent beyond-design-basis analysis was carried out to evaluate the effects of an F3 tornado on the structure.

=== Assembly process ===
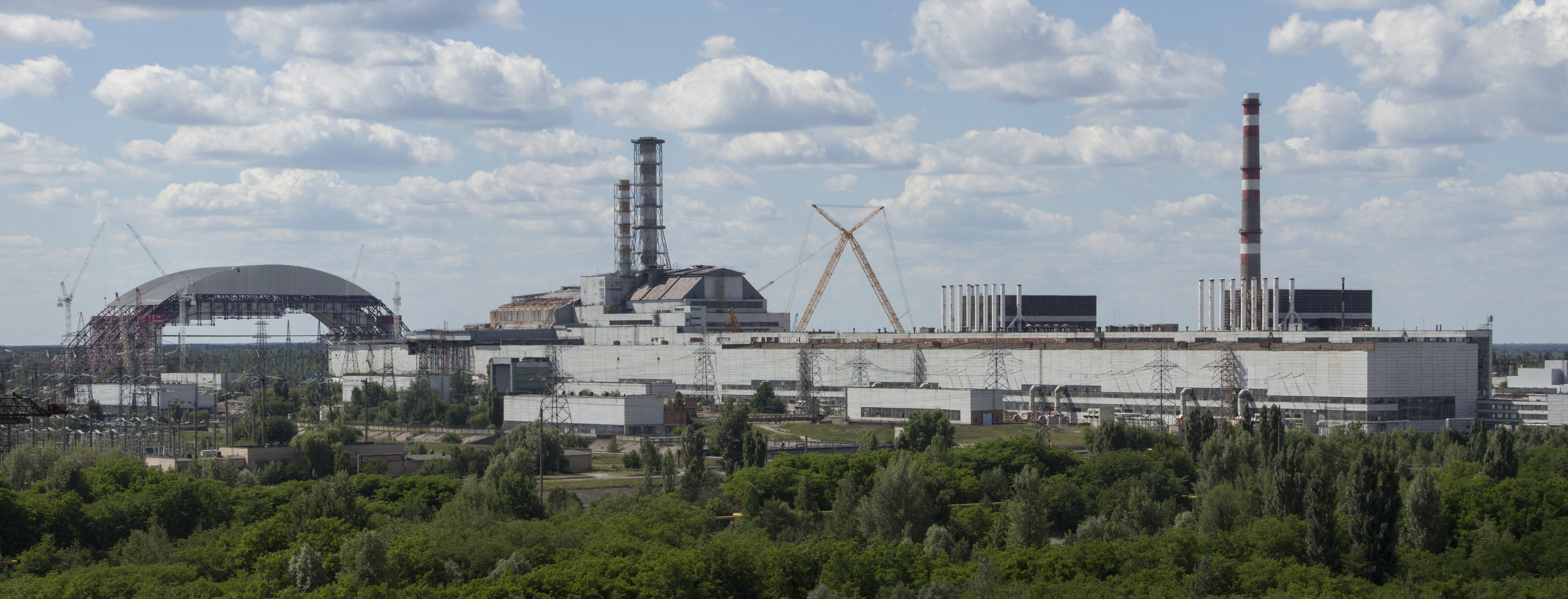
A stitched panorama view of the Chernobyl Nuclear Power Plant site in Ukraine, pictures taken in June 2013. Descriptions of the buildings from left to right: First half of the New Safe Confinement (under construction) after second lifting operation (had not yet reached its final height), reactor 4 with existing shelter building and the new and old ventilation shafts, reactor 3, cranes to dismantle the old ventilation shaft, reactor 2, reactor 1.

The system used in the assembly of the New Safe Confinement derived from civilian bridge launching and bridge cantilever methods. The New Safe Confinement was assembled in the following steps:

1. Stabilization of the Shelter Structure to prevent collapse during construction.
2. Excavation and construction of the foundation.
3. Assembly of first and second arches to form Bay 1, installation of east wall on arch 1.
4. Bay 1 was slid East to accommodate the construction of arch 3 and Bay 2.
5. Subsequent sliding of the complete structure and adding of arches and bays to complete the structure.
6. Installation of cranes and large maintenance equipment.
7. Installation of the west wall.
8. Final slide into place over reactor 4.
9. Deconstruction of the fragmentation, decontamination, and auxiliary buildings. (planned)

This process of assembly was deemed advantageous because it took advantage of the designed mobility of the structure to maximize the distance between workers and the reactor building, thereby minimizing their exposure to radiation.

As each bay was completed, infrastructure equipment — including that for ventilation systems, radiation monitoring, plumbing, and electrical was installed.

=== Positioning ===
The New Safe Confinement was constructed 180 metres (590 ft) west of reactor 4, and slid into place. Sliding of the structure along foundation rails was a difficult process. It was pushed on Teflon pads by hydraulic pistons, and guided by lasers. As of 2018, the New Safe Confinement is the world's largest movable land-based structure.

Two options were initially considered for moving the structure: hydraulic jacks to push the structure forward, or pulling the structure with large, multi-stranded steel cables. The first option would require the relocation of the hydraulic jacks after each push. This process would necessitate more worker interaction with the system and a greater worker exposure to radiation. The second option was initially chosen because it would expose workers to a lower radiation dose, and would have moved the structure into its final position in less than 24 hours. However, the structure was moved using hydraulic jacks, beginning the 327-metre (1,073 ft) move on November 14, 2016, and finishing on November 29.

== Demolition of existing structures ==
The operational phase of the New Safe Confinement involves the demolition of the unstable structures associated with the original Shelter Structure. The goal of demolition has imposed significant requirements upon the load carrying capacity of the arches and foundation of the New Safe Confinement, as these structures must carry the weight of not only the disassembled structure, but also the suspended cranes to be used in demolition.

=== Demolition equipment ===
The New Safe Confinement design includes two bridge cranes suspended from the arches. These cranes travel east to west on common runways and each has a span of 84 metres (276 ft).

Each crane can carry a variety of interchangeable carriages. Three types of carriages have been designed for the New Safe Confinement:

- One typical lifting carriage with a 50-tonne (55-ton) carrying capacity.
- One secure lifting carriage for shielded transportation of personnel, with a 50-tonne (55-ton) carrying capacity.
- One carriage suspends a mobile tool platform, extending up to 75 metres (246 ft), that can be fitted with a variety of end actuators useful for demolition.

The cranes' carriage interchangeability allows the rotation of the largest members to be demolished, reducing the overall size of the New Safe Confinement by approximately one arch bay.

After the members to be demolished are removed by crane, they must be fragmented into pieces small enough to decontaminate. It is expected that the primary contamination of most demolished elements will be loose surface dust and can easily be removed. Decontamination will take place using vacuum cleaners with HEPA filters, grit blasting (for steel elements), and scarifying (for concrete elements). Once decontaminated to the maximum extent practical, pieces will be further fragmented for eventual disposal. Fragmentation tools include plasma arc cutting torches, diamond circular cutting wheels, and diamond wire cutting. The tools selected for the demolition process were selected based on a number of factors including minimization of individual and collective radiation exposure, the amount of secondary waste generated, the feasibility of remote operation, the cutting efficiency, fire safety, capital cost and operating costs.

The exact methods for disposing of wastes generated by the demolition process have not been determined, and may include on-site burial outside the New Safe Confinement for low-level waste, and long-term storage inside the New Safe Confinement for medium and high-level wastes. As of 2018, no policy has been decided for the disposal and processing of fuel containing materials.

=== Elements to be demolished ===
The following elements of the Shelter Structure are planned for demolition:

| Element | Quantity | Mass of each (tonnes) | Length of each (meters) | Length of each (feet) |
|---|---|---|---|---|
| Southern roof flat panels | 6 | 31 | 28.7 | 94.2 |
| Southern roof flat panels | 6 | 16 | 28.7 | 94.2 |
| Southern hockey stick panels | 12 | 38 | 25.5 | 83.7 |
| Mammoth beam | 1 | 127 | 70 | 229.7 |
| Northern beam B1 | 1 | 65 | 55 | 180.4 |
| Southern beam B1 | 1 | 65 | 55 | 180.4 |
| Northern hockey stick panels | 18 | 9 | 18 | 59.1 |
| Eastern hockey stick panels | 1 | 7.25 | 7 | 23.0 |
| Light roof | 6 | 21 | 36 | 118.1 |
| Piping roof | 27 | 20 | 36 | 118.1 |
| Northern beam B2 | 1 | 57 | 40 | 131.2 |
| Southern beam B2 | 1 | 57 | 40 | 131.2 |
| Total | 85 | 1944.25 | | |

=== Types of materials to be demolished ===
The elements that are to be demolished fall into several broad material types:

- Steel
  - Flat (roof panels)
  - Three-dimensional (pipes, trusses, beams)
- Reinforced concrete
  - Pre-cast
  - Cast in place
- Debris
  - Fragments of steel structures and equipment
  - Fragments of reinforced concrete structures
  - Materials added after the Chernobyl accident to mitigate its consequences.

== Waste storage ==
For the removal and storage of nuclear waste within the New Safe Confinement area, the strategies for removing waste are split into three systems. Disposal of solid nuclear waste had the Vector Radioactive Waste Storage Facility built near to the Chernobyl site, consisting of the Industrial Complex for Solid Radwaste Management (ICSRM), a nuclear waste storage site. It is being constructed by Nukem Technologies, a German nuclear decommissioning company, a subsidiary of the Russian Atomstroyexport. This storage is reported to be able to contain 75,000 cubic metres (98,000 cubic yards) of material. The storage is for both temporary high level waste as well as low and intermediate level long-term waste storage.

The Plant on Liquid Radwaste Management (PLRWM) was constructed to remove, store, and process liquid nuclear waste from the Chernobyl site. Processed liquid is turned into solid waste in 200-L barrels where it can then be stored long-term, at a rate of 2,500 cubic meters a year.

Spent fuel is stored long-term in the Spent Fuel Storage Facility. 232 storage containers of nuclear waste can be stored in the facility for an expected 100 years.

== Worker safety and radioactive exposure ==
Even with the distance given from the main reactor during construction of the New Safe Confinement, construction workers were still subject to radiation. Before the slippage procedure began, construction workers may only have been able to stay on the site for 30 minutes at a time due to radiation. The concrete foundation reduced radiation to workers when assembling the structure, and workers were provided decontaminated housing during construction.

Radioactive dust in the shelter is monitored by hundreds of sensors. Workers in the 'local zone' carry two dosimeters, one showing real-time exposure and the second recording information for the worker's dose log. Workers have a daily and annual radiation exposure limit. Their dosimeter beeps if the limit is reached, and the worker's site access is cancelled. The annual limit (20 millisieverts) may be reached by spending 12 minutes above the roof of the 1986 sarcophagus, or a few hours around its chimney. Workers are required to also check their radiation exposure before they leave the New Safe Confinement as an additional measurement for safety.

To minimize radiation to workers when working inside of the New Safe Confinement, many robots and tools are used to interact with objects inside the shelter remotely. The two installed bridge cranes can be operated from within an isolated control room, which allows for demolition to occur without posing risk to any operators. For the radiation mapping that occurs within the New Safe Confinement, robots have been deployed in both areas of high contamination where humans cannot enter and replacing routes that operators would normally take.

Boston Dynamics' Spot model has been implemented in areas of higher radiation to provide detailed radiation mapping without causing additional radiation spikes by minimizing contact points with radiated surfaces. Without posing risk to workers, the implemented systems were able to look inside reactor 4, deep within the New Safe Confinement.

== Responsible organizations ==
The European Bank for Reconstruction and Development (EBRD) is responsible for managing the Shelter Implementation Plan, including overseeing the construction of the New Safe Confinement.

The Bechtel Corporation, a U.S. engineering and construction firm, in support of the Director, Chernobyl Nuclear Power Plant and the European Bank for Reconstruction and Development, provided project management services, overseeing the work of Novarka.

There has been concern that Ukraine, a developing country mired in a decade-long war with its neighbor Russia, would lack sufficient resources to properly maintain the New Safe Confinement on its own. In 2019, Deputy project manager Victor Zalizetskyi stated that "It looks like Ukraine will be left alone to deal with this structure."

== See also ==
- Nuclear and radiation accidents and incidents
