= Fan clutch =

Thermostatic engine cooling fan

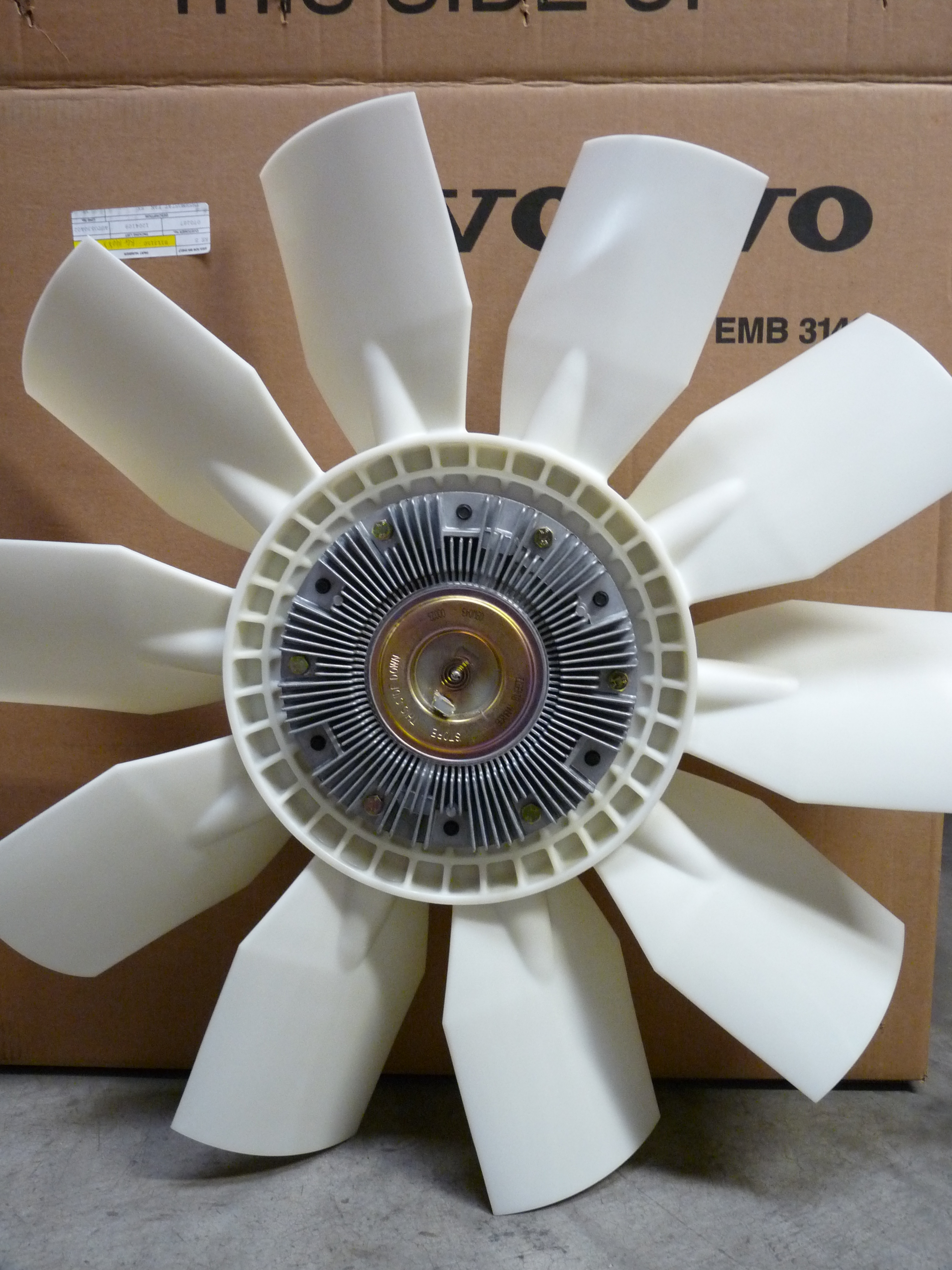
Engine fan with viscous drive

A fan clutch is a thermostatic engine cooling fan that can freewheel at low temperatures when cooling is not needed, allowing the engine to warm up faster, relieving unnecessary load on the engine. As temperatures increase, the clutch engages so that the fan is driven by engine power and moves air to cool the engine.

== Function ==
When the engine is cool or even at normal operating temperature, the fan clutch partially disengages the engine's mechanically driven radiator cooling fan, generally located at the front of the water pump and driven by a belt and pulley connected to the engine's crankshaft. This saves power, since the engine does not have to fully drive the fan.

However, if engine temperature rises above the clutch's engagement temperature setting, the fan becomes fully engaged, thus drawing a higher volume of ambient air through the vehicle's radiator, which in turn serves to maintain or lower the engine coolant temperature to an acceptable level.

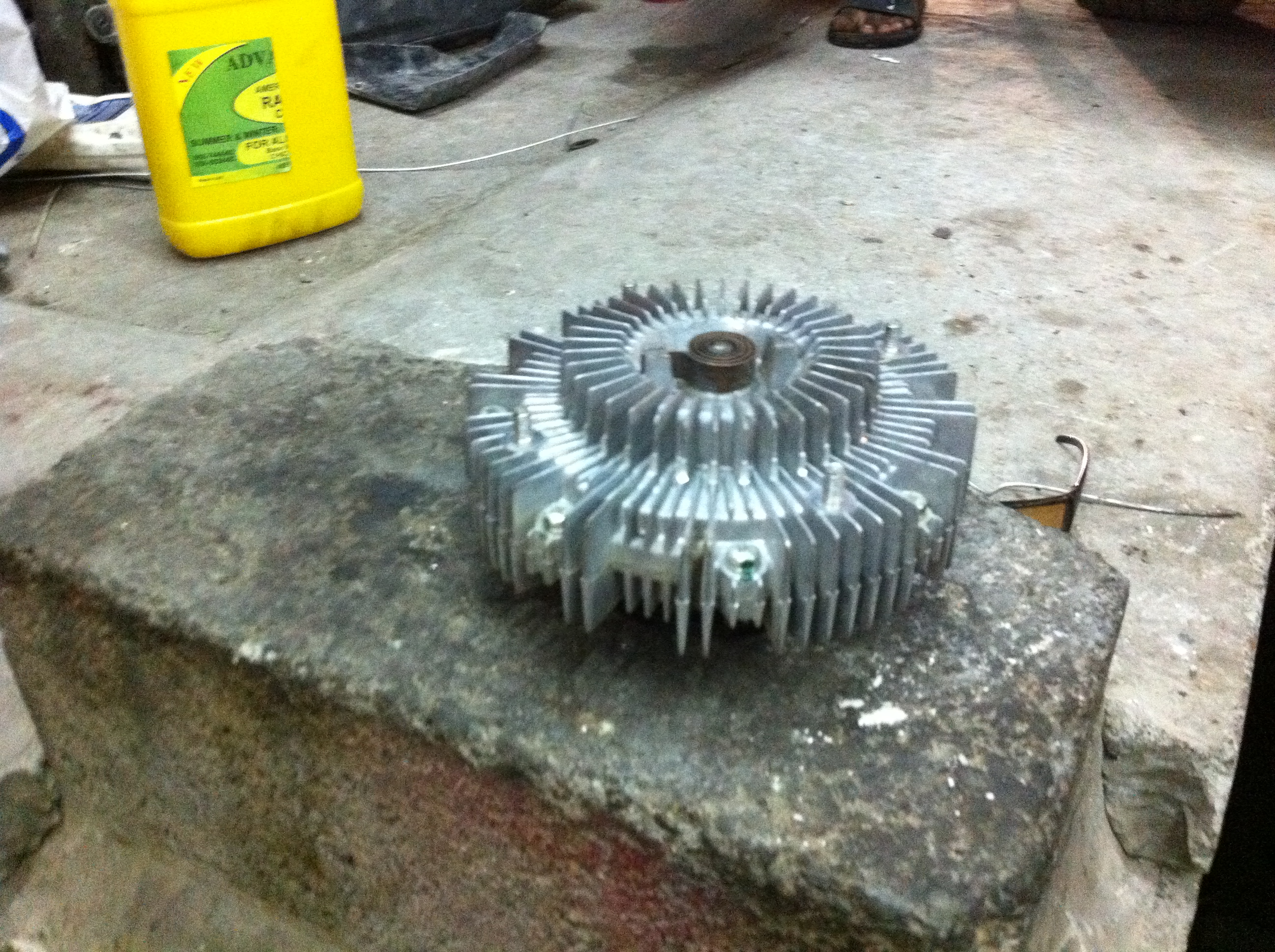
Fan clutch for a 1994 Lexus LS 400

Mechanical fans are most common in trucks and SUVs, and some RWD cars. This is easier to accomplish because the engine is mounted longitudinally, with the belt accessory components mounted facing the radiator. The fan is mounted on the crankshaft pulley or one of the accessory pulleys (e.g. the water pump pulley) and will spin in between the radiator and the engine, drawing air back through the radiator and blowing it over the engine. Even though the air has been heated by passing through the radiator, it is still much less hot than the engine surface, so the airflow over the engine helps with cooling.

In contrast, in a front-wheel drive vehicle, the engine is usually mounted laterally, with the crankshaft and typically all the major accessory shafts parallel to the front axle, so as to directly drive the transaxle; a fan mechanically mounted on an accessory pulley would blow sideways and would not face the radiator. This is why electric engine-cooling fans are used virtually universally in front-wheel drive vehicles. The conversion of mechanical energy to electricity and back to mechanical rotary power with a fan motor is less efficient than a direct mechanical connection, but this is more than compensated by greater control of an electric fan through electronic thermostatic controls which can turn the fan completely off when the engine temperature is below the setpoint.

== Types ==
Most fan clutches are viscous or "fluid" couplings, combined with a bi-metallic sensory system similar to that in a thermostat. Some clutches are electronically controlled (instead of bi-metallic strip). These provide the potential to control the level of engagement depending on any number of inputs. Common controlling factors might include engine oil temperature, transmission oil temperature, coolant temperature, AC system pressures and ambient air temperature.
