= Christopher & Banks =

American retail company

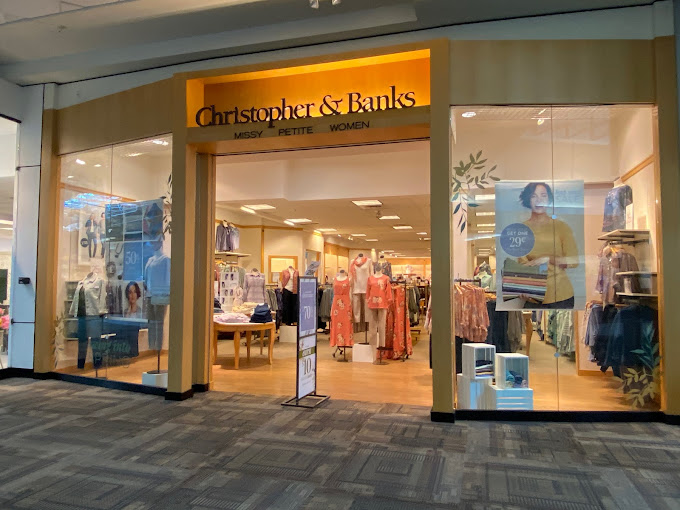
- Type: Private
- Industry: Retail
- Founded: 1956; 70 years ago
- Founder: Gil Braun
- Headquarters: Plymouth, Minnesota, United States
- Number of locations: 451 (February 2020); 5 (January 2022)
- Products: Women's clothing
- Owner: iMedia Brands, Inc. (2021–present)
- Parent: IV Media, LLC (2023–present) (Innovation Ventures, LLC)
- Divisions: CJ Banks (Plus Size)
- Website: https://www.christopherandbanks.com/

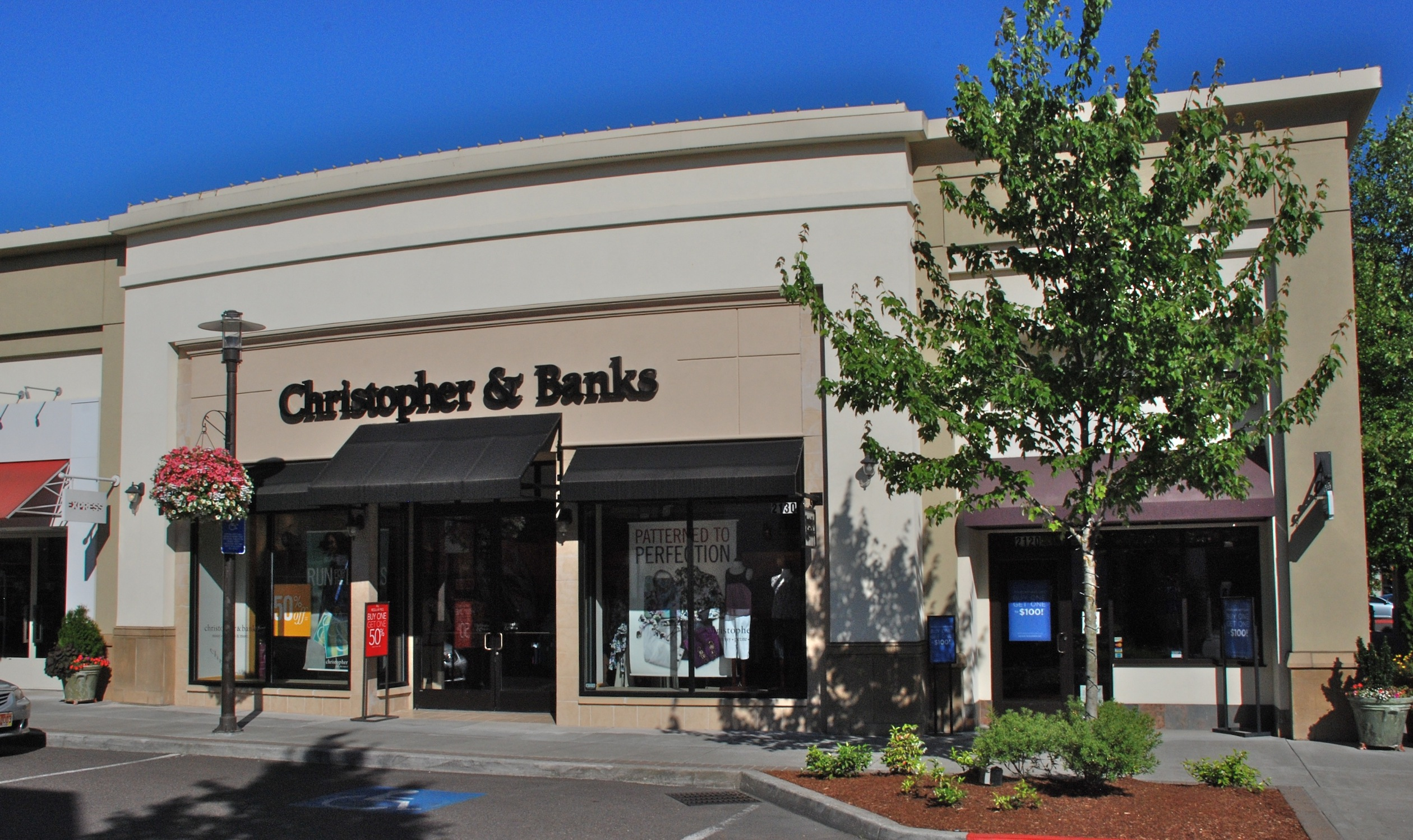
A Christopher & Banks store at a mall in Oregon

Christopher & Banks, originally known as Brauns Fashions, is an American retail company. Originally headquartered in the Minneapolis suburb of Plymouth, Minnesota, the chain specializes in women's clothing for the age 40-60 demographic.

After filing for bankruptcy in January 2021 and closing all of its stores due to financial loss from the COVID-19 pandemic, it had its assets and intellectual property acquired by iMedia Brands, Inc. in early 2021.

On August 16, 2023, Christopher & Banks was included among its parent company's assets sold for $55 million to IV Media, a subsidiary of Innovation Ventures, LLC.

Christopher & Banks is currently operating with both online retail and seven brick-and-mortar locations as of September 30, 2024.

== History ==
Founded in 1956 as Brauns Fashions in Minneapolis, the chain became a public trade company in 1992. After being re-branded Christopher & Banks in 2000, it founded a second brand, CJ Banks (a plus-size clothing store).

In November 2004, Christopher & Banks acquired Acorn Stores and operated that chain as a third retail concept. After reporting its intent on July 31, 2008, it closed all 36 Acorn stores by the end of the year.

On April 4, 2005, the company restated its consolidated statements of income for the fiscal years ended March 1, 2003 and February 28, 2004, as well as for interim periods within the fiscal year ended February 26, 2005, to present the amortization of construction allowances as a reduction of rent expense instead of a reduction of depreciation expense.

In 2014, the company began phasing out CJ Banks stores, and combining the plus-size lines into Christopher & Banks stores. In cases where such stores were adjacent, the stores were combined into one larger store.

In January 2021, the company announced that it filed for bankruptcy and would be closing all stores due to financial loss from the ongoing the COVID-19 pandemic. A vast majority of these stores have either been replaced with other retailers, particularly Daily Thread.

Following bankruptcy, the brand was relaunched under the ownership of Minnesota-based iMedia Brands. As of September 2024, seven locations have been opened, with stores in Ankeny, Iowa; Birch Run, Michigan; Branson, Missouri; Coon Rapids, Minnesota; Fort Wayne, Indiana; Omaha, Nebraska; and Wichita, Kansas.

On June 28, 2023, iMedia Brands filed for Chapter 11 bankruptcy, making the Plymouth-based chain through bankruptcy for the second time in two years. On August 16, Christopher & Banks was among IMBI's assets sold for $55 million to IV Media.
