= Maxfield Research =

Maxfield Research is a Minnesota based real estate research and consulting company. The company aims to empower public and private sector clients in the real estate industry with comprehensive data and insights to make critical decisions related to capital investments.

== History ==
Founded in 1983 by Lee Maxfield and business partner Gary Solomonson, Maxfield Research has grown into a leading Real Estate Data and Insights Provider in the Midwest. The headquarters are in Wayzata, Minneapolis. The current President is Mary Bujold.

== Clients ==
Maxfield serves both the private sector and public sector. The majority of its clients include real estate developers, independent proprietors, and housing authorities. Besides many types of housing studies, the company also conducts demand research for office, retail, food, industrial, and recreational.

In the Minneapolis-St. Paul metropolitan area, Maxfield is best known for evaluating condominium projects and senior housing. Due to regular publishing of real estate market reports, company researchers are frequently sourced and opined by local news.

Maxfield is an independently owned company.
