= Hydrodemolition =

High-pressure water jet used to remove degraded concrete

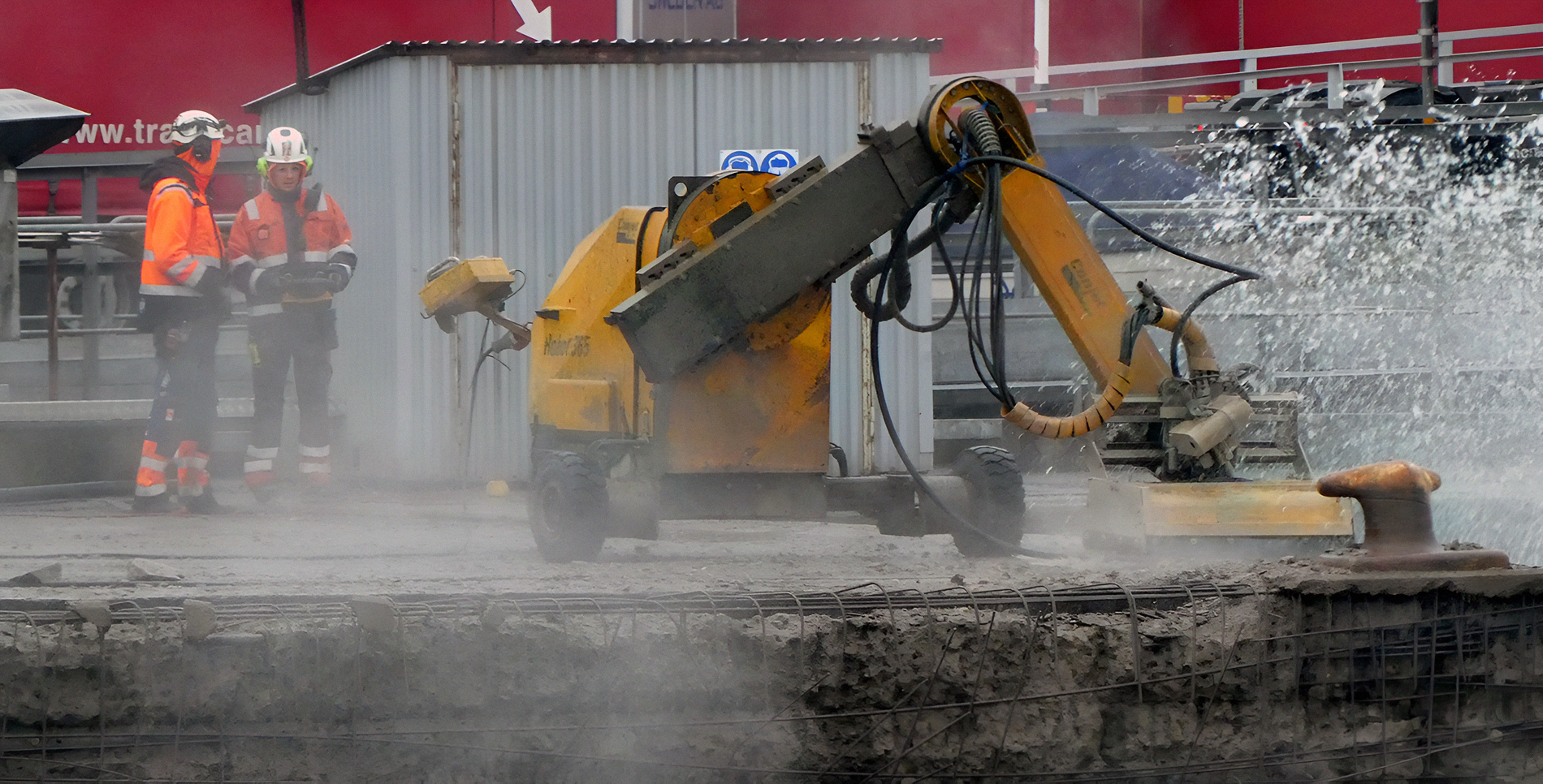
Robotic Hydrodemolition in Ystad, Sweden.

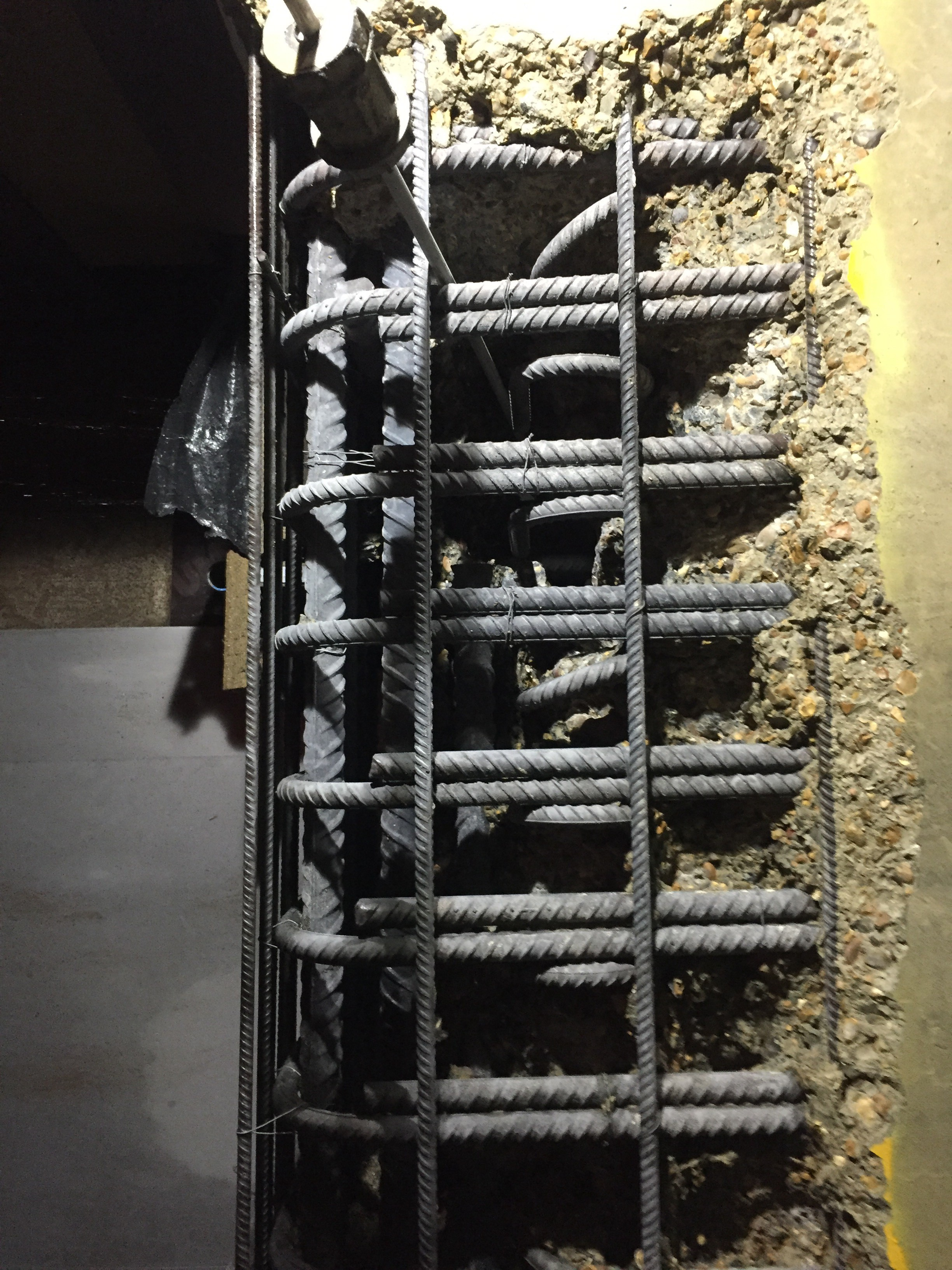
Hydrodemolition of concrete exposing the rebar.

Hydrodemolition (also known as hydro demolition, hydroblasting, hydro blasting, hydromilling, waterblasting, and waterjetting) is a concrete removal technique which utilizes high-pressure water, often containing an abrasive material, to remove deteriorated and sound concrete as well as asphalt and grout. This process provides an excellent bonding surface for repair material and new coating applications. First developed in Europe in the 1980s, this technology has become widely accepted for concrete removal and surface preparation throughout Europe and North America.

Hydrodemolition is not used as much for demolition as it is for surface restoration and protection projects. When concrete has deteriorated or the reinforcing steel has begun to corrode, it is necessary to remove any unsound concrete and reinforcing bars (rebar) in order to replace it with new concrete and maintain the integrity of the structure. This process has also been used to remove sound concrete that is not compromised in any way. This may be done to install a preventive cathodic protection system, or to remove concrete in structures in which vibration is a concern. Unlike jackhammers, hydrodemolition does not produce vibrations throughout a structure and therefore does not introduce micro fractures.

== Applications ==
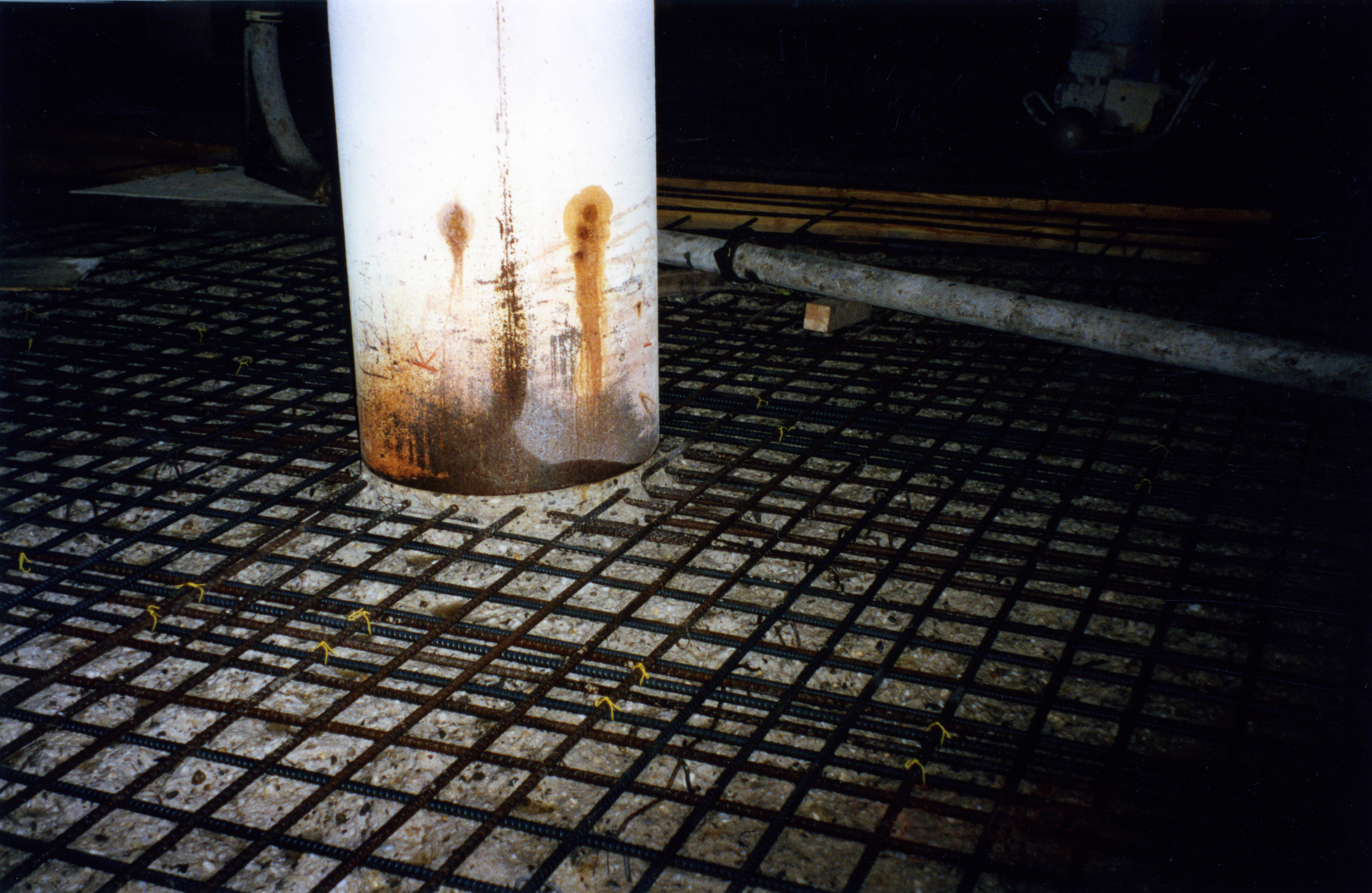
Hydrodemolition around column

“Hydrodemolition can be used for horizontal, vertical, and overhead concrete removal and surface preparation on reinforced and non-reinforced structures. It is effective in removing concrete from around embedded metal elements such as reinforcing steel, expansion joints, anchorages, conduits, shear connectors, and shear studs. Hydrodemolition can be used for localized removals where deterioration is confined to small areas and for large area removals in preparation for a bonded overlay. This technology can also be used to remove existing coatings from concrete.”

— International Concrete Repair Technical Guidelines No. 03737

=== Hydro scarification ===
The process of hydro scarification (a.k.a. hydroscarification or scarification) uses ultra high pressure water to remove the top surface of a concrete bridge or road surface. Usually the removal is within 1/4" to 3/4" at the most, but can be of any depth above the top layer of rebar. Removal of this type is done in order to provide a good microfracture-free surface for bonding with new, sound concrete. Much like applying oil and chips to an asphalt road, this helps extend the useful life of the bridge decking and road surface by delaying the need for complete replacement.

Another application for hydro scarification is for decontamination, as for example is planned to be used in the Chernobyl New Safe Confinement for the concrete of Unit 4 of the Chernobyl Nuclear Power Plant.

=== Partial depth removal ===
Partial depth removal involves the selective removal of deteriorated concrete to a certain depth or of a concrete overlay to a depth exceeding 3/4". It is usually done in the case of concrete restoration projects where embedded objects such as rebar are substantial and need to be preserved. Hydrodemolition is ideal for concrete scarification at precision depths and preserving existing rebar for reuse.

=== Full depth removal ===
Complete removal of a concrete deck is done when it is too deteriorated to keep, but the structural concrete is adequate or can be easily repaired after the hydrodemolition has taken place. It can also be a preferred alternative where a bridge deck has been compromised during initial construction but not yet open to traffic. It allows the preservation of the reinforcement while the deck concrete can be fully replaced to meet the design intent and avoid the need for potential future repairs under traffic. Precast concrete beams are often used in structures such as bridges and parking garages. Hydrodemolition has been used successfully to remove concrete over these beams, where alternate methods such as jackhammers might have caused fractures of the beams.

== Related processes ==
=== Hydrocleaning ===
All types of surfaces can get dirty from excessive use and abuse, water and air pollution, and general exposure to the elements. These surfaces can be hydrocleaned using high pressure water or high pressure water mixed with an abrasive.

=== Coating and sealant surface preparation ===
The use of high pressure and ultra high pressure water has been used to clean various coatings on concrete surfaces for the purpose of repair and reapplication. Coatings are used to protect concrete from the elements, rain, salt, and to create a friendlier surface for human use. Concrete can also be covered with carpet or tiles using a heavy duty glue or mastic. High pressure water can be used to clean these materials off when new carpet or tiles are desired.

=== Airfield rubber removal ===
Commercial and military airfields are required to maintain certain levels of friction on runways to prevent planes from skidding. Runway design, weather and amount of rubber remaining from tire wear all play a role in the level of friction of a landing strip. If too much rubber is present, the friction of the landing strip will be less, requiring more distance for landings, especially in wet weather. High pressure water can be used to remove rubber and restore required friction.

=== Abrasive water jet cutting/ Cold cutting ===
Cold cutting can be used to cut steel, concrete and other materials with the addition of an abrasive feed at the nozzle. Cold cutting is especially useful for cutting of pipes, vessels and tanks in areas where there is a requirement for no sparks or heat generated, such as chemical plants, oil rigs, or even residential neighborhoods, due to the lack of explosive force usually required to break concrete.

=== Hydraulic mining ===
A mining technique using high pressure water jets to carve away rock and harvest minerals.

== Related reading ==
- International Concrete Repair Institute (2004). Guide for the Preparation of Concrete Surfaces for Repair Using Hydrodemolition Methods – Guideline No. 03737. Des Plaines, IL: ICRI.
