= Chernobyl Nuclear Power Plant drone strike =

2025 Russian drone strike at the site of the Chernobyl disaster

- Part of the Russian invasion of Ukraine
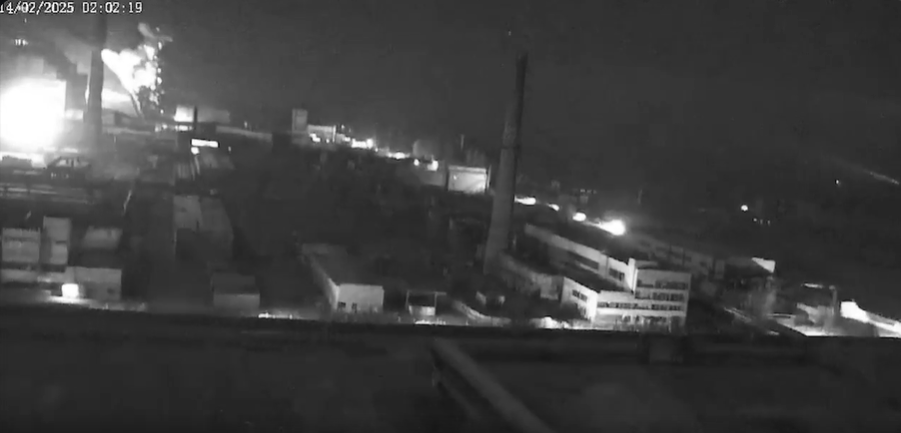
- The explosion (left) that the strike caused
- Location: Near Pripyat, Kyiv Oblast, Ukraine
- Date: 14 February 2025; 01:50 (EET)
- Attack type: Drone attack
- Weapon: Geran-2 drone
- Deaths: None
- Injuries: None
- Perpetrator: Russia

On 14 February 2025, a Russian unmanned aerial vehicle hit the New Safe Confinement structure at the Chernobyl Nuclear Power Plant in Ukraine. The attack resulted in significant damage to the protective shelter, but did not lead to increased radiation levels in the surrounding area. Ukrainian president Volodymyr Zelenskyy said that a Russian combat drone, carrying a "high-explosive warhead", part of a broader attack involving 133 drones on Ukraine that night, had struck the protective housing. Russia denied the allegations, instead claiming that Ukrainian officials made the claim to disrupt peace negotiations.

== Background ==
The strike immediately preceded the Munich Security Conference in Germany, where the vice president of the United States JD Vance was scheduled to meet with Ukrainian president Volodymyr Zelenskyy. The day prior to the strike, United States president Donald Trump announced potential peace negotiations following what he described as a "highly productive" conversation with Russian president Vladimir Putin.

== Strike and responsibility ==
Video of the strike

In the early hours of 14 February 2025, at approximately 1:50 am local time, International Atomic Energy Agency (IAEA) personnel stationed at the Chernobyl site reported hearing an explosion at the New Safe Confinement facility. The facility was constructed to prevent the release of remaining radioactivity from the site of the Chernobyl disaster.

Visual evidence of the strike, shared by President Zelenskyy on social media platform Twitter/X, depicted an intense flash of light emanating from the roof of the facility above Reactor 4, followed by a substantial column of smoke rising into the sky. Ukrainian emergency services responded promptly to extinguish the resulting fire.

According to the Security Service of Ukraine (SBU), the drone that conducted the strike was a HESA Shahed 136 (also known by its Russian name of Geran-2), with the SBU publishing photographs of drone fragments recovered at the site. The Shahed 136 was an Iranian-designed type of drone; Iran supplied such drones to Russia throughout the Russian invasion of Ukraine and its use by Russia is well-documented during the war. The claim was supported by Marcel Plichta of the Centre for Global Law and Governance at the University of St Andrews in Scotland, who added that "Russia frequently uses attacks like this to regain control of the narrative". Polish Foreign Minister Radosław Sikorski and the Centre for Eastern Studies (OSW) also said that a Russian Shahed drone had struck the plant. So did The New York Times in an article by Kim Barker, as well as Le Monde, France 24, CBC News, the Institute for the Study of War (ISW), Estonian writer and literary scholar Epp Annus in an article published in the academic journal Canadian Slavonic Papers and researchers Chad Michael Briggs and Alketa Bucaj in an article published in the journal Environment, attribute the strike to a Russian drone. In an article for the Heinrich Böll Foundation, Ukrainian energy expert and former parliament member Victoria Voytsitska described the drone strike as a deliberate Russian attack.

Barbara Wiaderek and five other researchers stated that Ukraine's allegations against Russia were supported by the broader military context, as the strike took place during intensified Russian drone activity in northern Ukraine. Ukraine had been attacked that same night by Russian forces with 133 Shahed drones, 73 of which were shot down, according to the Ukrainian Air Force. British colonel Hamish de Bretton-Gordon wrote for The Daily Telegraph that there did not appear to be any viable military targets in the vicinity of Reactor 4, adding that Shahed drones were highly accurate "from what we know" of them. He stated that although the drone strike could have been deliberately aimed, it was impossible to be sure due to the attack with over 100 drones that night. According to The New York Times, citing analysis by the British consulting company McKenzie Intelligence Services, the use of a guidance system with preset coordinates of their target by Shahed drones indicated "the almost certain deliberate targeting" of the nuclear power plant by the Russian military.

== Aftermath ==
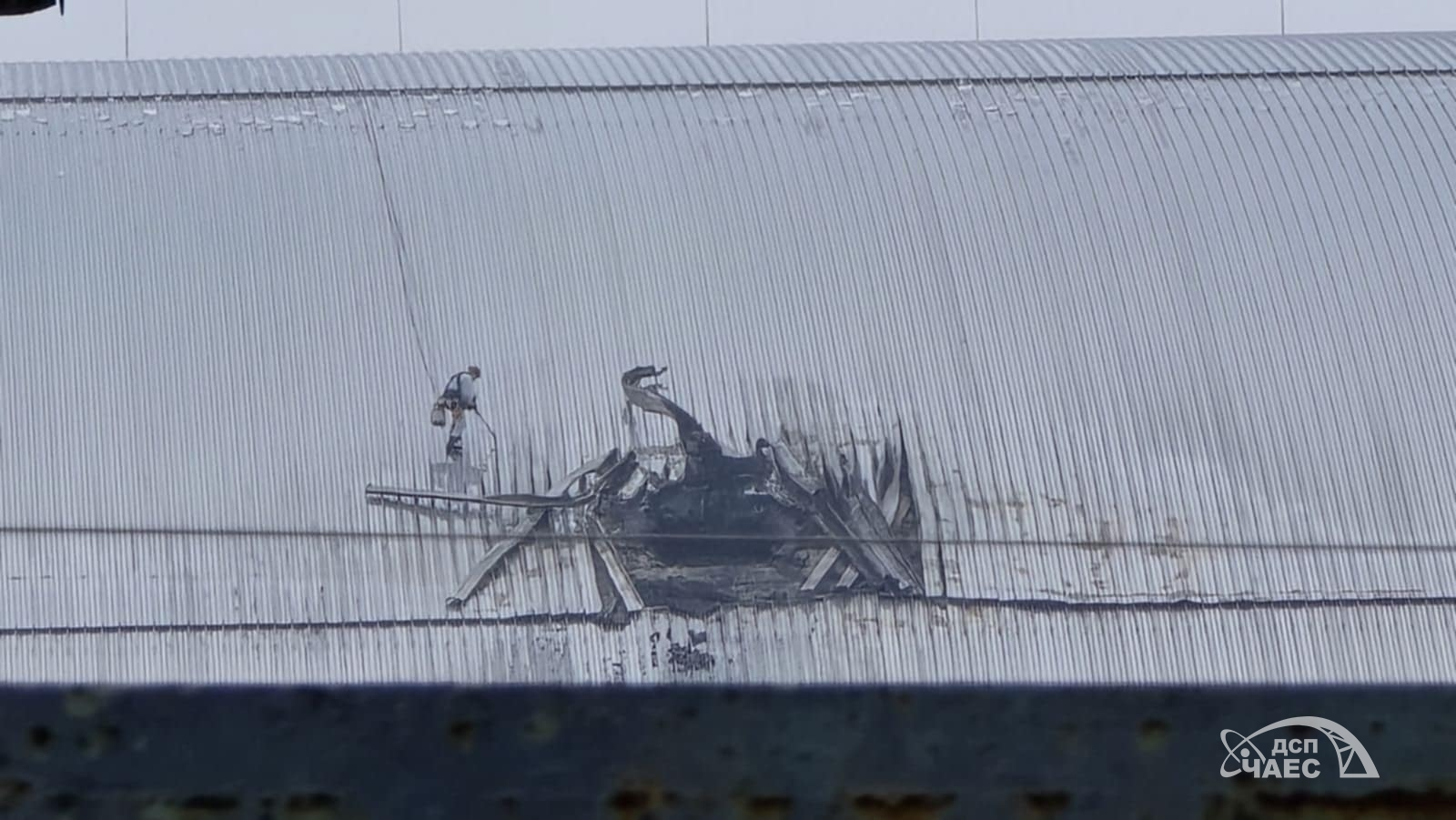
Hole in the confinement

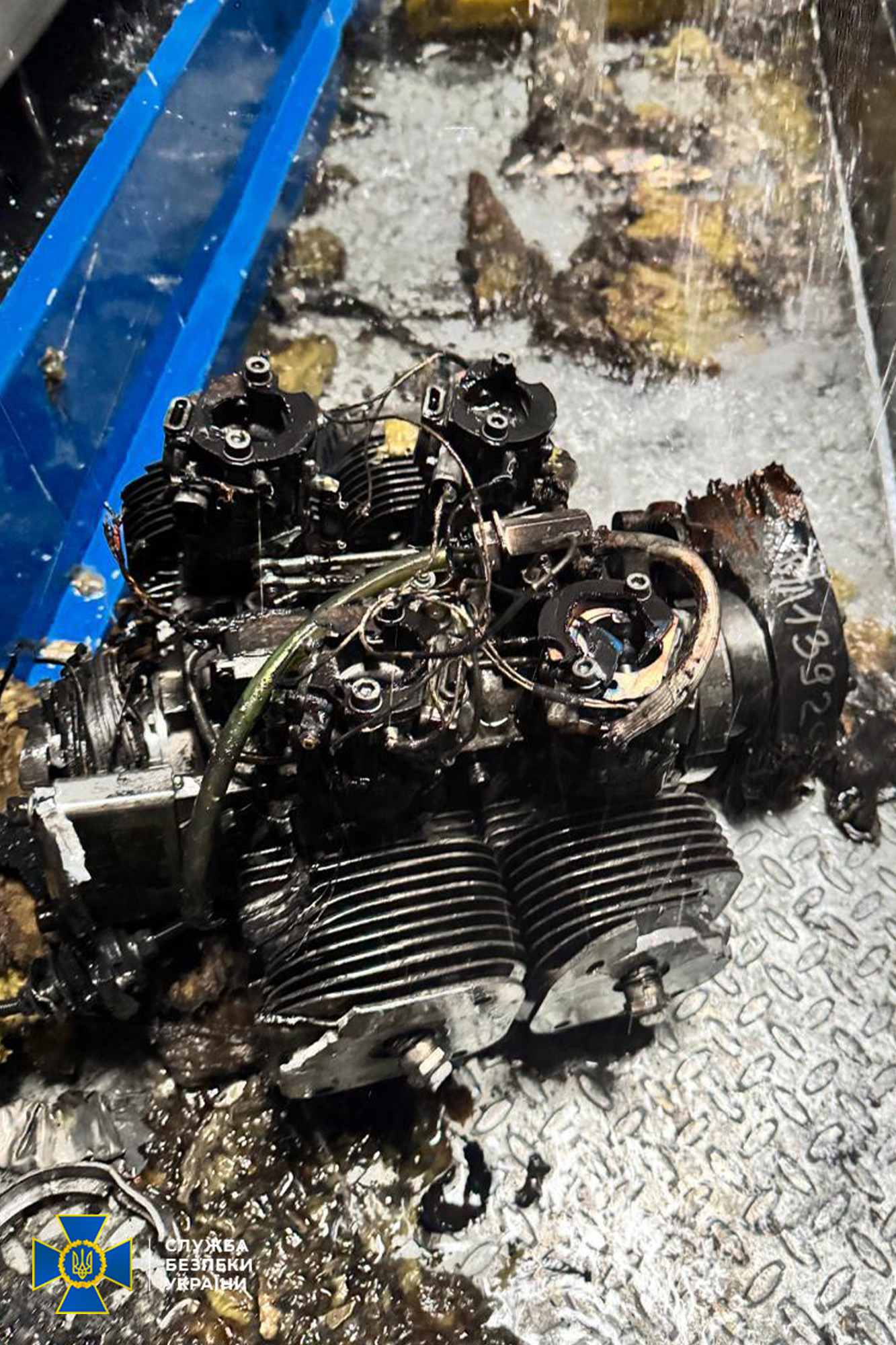
Engine of the drone

Following the strike, Ukrainian authorities conducted immediate assessments of the structural damage and potential radiation risks. The State Emergency Service of Ukraine confirmed that radiation levels remained within normal parameters, though initial evaluations indicated substantial damage to the protective shelter. President Zelenskyy later shared photographic evidence purportedly showing the interior of the damaged sarcophagus.

IAEA experts conducted a walkdown of the containment structure the following day, and observed that the fire had apparently been fuelled by inflammable material in the roof cladding. They observed that a large area had been affected, and confirmed that both the outer and inner cladding had been breached, causing a hole of about six metres diameter. The structural support beams did not appear to have suffered major damage. IAEA experts also stated that the observed remains of a drone that Ukraine attributed to the strike were consistent with a Shahed-type drone. The IAEA has not attributed blame to either side of the conflict.

Two weeks later the roof insulation was still smouldering. Thermal imaging was used to direct the injection of water to extinguish the fires, and repairs to the cladding were started.

In May 2025, the Ukrainian Ministry of Finance reported that the cost of restoration could surpass €100 million, exceeding the €19 million that were held in the EBRD's Chernobyl fund. The French government pledged to provide an additional €10 million.

In December 2025, the IAEA said that the structure could no longer perform its main safety function due to the drone strike. IAEA Director General Rafael Grossi said "mission confirmed that the (protective structure) had lost its primary safety functions, including the confinement capability, but also found that there was no permanent damage to its load-bearing structures or monitoring systems". The European Bank for Reconstruction and Development pledged to provide financial support for the repairs in 2026.

== Reactions ==
President Zelenskyy described the attack and ongoing drone strikes against Ukrainian infrastructure as evidence that Russian leadership was not genuinely interested in diplomatic solutions, suggesting instead that such actions demonstrated an intent to "continue deceiving the world". He urged the international community to institute "pressure on the aggressor", insisting that "Russia must be held accountable for its actions."

The Russian government denied allegations of striking the power plant, with Kremlin spokesman Dmitry Peskov stating that "our military doesn't do that" and claiming that Ukrainian officials made the claim to disrupt peace negotiations. Russian diplomat Rodion Miroshnik similarly accused Kyiv of reacting "hysterically" to the start of dialogue between Putin and Trump by launching large-scale drone attacks on Russian regions. Wiaderek et al. noted that Russian accusations against Ukraine were not supported by any evidence and that analysis of the drone debris and flight trajectory strongly suggested Russian involvement instead.

The Office of the Prosecutor General of Ukraine launched a formal investigation into the drone strike, aiming to gather evidence of the attack being a Russian war crime. Wiaderek et al. asserted that the strike should be classified as a war crime per international humanitarian law, specifically for the targeting of a protected installation and the deliberate intimidation of the civilian population. According to the authors, the attack violated, among others, Article 56 of the Protocol I to the Geneva Conventions, which grants enhanced protection to facilities containing "dangerous forces", including nuclear power plants, during armed conflicts. In addition, the authors argued that, due to the strike's nature as an attack against a non-military facility with the potential to provoke a radiological disaster, it may also be interpreted as state terrorism.

== See also ==
- Capture of Chernobyl
- State terrorism#Russia
- War crimes in the Russo-Ukrainian war (2022–present)
- Zaporizhzhia Nuclear Power Plant crisis
