= Bemidji Woolen Mills =

Bemidji Woolen Mills is a retail store and clothing manufacturer in Bemidji, Minnesota. The company sells clothing and other items geared toward the outdoor living in the north. In addition to their own products, they carry hundreds of items from more than 35 other manufacturers.

The Bemidji Woolen Mills store is located in downtown Bemidji, Minnesota and the manufacturing plant, also in Bemidji, at an industrial park south of town. The company gained some notoriety as the supplier of 2012 Republican primary candidate Rick Santorum's sweater vests.

== History ==
First generation American father and son, Ira P. Batchelder and Ira H. Batchelder, set out to produce the outdoor woolen apparel for the logging industry and created Bemidji Woolen Mills in 1920. The original target area was northern Minnesota and Wisconsin.

== Today ==
After over 100 years in business, Bemidji Woolen Mills continues to manufacture woolen apparel for the outdoor industry. In addition to the large store in downtown Bemidji, their large sewing and manufacturing facility is also located in Bemidji, south of town in the industrial park.
