= Energy in Bulgaria =

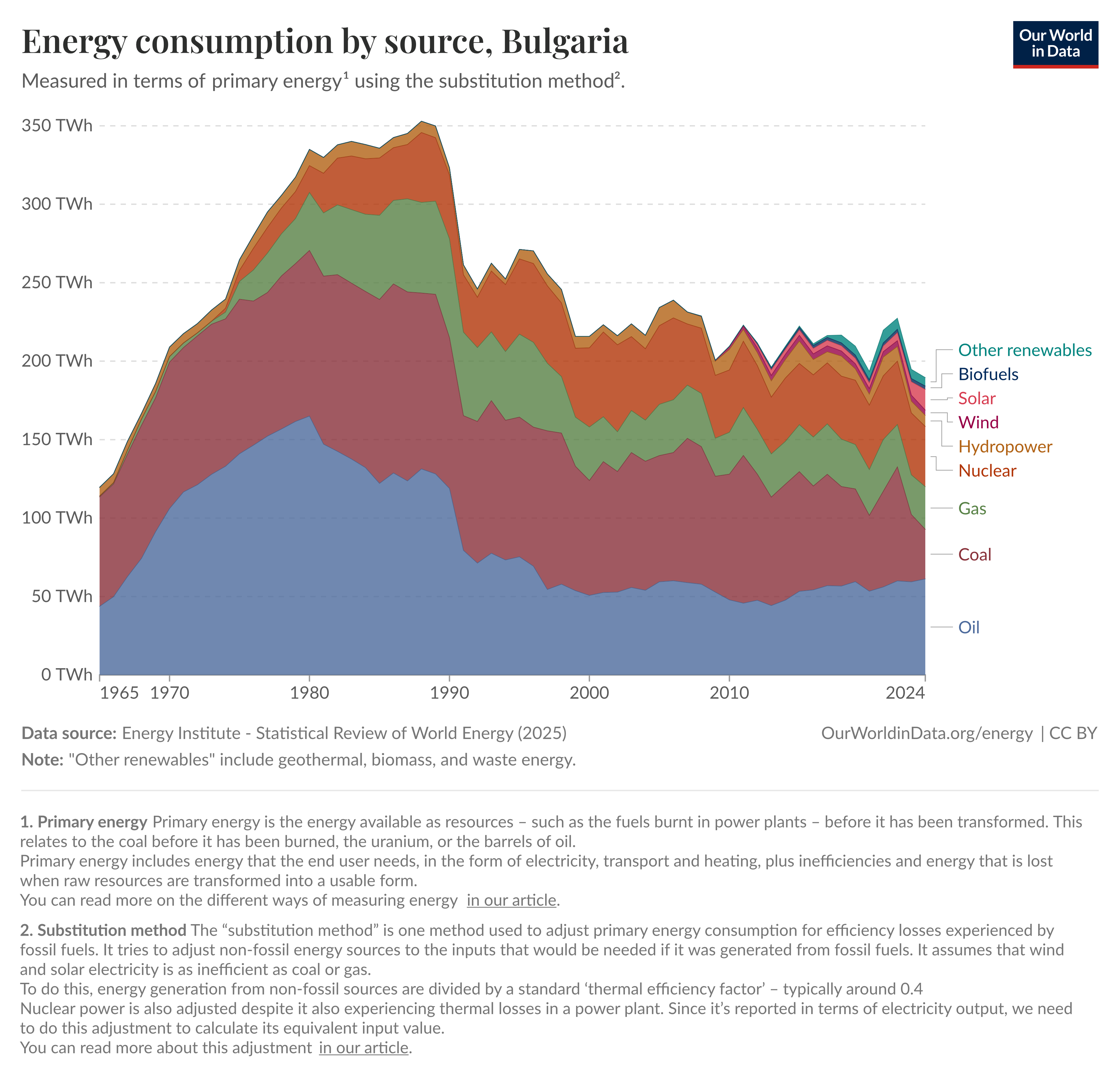
Energy consumption by source in Bulgaria

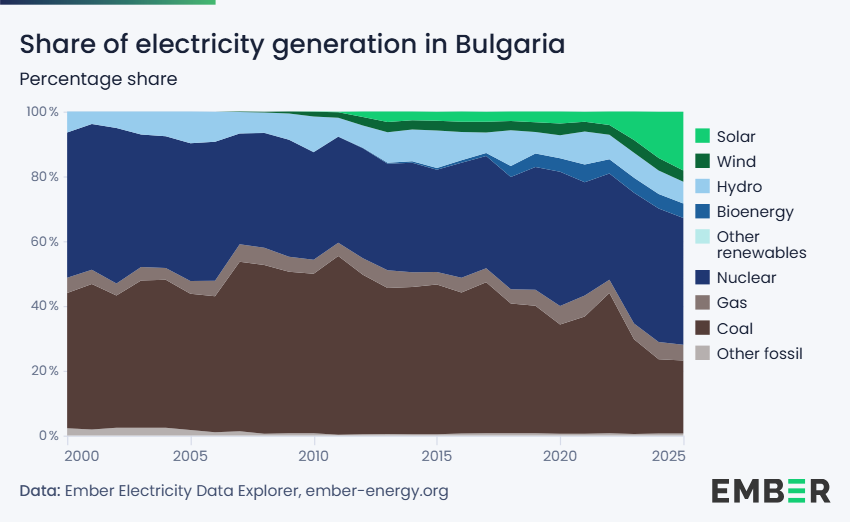
Share of electricity generation in Bulgaria - percentage share

Energy in Bulgaria is among the most important sectors of the national economy and encompasses energy and electricity production, consumption and transportation in Bulgaria. The national energy policy is guided by the National Assembly and the Government of Bulgaria, conducted by the Ministry of Energy and regulated by the Energy and Water Regulatory Commission. The completely state-owned company Bulgarian Energy Holding owns subsidiaries operating in different energy sectors, including electricity: Kozloduy Nuclear Power Plant, Maritsa Iztok 2 Thermal Power Plant, NEK EAD and Elektroenergien sistemen operator (ESO); natural gas: Bulgargaz and Bulgartransgaz; coal mining: Maritsa Iztok Mines. In Bulgaria, energy prices for households are state-controlled, while commercial electricity prices are determined by the market.

Total primary energy production was 10.832 million tonnes of oil equivalent in 2020, of which 23.3% was produced from renewable sources. Energy dependence on foreign imports as of 2020 was at 37.9%, lower than the European Union average of 57.5%.

Bulgaria’s power sector is diverse and well-developed, with universal access to the grid and numerous cross-border connections in neighbouring countries. Although almost totally dependent on imported crude oil and natural gas, Bulgaria is a net exporter of electricity. Total electricity production in 2022 has reached 49.4 TWh, while demand was 37.8 TWh. Per capita production as of 2022 was 7,458 kWh, the highest in Southeastern Europe. In 2023, the largest sources of electricity generations were nuclear power, which accounted for 40.2% of total generation, and coal, which accounted for 29.1%. The aim of reaching over 27% renewables by 2030 was achieved in 2025, in part of the dramatic increase of solar energy, which has surpassed hydropower as the leading renewable source.

== Energy transition ==
In accordance with the European Union's Fit for 55 plan to reduce greenhouse gas emissions by 55% by 2030, as well as the European Green Deal, the country is in the process of becoming climate neutral by 2050 and is thus working on reducing its greenhouse gas emissions by encouraging new renewable power investments. In addition, all of the currently operating coal power plants are expected to close by the end of the decade as they will become economically unprofitable, owing to the recent and future trend of decreasing renewable energy prices. In 2023, the Center for the Study of Democracy made a plan for climate neutrality. As of 2024 Bulgaria is the most energy-intensive economy in the EU.

== Energy sources ==
=== Fossil fuels ===
==== Natural gas ====
Bulgaria is believed to have extensive natural gas resources but, due to a successful campaign against hydraulic fracturing on land, only Black Sea exploration is permitted, such as at the Galata gas field. In 2023, the petrochemical companies OMV and Total estimated that up to 13 billion cubic meters of natural gas could potentially be extracted from the Bulgarian Black Sea exclusive economic zone. As of 2022, domestic production of natural gas remains insignificant, at 17 million cubic meters. The main consumers are the energy and the chemical sectors, which combined account for 54% of the consumption.

Bulgaria consumes about 3 billion cubic meters (bcm) of natural gas. The Gas Interconnector Greece-Bulgaria natural gas pipeline became operational in 2022, and Bulgaria receives about 1 bcm a year from Azerbaijan, with a long-term contract at a price linked to the international oil price. The country imported over 90% of its natural gas from Russia via the TurkStream pipeline under a 10-year contract, which expired at the end of 2022. Due to the 2022 Russian invasion of Ukraine, the contract was not renewed. In April 2022 Russia stopped piping gas to Bulgaria and Poland, due to their refusal to pay in roubles. In response to this, Bulgaria shifted to imports of liquefied natural gas.

In January 2023 Bulgaria signed an agreement with Turkey to enable Bulgaria to buy LNG on the open market and for the liquified gas to be delivered to Turkey where it would be returned to a gaseous state for pumping via the Botas gas network to Bulgaria. The agreement is for 13 years use of the LNG terminals and pumping up to 1.5 billion cubic metres of gas p.a. from those terminals to Bulgaria. The agreement also allows for gas to transit Bulgaria to other European countries. December 2023 saw a Bulgaria-Serbia gas interconnector become operational, 170km long, with a 1.8 billion cubic meters of gas per year capacity, it allows gas to be supplied to Serbia from Azerbaijan, among a number of sources.

==== Oil ====
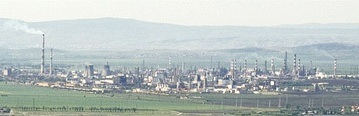
The LUKOIL Neftohim refinery

As of August 2023, Bulgaria imports 3 million barrels per month of Russian-produced oil and is the fourth-largest importer of Russian-produced oil in the world. Only India, China and Turkey import more Russian-produced oil than Bulgaria.

Most oil products are consumed by transport. Lukoil Neftohim Burgas, the biggest oil refinery on the Balkans, refines the predominant amount of the crude oil that eventually reaches the Bulgarian market as refined petroleum. The refinery is owned by the Russian multinational energy corporation Lukoil.

Bulgaria received an exemption from the EU to continue importing oil from Russia, by ship, until December 2024. Part of the terms of the exemption, was that from January 2023 Lukoil will pay taxes in Bulgaria, which it had until 2022 avoided, by paying profits to Switzerland and The Netherlands, Bulgaria believes it will receive €350m in taxes per year. On 5 December 2023, Bulgaria announced that exports of Russian-produced oil will cease by January 2024.

In October 2023 Bulgaria noted Lukoil had found interest from potential buyers for the refinery and that the current 60% tax on revenue would fall to 15% for a new owner, with Russian oil ceasing to be processed after 1 October 2024.

Bulgaria decided to bring forward the cessation of Russian crude oil to 1 March 2024.

==== Coal ====
In the mid-2020s over a quarter of electricity was generated from coal. Bulgaria possesses significant reserves of coal estimated at 4.8 billion tons. More than 92% of them, or 4.5 billion tons, is lignite, which is the lowest rank of coal due to its relatively low-heat content. Maritsa Iztok, situated in the Upper Thracian Plain, is by far the largest coal basin in the country. It powers Maritsa Iztok Complex, the largest energy complex in South-Eastern Europe, which pollutes the air. Other lignite basins include Sofia Valley, Elhovo, Lom, and Maritsa Zapad. The reserves of sub-bituminous coal are 300 million tons, situated mainly near Bobov Dol, Pernik and Burgas.

As of 2022, coal production was 36 million tons, of them 98% were lignite and 2% sub-bituminous coal. The mines of Maritsa Iztok accounted for 98.6% of the lignite etraction. About 97% of the coal production was utilised for electrical and thermal power generation, and further 2% were used for the production of briquettes. Bulgaria plans to reduce coal as an energy source from 2030, with coal being discontinued in 2038. The EU is providing 1.2 billion euros to help a just transition to phase out coal.

=== Renewable energy ===
==== Solar power ====
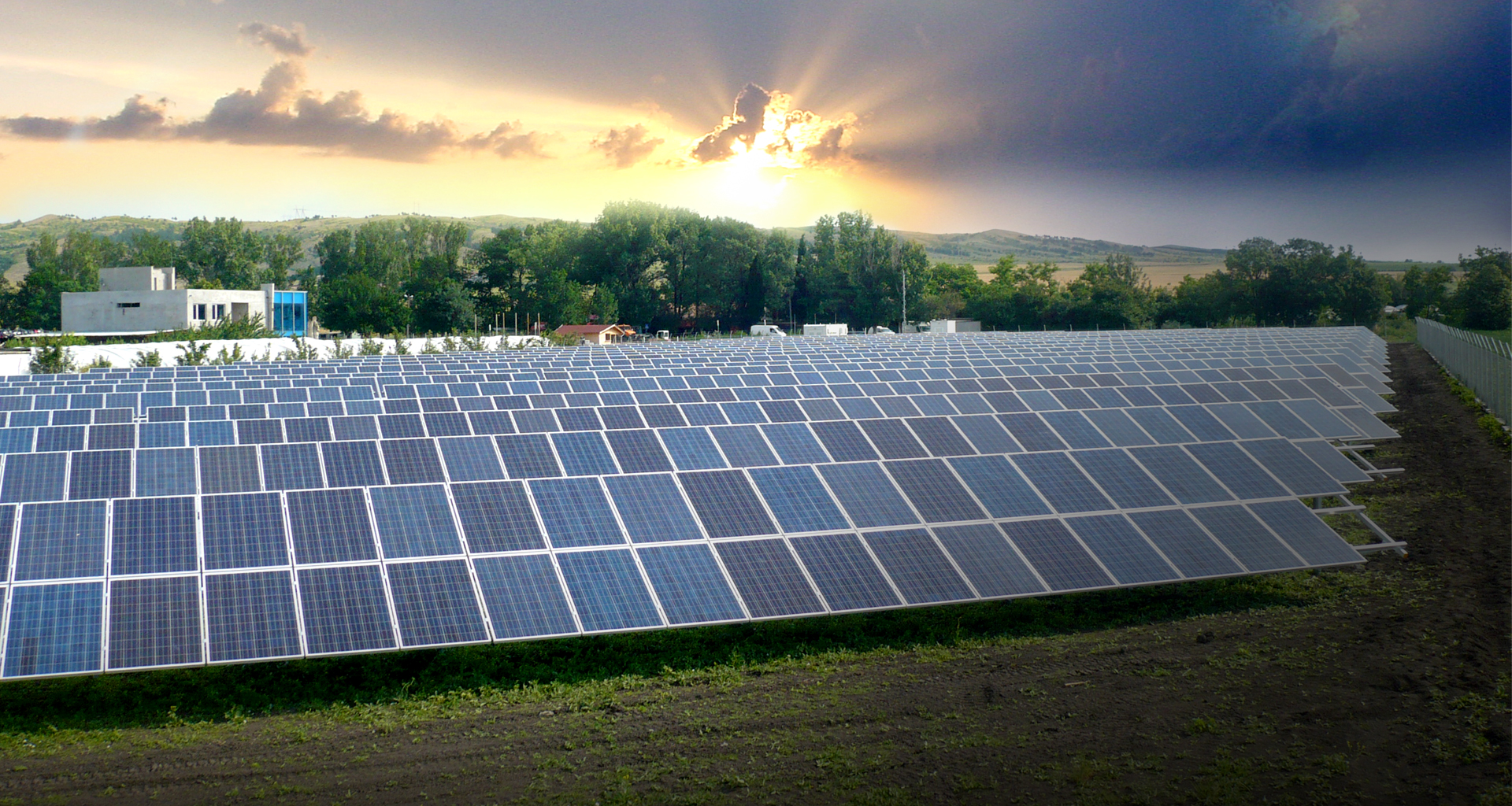
Solar power installation near Aytos

Bulgaria has a high potential for solar irradiation, especially in the southern regions of the nation. In the mid 2020s, solar energy has become the most dynamic component of Bulgaria's energy transition. Following a period of exponential growth between 2022 and 2025, the total installed photovoltaic (PV) capacity reached approximately 6 GW by the end of 2025, effectively tripling its 2020 capacity in just three years. This rapid expansion has positioned Bulgaria as one of the fastest-growing solar markets in Europe, with solar power now contributing roughly 14% to 15% of the national electricity generation. For the first time in Bulgaria, albeit for a few hours in May 2023, photovoltaics produced more electricity than nuclear and thermal power plants, providing 31% of the electricity production. There is a trend of many companies installing solar panels of own to reduce buying electricity from the grid, with a similar trend on the rise for domestic use as well.

Some of the largest solar parks include Apriltsi (300 MW) in Pazardzhik Province, Tenevo (238 MW) in Yambol Province, Dalgo Pole (207 MW) in Plovdiv Province and Verila (123 MW) in Kyustendil Province.

Bulgaria is also rapidly increasing its battery energy storage capacity, from about 200 MWh in 2024 to nearly 2500 MWh in 2025, or a 1100% growth, making it one EU's most dynamic markets in the sector. The capacity is expected to increase four to five times by 2026, with over 10,000 MWh of batteries being built in the country, financed by the National Recovery and Sustainability Plan. That investment allows cheap solar electricity to be stored during the day and used in the evening when demand is strongest.

==== Wind power ====
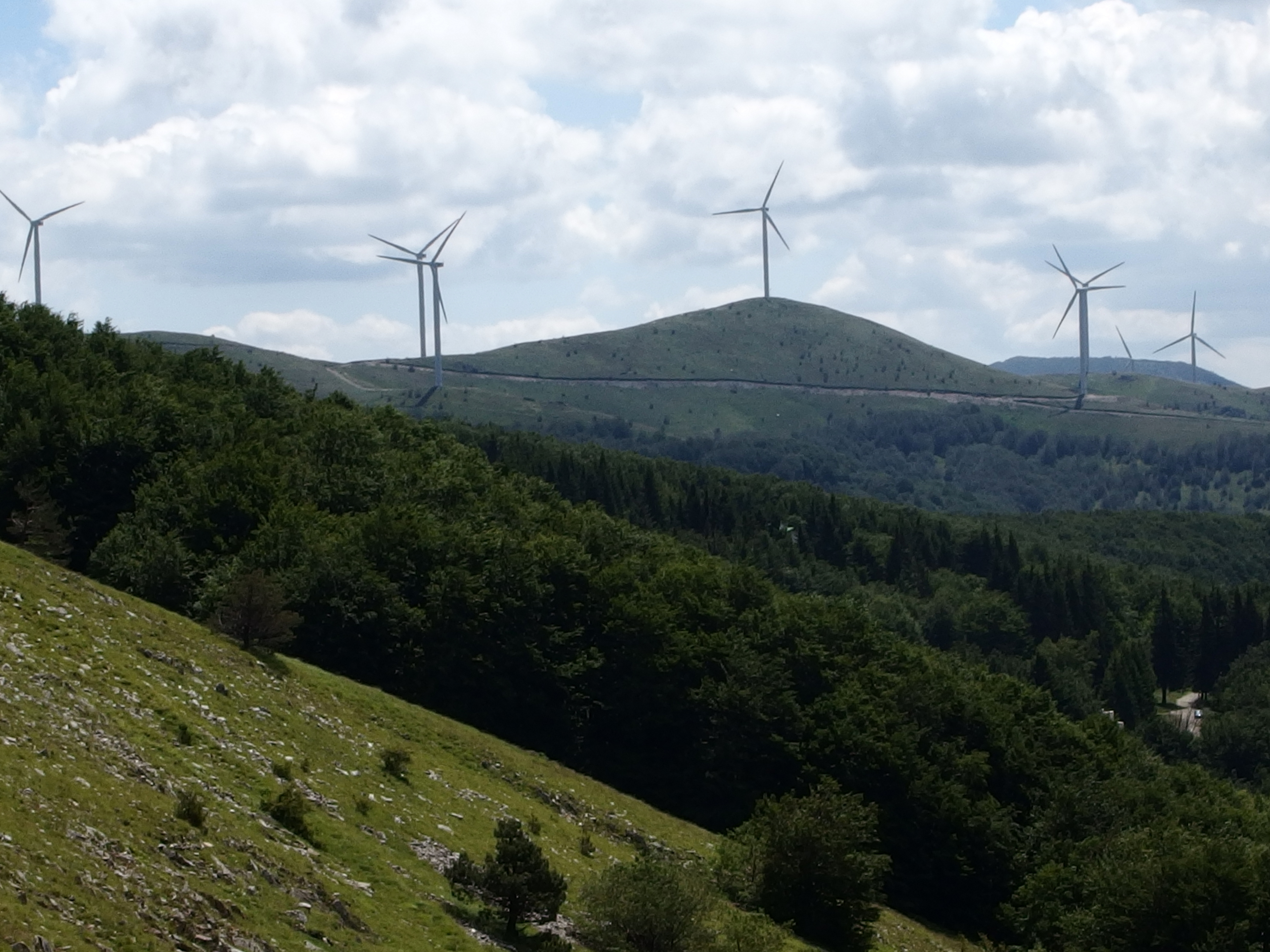
Wind turbines at Buzludzha, Balkan Mountains

Wind energy in Bulgaria has a significant technical potential, reaching some 3.8 GW to 4.2 GW for onshore projects. As of 2026, the country has an installed wind capacity of 710 MW, a figure that has remained relatively unchanged since 2012. As of 2026 it generated 1.38 TWh of electricity, or 3.44% of the total supply nationwide.

The first significant wind energy boom occurred between 2008 and 2012, driven by generous feed-in tariffs. That period saw the establishment of the country's largest facilities, primarily in the wind-rich Northeastern Planning Region near the Black Sea coast, as well as in the eastern Balkan Mountains. The largest one, the 156 MW Saint Nikola Wind Farm near the town of Kavarna, was constructed in 2009 and accounts for more than 20% of the total installed capacity. Under the updated 2025 National Energy and Climate Plan, Bulgaria aims to double its wind capacity to 1,640 MW by 2040 to meet European Union decarbonization targets. It is estimated that after 2025, the role of wind energy in renewable electricity generation will become increasingly important, with the onshore share of electricity from renewable sources expected to reach 13.7% in 2025 and 21.7% in 2030.

In addition, there is a 132 GW of technical offshore wind potential in the Bulgarian Black Sea sector, of which 26 GW can be utilized in accessible territories with currently available technology. As of 2025 the country is adopting legislative measures to regulate the exploration and exploitation of that potential. In 2024, Bulgaria, Romania and Greece signed an agreement to promote joint initiatives in the field of offshore wind generation.

==== Hydroelectric ====
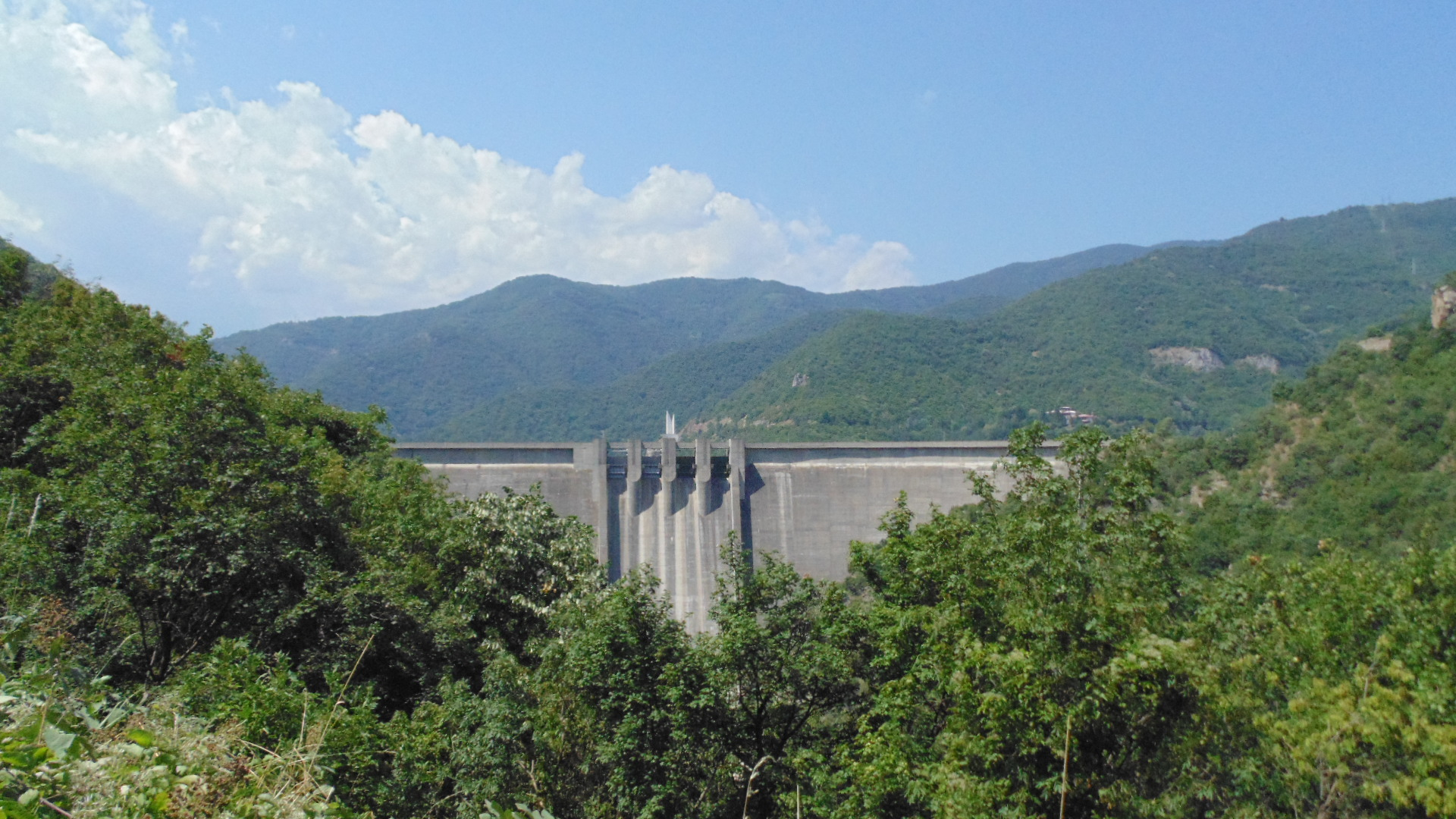
Vacha Dam on the Dospat–Vacha Hydropower Cascade

Hydropower has traditionally been a leading renewable source in the national energy mix. However, its share had been decreasing in favour of wind and especially solar power, with the latter taking the leading position as a renewable energy source in 2025. Hydropower share in the total electricity generation has fallen from over 10% in the early 2020s to 6.5% in 2025. The first hydropower plants in Bulgaria were constructed in the late 19th and early 20th century. The largest facilities were commissioned during the massive industrialization in the 1950s and 1960s. Most hydropower plants are owned by NEK EAD and located in the mountain ranges of Rhodope and Rila. The total installed capacity of the NEK EAD-owned HPPs is 2,737 MW. They are grouped in four main hydropower cascades that include several HPPs, dams and other facilities each — Belmeken–Sestrimo–Chaira (1,599 MW) in eastern Rila and the western Rhodopes, Dospat–Vacha (500 MW) in the western Rhodopes, Arda (325 MW) in the eastern Rhodopes and Batak (254 MW) in the western Rhodopes. All of these are located in the Maritsa river drainage, though water is also collected from neighbouring basins, such as those of the Mesta and the Struma via gathering derivations and tunnels.

Beyond power generation, the national hydroelectric infrastructure plays a critical balancing role, stabilizing the national grid against the volatility of newer solar and wind installations, as well as in periods of peak demand. There are three operational pumped storage hydro power plants, including the Chaira PSHPP (864 MW) — the largest in Southeastern Europe, with an important function to balance short-term consumption changes or shortages in the national grid. There are plans to construct several more PSHPPs, with ten sites being surveyed, mostly in the Rhodope Mountains.

=== Nuclear power ===
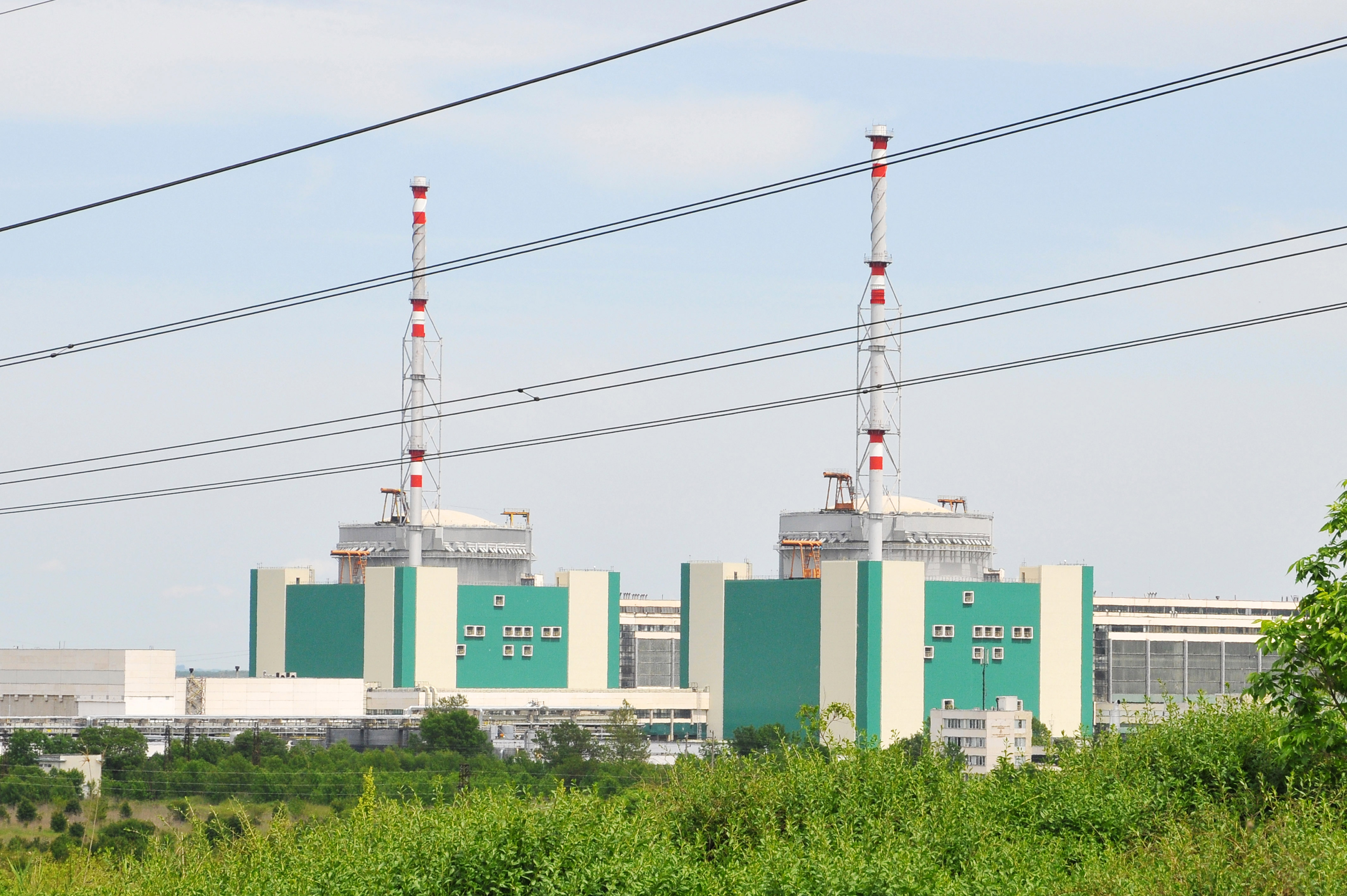
Kozloduy Nuclear Power Plant is the largest power plant of Bulgaria.

Nuclear energy is a cornerstone of the Bulgarian energy system, providing a stable, low-carbon source of baseload electricity. The decision to pursue nuclear electricity production was adopted in 1956. The first nuclear research reactor was inaugurated in 1961 in the capital Sofia. The construction of the first commercial units began in 1966 at the Kozloduy Nuclear Power Plant, situated along the Danube in northwestern Bulgaria. The power plant was inaugurated in 1974 and has since been the only operational nuclear generating facility in the country. It reached a peak capacity of 3,760 MW in six reactors in the 1990s and early 2000s. By 2006 the first four reactors were decommissioned, leaving the site with two operational reactors with an installed capacity of 2,000 MW. As of 2023, it produces 16.2 TWh of electricity, or approximately 40% of the total generation, and is the country's lowest-cost electricity producer. Following the general EU shift towards reducing Russian energy dependence, in 2022 Bulgaria has signed a contract with Westinghouse Electric Company to provide nuclear fuel, aiming a full transition from Russian fuel by 2027.

In 1981 the government approved the construction of the Belene Nuclear Power Plant with a planned capacity of 2,000 MW. It construction was aborted 1991 due to lack of funds, following the economic difficulties during the early years of the transition to democracy. The discourse for the completion of the project has been revived by several governments since 2000. The 2013 Bulgarian nuclear power referendum saw over 60% approval for its completion. In 2023 it was decided to build new reactors at the site in Kozloduy.

In 2023, the government contracted the US-based Westinghouse Electric Company to build two new reactors at Kozloduy Nuclear Power Plant of 1,250 MW each, with a target of a target for Unit 7 to be operational in 2035 and Unit 8 in 2037. Thus, by 2040 the country's installed nuclear capacity is projected to increase by 2,500 MW, as per the 2025 National Energy and Climate Plan.

== Heating ==
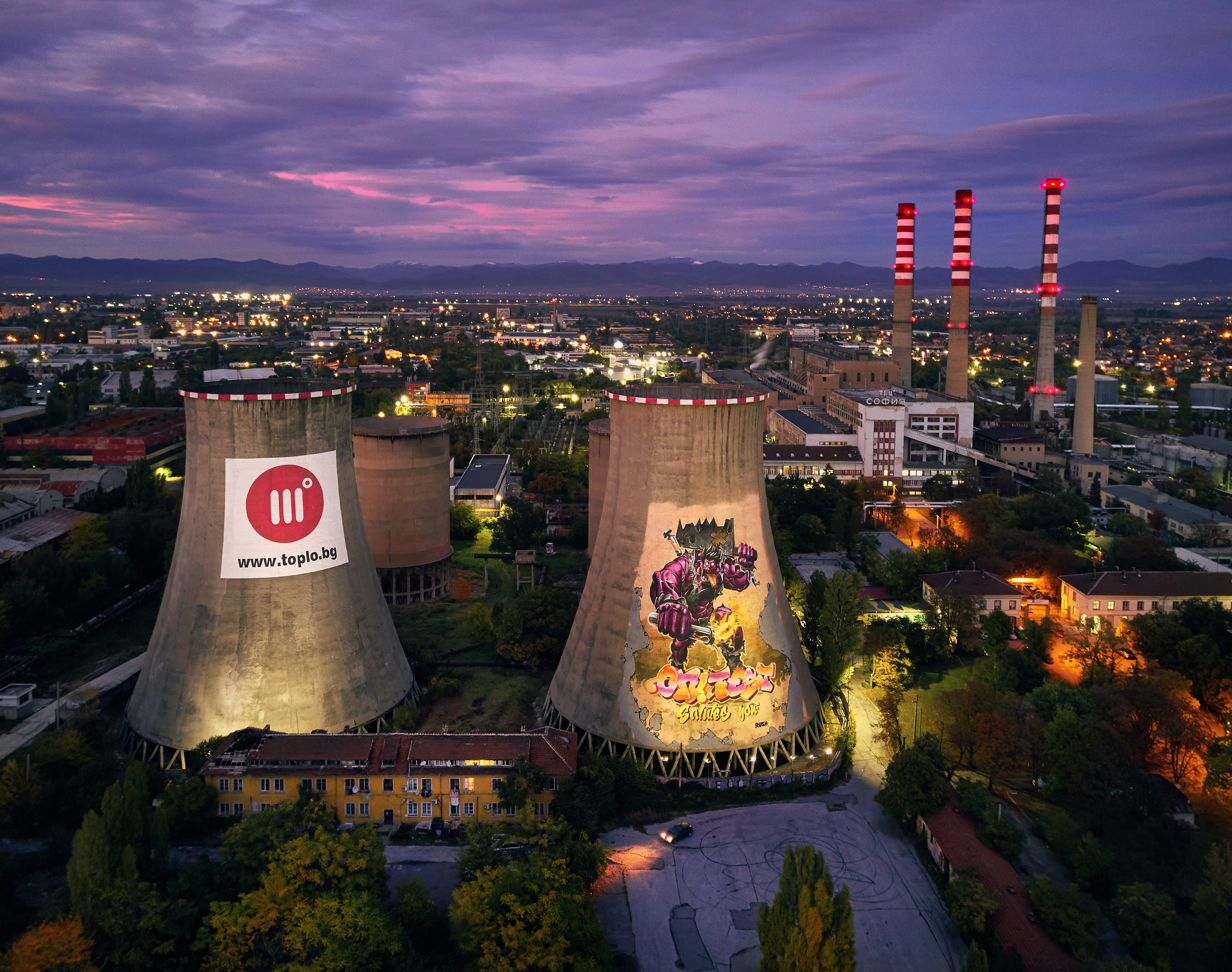
Sofia Power Plant, a heating power plant of Toplofikatsiya Sofia

The heating sector in Bulgaria is shaped by historical central planning, geographical divides between urban and rural populations, and a significant challenge with energy poverty. As of 2019 solid fuels are the most common source, accounting for approximately 52.6% of final energy consumption for heating, followed by electricity with 38.5%, and natural gas for district heating with 6.5%. Burning wood and coal for home heating is a major cause of chronic illnesses and excess deaths in the country. However, while in rural villages, up to 95–96% of households use wood and coal, in urban areas electricity and central heating are the leading source. By 2023, as many as 71% of households were utilizing some form of electric heating, including air conditioners and radiators, a massive increase from 29% in 2011. About 20% of the population has access to district heating, the dominant company being Toplofikatsiya Sofia, which is the oldest and the largest one in the Balkans with over 430,000 clients. Geothermal heating of some schools is being trialled.

As part of the National Recovery and Resilience Plan, Bulgaria has taken measures to reduce residential use of solid fuels by providing grants for energy efficient appliances, photovoltaic systems and solar collectors for own consumption, as well as pushing for energy efficiency and renovation of residential buildings.

== Energy transit and infrastructure ==
Bulgarian gas infrastructure map

In 2025, Bulgaria had 3,276 km of natural gas pipelines that includes both national and transit transmission network, supported by 11 compressor stations with a total installed capacity of about 400 MW, managed by Bulgargaz and Bulgartransgaz. There are also 345 km of oil pipelines, and 378 km of pipelines for refined products. Major operational transnational transit gas pipelines include Balkan Stream, and extension of TurkStream that transits Russian gas from Turkey to Serbia and Hungary, and the Trans-Balkan pipeline linking Ukraine and Turkey via Bulgaria. Several major projects have been canceled or aborted, including South Stream and the Nabucco pipeline. Another suspended project is the Burgas–Alexandroupoli oil pipeline that envisaged transportation of Russian and Caspian oil from the Bulgarian Black Sea port of Burgas to the Greek Aegean port of Alexandroupoli.

The Russian annexation of Crimea in 2014 and its invasion of Ukraine in 2022 accelerated the completion of several vital interconnectors to diversify its sources away from Russia. The Gas Interconnector Greece–Bulgaria was commission in 2022, followed in 2023 by the completion of the interconnector with Serbia. Bulgaria is on the final stages of completing the construction of the Vertical Gas Corridor on its territory with the interconnection points Kulata–Sidirokastro to Greece and Kardam–Negru Vodă to Romania expected to be inaugurated by the end of 2026. The project will facilitate LNG transit of up to 10 billion cubic meters from Greece to Ukraine and countries in Central and Eastern Europe.

== See also ==
- Economy of Bulgaria
- Electricity sector in Bulgaria
- Nuclear power in Bulgaria
