= Electricity sector in Bulgaria =

Electricity sector of Bulgaria
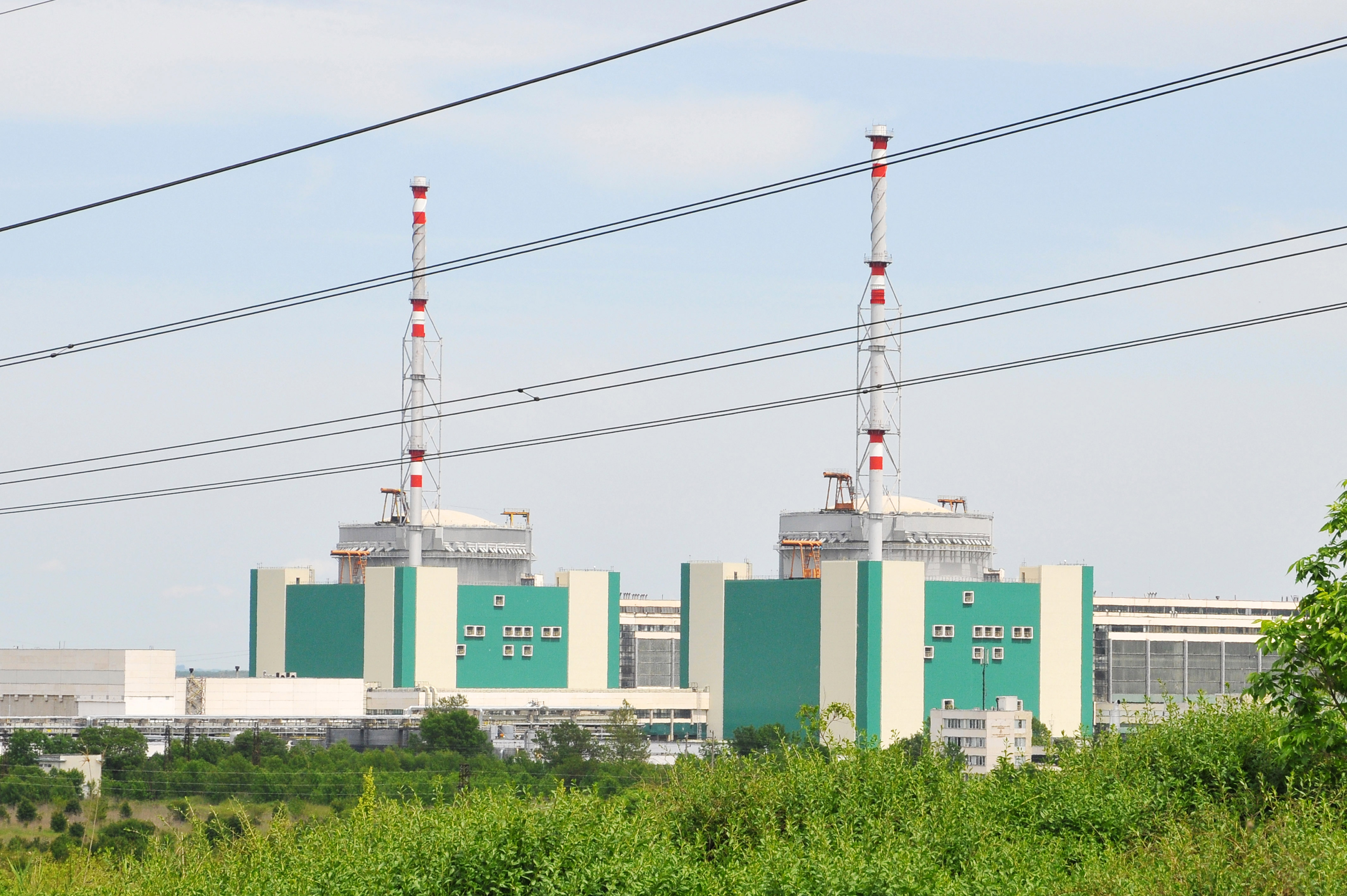
- Kozloduy Nuclear Power Plant is the largest power plant in Bulgaria

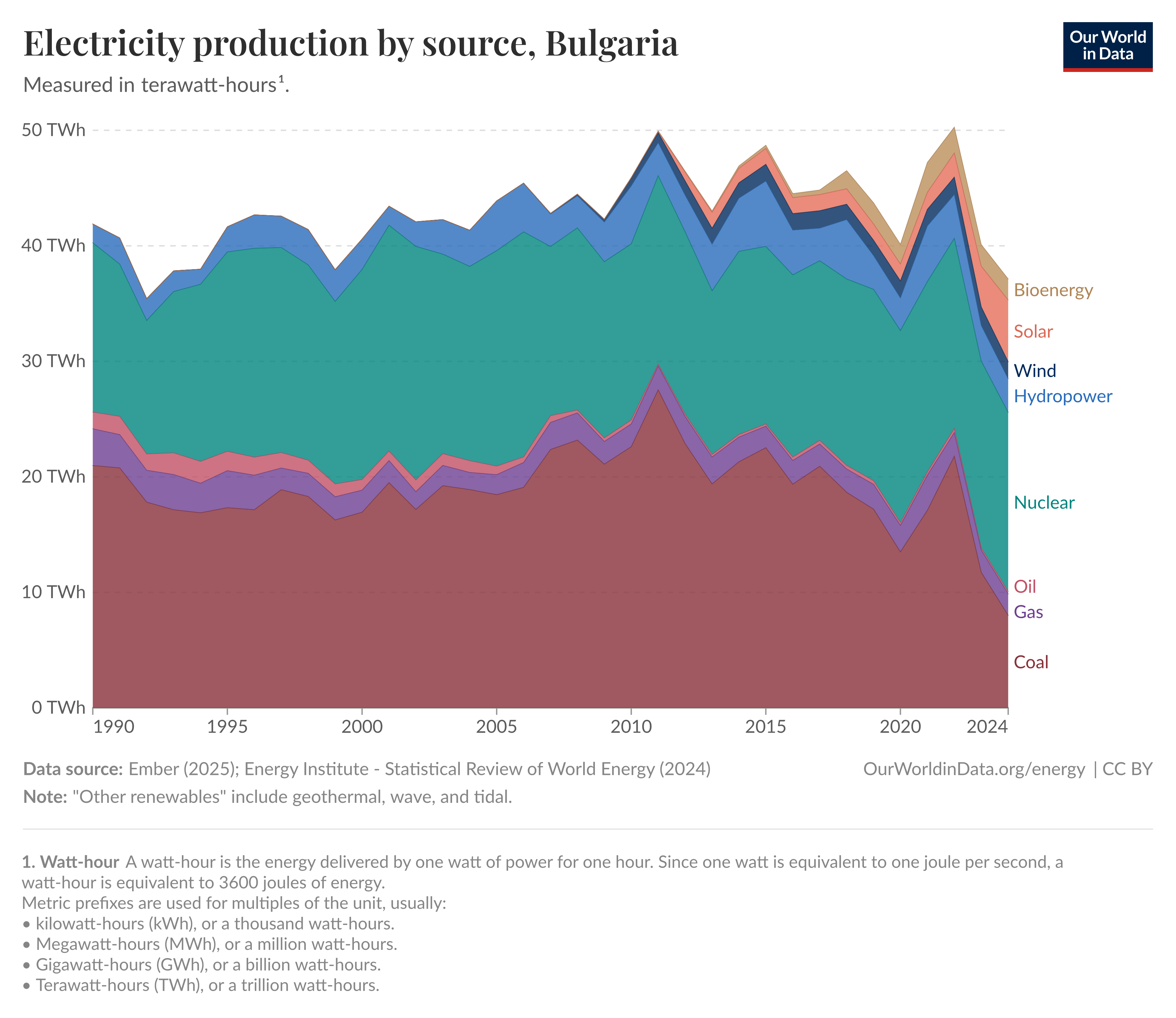
Electricity production by source

The electricity sector in Bulgaria is an important part of energy in Bulgaria. Nuclear is the largest source of power followed by coal and solar. The grid needs modernisation.

== Generation ==
Location of the major power plants in Bulgaria

=== Nuclear ===
Nuclear power plants in Bulgaria (view)
Active plants
Unfinished/future plants

Nuclear power generates about a third of electricity in Bulgaria. Bulgaria's first commercial nuclear reactor began operation in 1974. The Kozloduy NPP operates two pressurized water reactors with a total output of 1906 MW. This makes Bulgaria the 21st-largest user of nuclear power in the world. Construction of the Belene Nuclear Power Plant was officially terminated in March 2012, and a thermal powerplant was supposed to be built on the site. Efforts in May 2018 to restart the Belene project were unsuccessful. As of 2022, Bulgaria plans to construct new reactors at the existing Kozloduy site, and at Belene.

Bulgaria has the Kozloduy Nuclear Power Plant with two pressurized water reactors (together 2000 MW net). Four old and unsafe VVER-440/230 reactors (4 x 408 MW net) were taken off-line in 2004 and 2007). The two active reactors cover almost half of Bulgaria's electricity demand.

Bulgaria has two operational reactors and four that have been closed down prior to 2006. The two operational reactors have a capacity of 2 GW in total. In 2020 nuclear energy produced 16.6 TWh, which was 41% of Bulgaria's electricity generation.

In 2023, US based Westinghouse Electric Company are in the planning process with Kozloduy NPP-Newbuild to build the first of four new reactors in Bulgaria.

=== Coal ===
Some power stations are very dirty, and in 2023 one was found guilty of excess sulphur dioxide air pollution, which might lead to court cases against others.

In early 2023 the government attempted to postpone Bulgaria's EU commitment to reduce greenhouse gas emissions by 10% that year, because it did not want to close any coal-fired power stations.

Fossil fuel subsidy of coal power is expected to end by 2025. Bulgaria aims to phase out coal power (which is low quality lignite) by 2038 or earlier. The Center for Research on Energy and Clean Air says that an earlier phase out would save many lives and much money.

=== Hydro ===
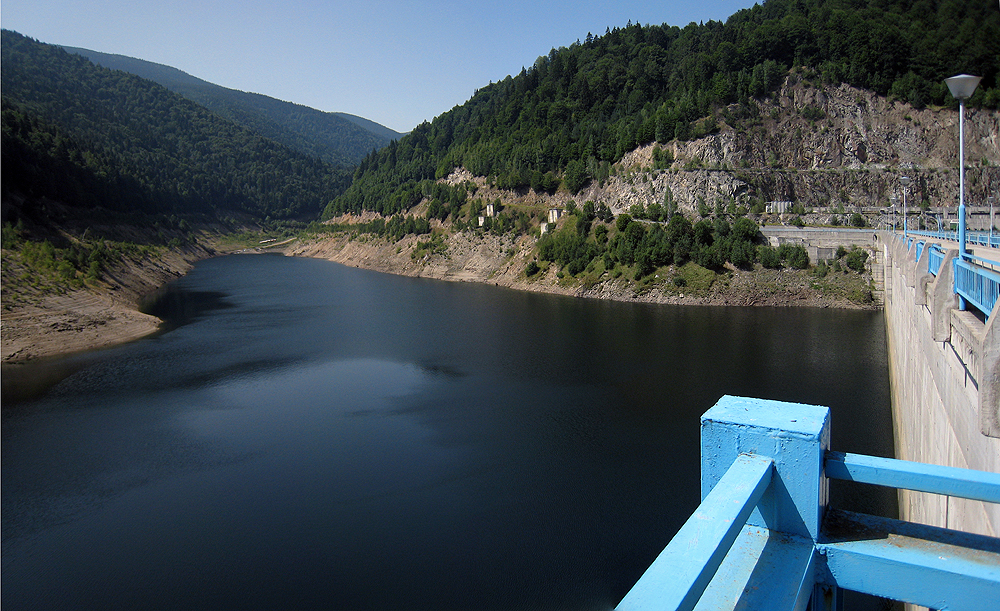
The dam of Chaira Hydro Power Plant, the largest in Bulgaria

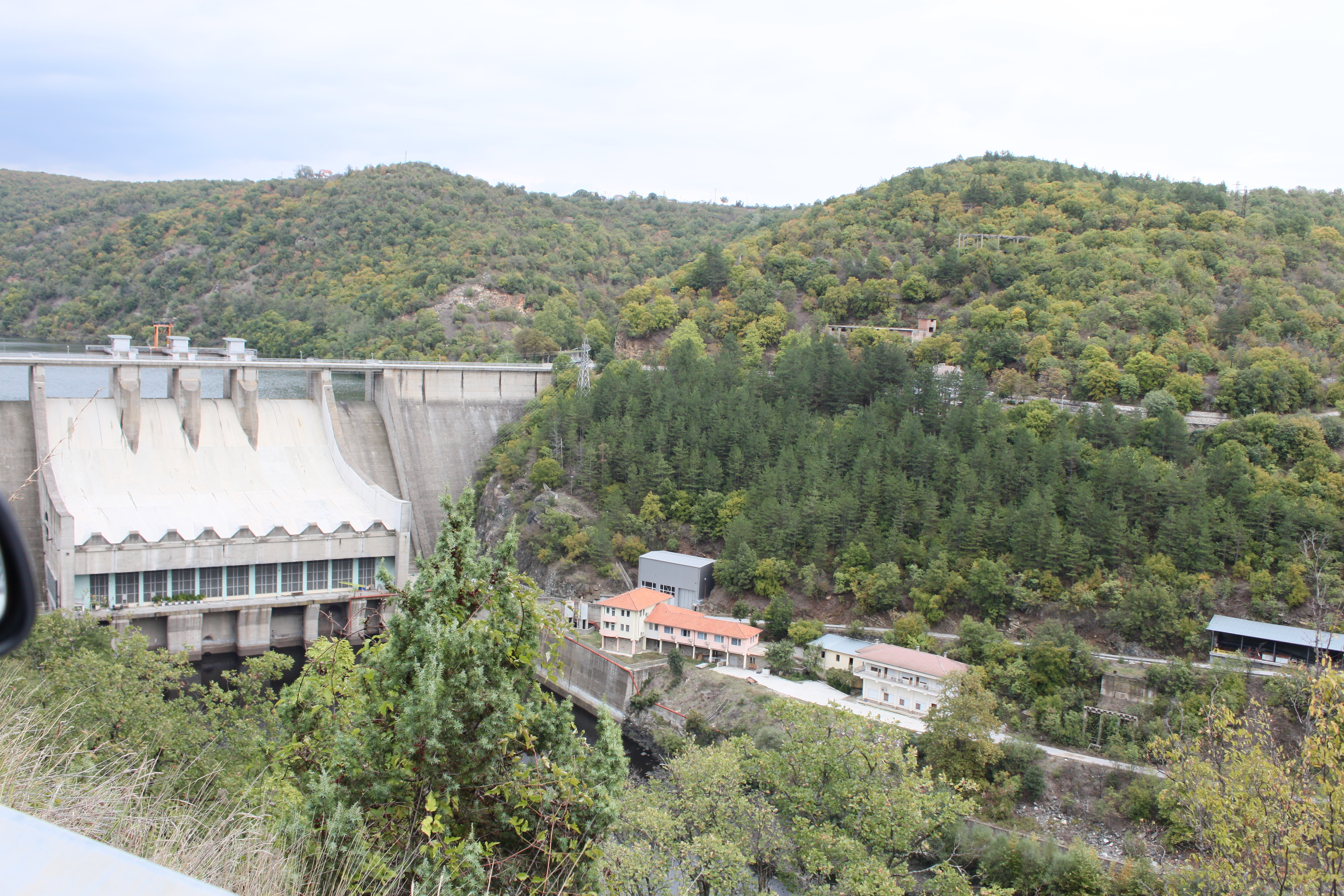
Ivaylovgrad Dam

In 2021, hydroelectricity generated 11% of Bulgaria's electricity. As of 2020, the country's total installed electricity capacity was approximately 12,839 MW, with hydropower contributing 25%, or 3,213 MW.

=== Solar ===
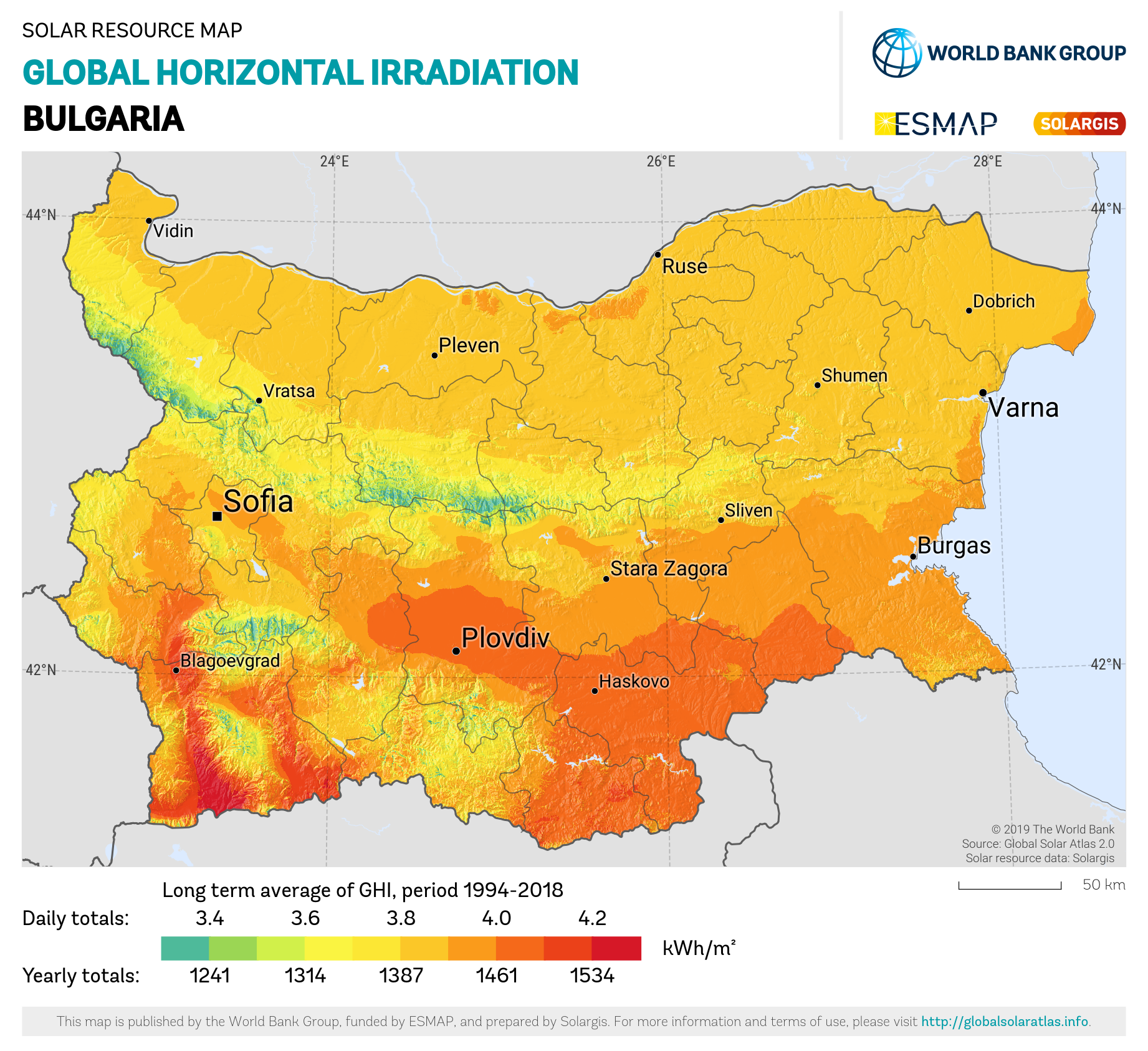
Solar irradiation map of Bulgaria

Solar power generated 12% of Bulgaria's electricity in 2023.

By the end of 2020 about 1 GW of solar PV had been installed. It has been estimated that there is potential for at least another 4 GW by 2030.

By the end of 2024 about 3.9 GW of solar had been installed.

Bulgaria has a high potential for solar irradiation, especially in the southern regions of the nation. Solar plants are rapidly increasing — from a total of 100 MW of solar power installed capacity in 2011, as of 2023, Bulgaria has more than 2,400 MW, of them 600 MW were added in 2022. The capacity is set to reach 3,000 MW. The largest solar parks are Dalgo Pole (207 MW) in Plovdiv Province and Verila (123 MW) in Kyustendil Province. There is a trend of many companies installing solar panels of own to reduce buying electricity from the grid, with a similar trend on the rise for domestic use as well. For the first time in Bulgaria, albeit for a few hours in May 2023, photovoltaics produced more electricity than nuclear power plants and thermal power plants, providing 31% of the electricity production.

Europe's (at the time) largest grid battery at 124 MW / 496 MWh opened at the 106/86 MW solar park in Lovech in May 2025. A 69 MW section at the Tenevo 238 MW solar park opened in 2025, with 65 MW / 260 MWh of a planned 315 MW / 760 MWh battery energy storage system. A 600 MWh battery opened in Burgas in 2026.

=== Wind ===
Wind power generated 2% of electricity in Bulgaria in 2023. By the end of 2020 almost 1 GW of onshore wind power had been installed. It has been estimated that there is potential for at least another 2 GW by 2030. The total wind power grid-connected capacity in Bulgaria was 702 MW as of 2023.

An energy island in the Black Sea has been suggested for joint development with wind power in Romania.

== Transmission, distribution and storage ==
As of 2025 the grid needs modernisation. It has been suggested that more connections with other countries would stabilize and reduce prices.

== Consumption ==
Bulgaria consumes about 35 TWh of electricity per year, and some is exported. The residential sector is the largest consumer, followed by industry then services.

== Market and regulation ==
According to the Center for the Study of Democracy the coal industry benefits oligarchs.
