= Delyan Dobrev =

Bulgarian politician

- Делян Добрев
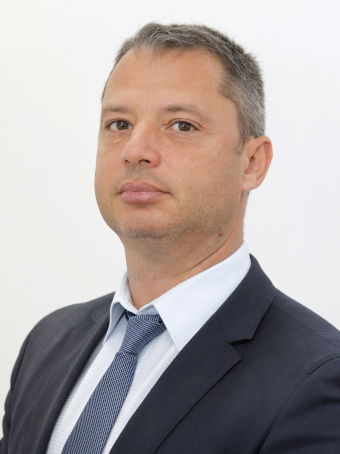

Member of the National Assembly
- Incumbent
- Assumed office 15 April 2021
- Constituency: 29th MMC - Haskovo
- In office 21 May 2013 – 10 April 2019
- Constituency: 14th MMC - Pernik (2013-2014); 29th MMC - Haskovo (2014-2019)
- In office 14 July 2009 – 19 May 2011
- Constituency: 29th MMC - Haskovo

Minister of Economy, Energy and Tourism
- In office 21 March 2012 – 13 March 2013
- Prime Minister: Boyko Borisov
- Preceded by: Traycho Traykov
- Succeeded by: Assen Vassilev

Deputy Minister of Economy, Energy and Tourism
- In office 19 May 2011 – 21 March 2012
- Prime Minister: Boyko Borisov
- Minister: Traycho Traykov

Personal details
- Born: 14 May 1978 (age 48) Haskovo, Bulgaria
- Party: GERB
- Education: Wesleyan University (BEc); University of National and World Economy (MEc)
- Occupation: Economist; Politician

Delyan Dobrev (born 1978 in Haskovo) is a Bulgarian politician and member of the National Assembly (Bulgaria). He was the Deputy Bulgarian Minister of Economy and Energy under Traycho Traykov, succeeding him as Minister in March 2012 following an energy crisis in the country which included the termination of the Belene Nuclear Power Plant project.

Dobrev is in his ninth term as an MP from Citizens for European Development of Bulgaria, representing Haskovo region. He has consistently promoted legislation for energy independence. As of July 2023, he is the Chairman of the Committee on Energy in the National Assembly. Dobrev is also a member of the Executive Committee of the GERB party.

In November 2023, Dobrev held a lecture at the Atlantic Council in Washington DC, where he outlined the various ways in which Russian influence has permeated politics in Eastern Europe. Getting rid of such influences means cutting off Russian suppliers in the energy and military equipment sectors.

== Education ==
Dobrev graduated in economics in 2002 from Wesleyan University, Middletown, Connecticut in the United States. He then specialised [sic] in accounting and finance at the London School of Economics in 2005-2006.

== Ban on Russian nuclear technology ==
Dobrev is a vocal opponent of the use of Russian nuclear technology in Bulgaria and while in government in 2012, along with Minister of Finance Simeon Dyankov, adopted a ban on such technology, including the termination of the Belene Nuclear Power Plant. Prime Minister Boyko Borisov listed this ban among the main successes of his first government. In July 2023, Dobrev initiated a sale of the unused Russian nuclear equipment to Ukraine, through a resolution in parliament.

“After the start of the war in Ukraine, building a power plant with that equipment became [politically] impossible in Bulgaria. Ukraine needs the equipment that we have. It is a perfect match.”

== Ban on import of Russian oil ==
At Dobrev's initiative, in July 2023 and again in November 2023 the National Assembly (Bulgaria) started a process of imposing a ban on Russian oil imports to the Lukoil refinery near Burgas. Taking advantage of an exemption to the EU’s Russian oil ban, Bulgaria allowed millions of barrels of Russian oil to reach the Russian-owned refinery, which then exported various refined fuels abroad including to EU countries, according to an investigation by the NGO Global Witness, the think tanks Center for the Study of Democracy (Bulgaria) and Centre for Research on Energy and Clean Air and independent reporting by Politico.

"At the very least they should tighten the sanctions and tighten the derogation regime. But the most optimal thing to do is just to get rid of this derogation," said Delyan Dobrev.

== Off-shore exploration ==
France’s TotalEnergies energy company was granted an oil and gas exploration licence in 2012 to prospect for fossil fuels in Bulgaria’s economic area of the Black Sea. TotalEnergies won the tender in competition with ExxonMobil and United Kingdom’s Melrose Resources, which had - as of 2012 - three exploration licences for areas of Bulgaria’s Black Sea shelf.

"Gas extracted locally costs about 40 per cent lower than imports. This is our hope for diversification [of energy sources],” Dobrev said.

In 2023, the National Assembly (Bulgaria) decided to negotiate the option for the state to take a 20% stake in the consortium for the offshore drilling following the departure of one of the original partners.
