= Traycho Traykov =

Bulgarian politician (born 1970)

- Трайчо Трайков
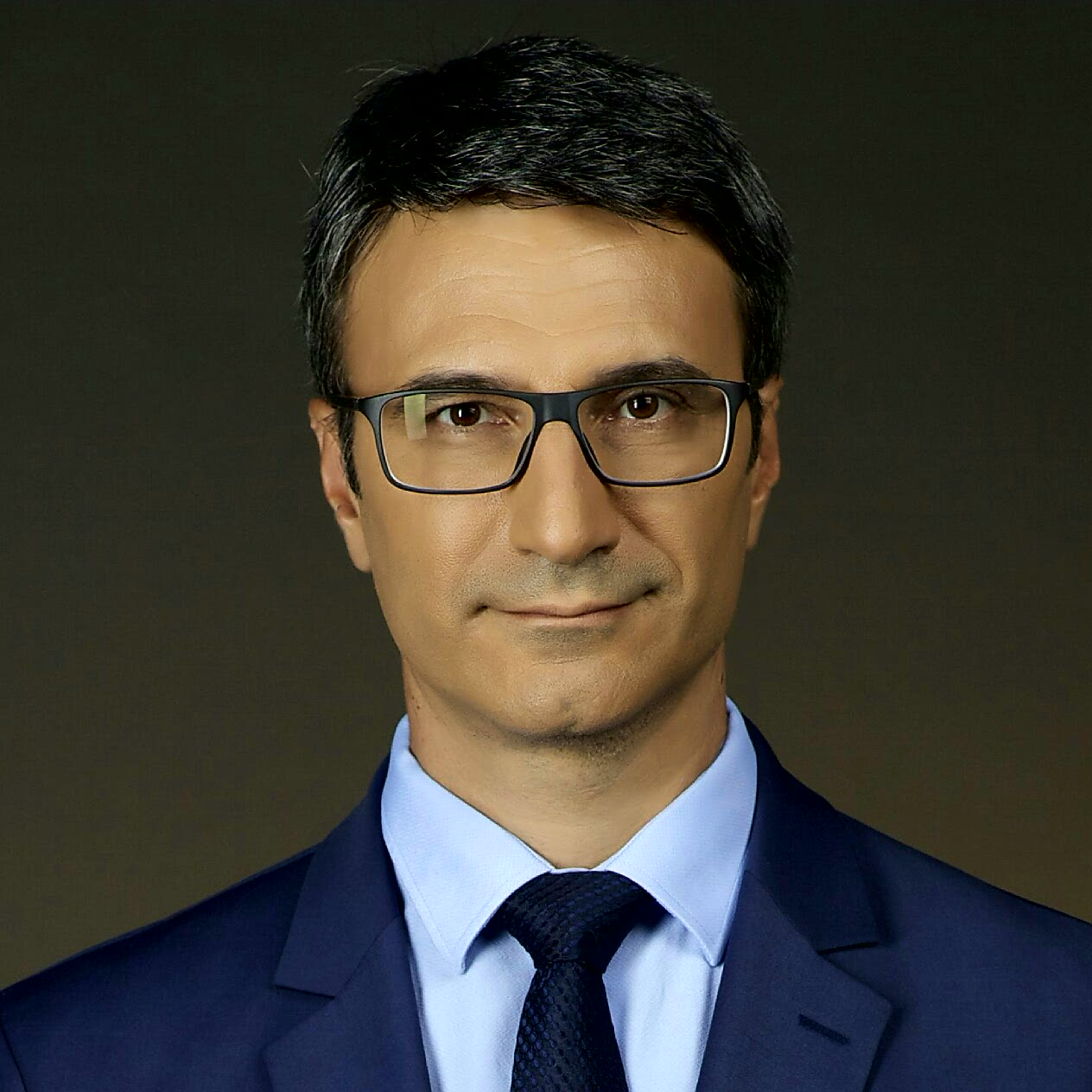
- Traykov in 2016

Mayor of Sredets
- Incumbent
- Assumed office 12 November 2019
- Preceded by: Mariya Achkova

Minister of Economy, Energy and Tourism
- In office 27 July 2009 – 21 March 2012
- Prime Minister: Boyko Borisov
- Preceded by: Rumen Ovcharov
- Succeeded by: Delyan Dobrev

Personal details
- Born: 19 April 1970 (age 56) Sofia, Bulgaria
- Party: Democratic Bulgaria
- Other political affiliations: Independent (until 2017)
- Education: First English Language School
- Alma mater: University of National and World Economy
- Occupation: Economist; Politician

Traycho Dimitrov Traykov (Bulgarian: Трайчо Димитров Трайков) is a Bulgarian politician. He was a Bulgarian Minister of Economy and Energy from 2009 to 2012. In February 2012 he launched an examination of dams in the south of the country after malfunction complaints. In March 2012 it was reported that he had been dismissed from his position allegedly for delaying work on energy projects; Bulgarian-language daily Bulgaria Dnes alleges that it was due to Belene Nuclear Power Plant specifically, a project which was terminated that month. Traykov himself "attributed the dismissal to his firm position in negotiations with Russia and his demands that Russia should cut the construction cost of the Belene plant, reduce gas prices by as much as 15 percent in a new supply contract and increase returns from the South Stream pipeline above 8 percent." He was succeeded by his former deputy, Delyan Dobrev.

== Minister of Economy ==
Traicho Traykov was Minister of Economy in the first Boyko Borisov government. He was part of the Reformist Bloc, together with Deputy Prime Minister Simeon Djankov, Minister for Infrastructure Rosen Plevneliev and the Minister of Environment Nona Karadzhova.

== Presidential Candidate ==
On 1 September 2016, the Reformist Bloc announced that Traycho Traykov would run in the 2016 Bulgarian presidential election. His running mate was General Sabi Sabev. During the whole election campaign, Traykov was targeted by media owned by Delyan Peevski who later got sanctioned under the US Magnitsky Act. Social activists were worried that the main purpose of the black PR campaign was to neutralize Traykov who appealed to progressive voters. Traykov eventually came in sixth in the presidential race with 5.87% of the votes. He received strong support from Bulgarians living in Germany.
