= Sofia Iztok Power Plant =

Thermal power plant

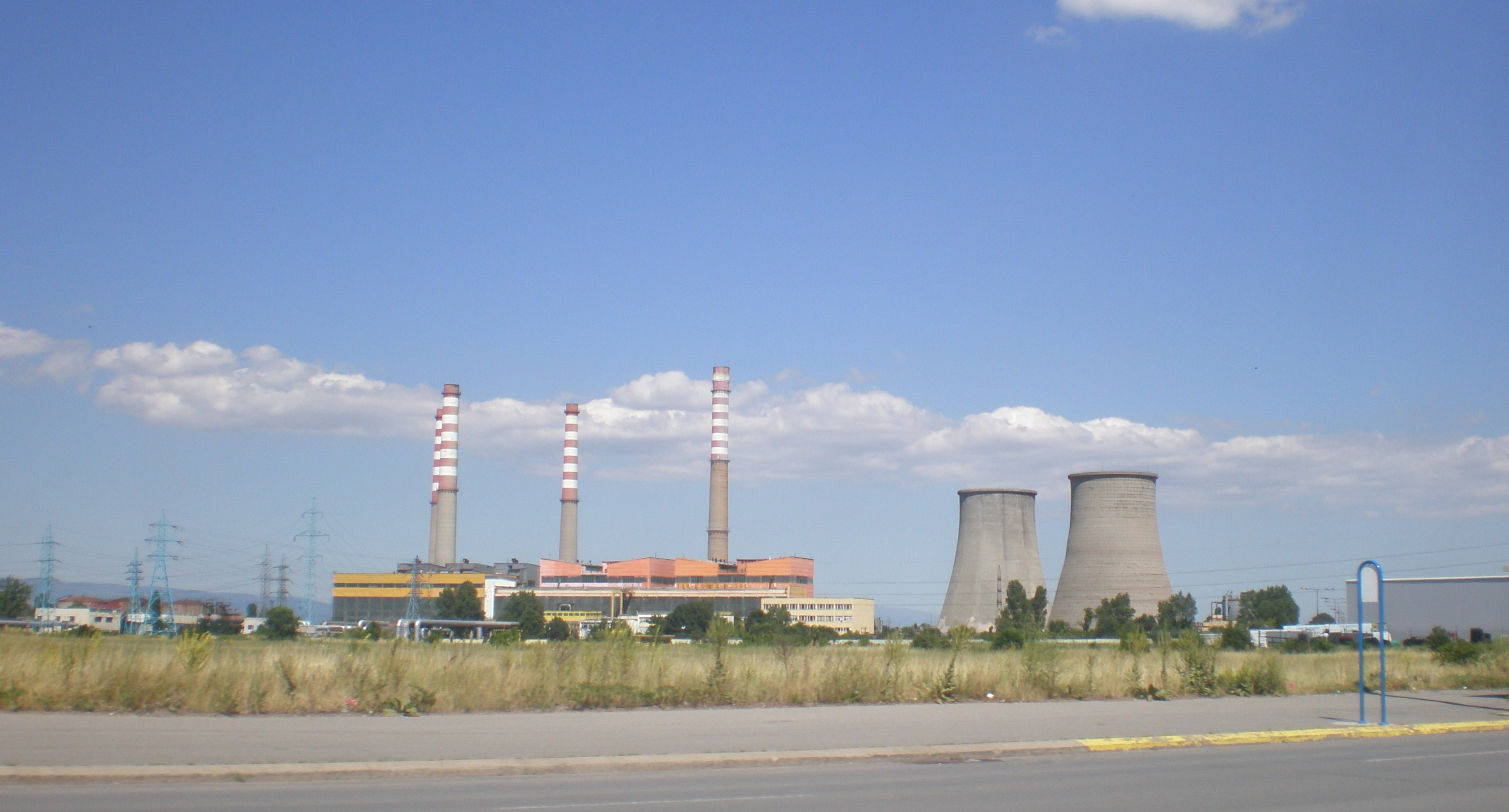
- Official name: ТЕЦ София Изток
- Country: Bulgaria
- Location: Sofia
- Coordinates: 42°39′4″N 23°25′2″E
- Status: Operational
- Commission date: 1964
- Owner: District Heating Sofia

Thermal power station
- Primary fuel: Natural gas
- Combined cycle?: 5
- Cogeneration?: Yes

Power generation
- Units operational: 5
- Nameplate capacity: 186 MW

External links
- Commons: Related media on Commons

Sofia Iztok Thermal Power Plant (Bulgarian: ТЕЦ София Изток) is a power plant situated at the eastern edge of the capital of Bulgaria, Sofia. It has an installed capacity of 186 MW.

== See also ==
- Energy in Bulgaria
