= Vera Sogoyan =

- Վերա Սողոյան
- Born: December 27, 1925; Artvin
- Died: August 14, 1986 (aged 60); Kyiv

Vera Soghomoni Sogoyan (Armenian: Վերա Սողոմոնի Սողոյան; December 27, 1925 – August 14, 1986) was an Armenian socialist realist painter.

Vera Sogoyan was born in Artvin, a town near the Black Sea in Turkey. Her family relocated to the USSR in 1928, likely due to persecution following the Armenian genocide.

She studied under N. Sharikov at Krasnadar and Grigorev at the Kyiv Art Institute. She was admitted to the Art Institute with a letter of recommendation from Martiros Saryan and graduated in 1952. At the Art Institute, she met and married fellow student Volodymyr Chernikov. They had one child, the neo-Symbolist painter Mykola Chernikov.

Following graduation, she was a successful painter in the Soviet-mandated socialist realism style, producing brightly colored scenes of families and children. The only solo exhibition of her work was posthumously held in 1989.

Vera Sogoyan died on 14 August 1986 in Kyiv.
