= 2013 Bulgarian nuclear power referendum =

- Should nuclear energy be developed in Bulgaria through construction of a new nuclear power plant?

Results
Choice	Votes	%
Yes	851,757	61.49%
No	533,526	38.51%
Valid votes	1,385,283	98.58%
Invalid or blank votes	19,903	1.42%
Total votes	1,405,186	100.00%
Registered voters/turnout	6,952,183	20.21%
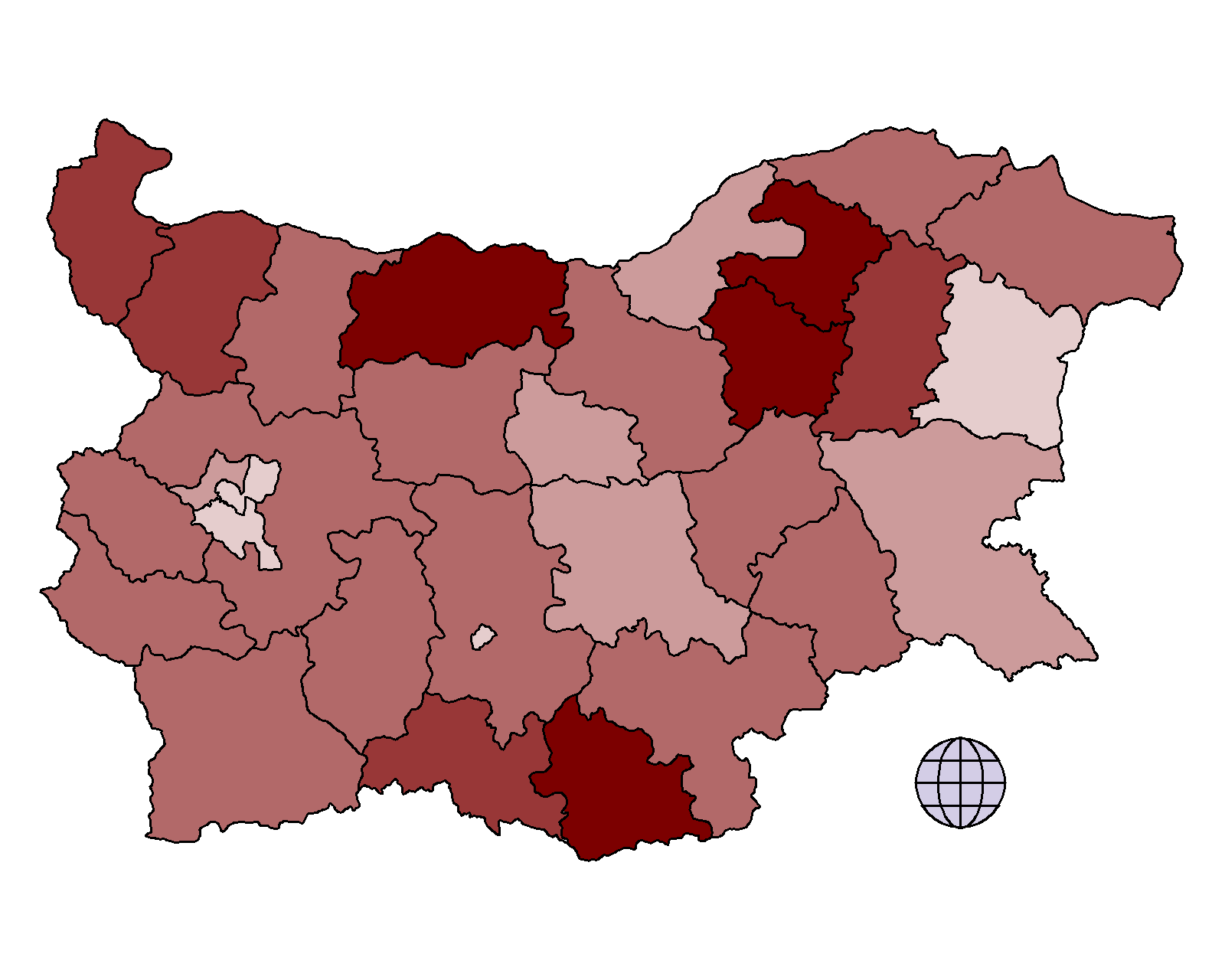
Yes: >70% 65-70% 60-65%	55-60% 50-55% 45-50%
Yes	No
Results of the 2013 Bulgarian nuclear power referendum

A referendum on building a new nuclear power plant was held in Bulgaria on 27 January 2013. Whilst it was not explicitly mentioned in the question, it was widely acknowledged that the referendum was about restarting construction at the Belene Nuclear Power Plant.

Although the proposal was approved in all 31 electoral divisions, turnout did not pass the required 60% threshold, resulting in the referendum becoming non-binding.

== Background ==
Construction on the Belene Nuclear Power Plant began in the 1980s, but was later frozen. The Bulgarian government was also forced to close four nuclear reactors as a condition of joining the European Union in 2007. In 2008 the Socialist Party government approved a contract for restarting construction. However, in March 2012 the GERB-led government scrapped plans to continue building the plant, claiming that it could not afford to invest a further €10 billion, after €1 billion had already been spent on the project, and that the electricity produced would be too expensive. According to some analysts however, electricity produced by Belene would be cheaper than current sources.

The Socialist Party claimed that it would only cost between €4 and €6 billion. They started a petition, and collected over 500,000 signatures, enough to force a referendum. Although the petition called for a referendum on the future of the Belene NPP project, the word "Belene" was subsequently removed from the question on insistence by the ruling GERB party.

== Electoral system ==
The referendum requires a turnout of at least 60% for the referendum to be valid. Voters were asked the question "Should nuclear energy be developed in Bulgaria through construction of a new nuclear power plant?"

== Campaign ==
Supporters of the plant argued that it would mean the country would not have to buy electricity from Romania and Turkey, whilst opponents have claimed that it would increase the country's energy dependence on Russia, as the Russian firm Atomstroyexport had been contracted to build the plant.

== Results ==
Choice	Votes	%
For	851,757	61.49
Against	533,526	38.51
Total	1,385,283	100.00
Valid votes	1,385,283	98.58
Invalid/blank votes	19,903	1.42
Total votes	1,405,186	100.00
Registered voters/turnout	6,952,183	20.21
Source: CEC

== See also ==
- Nuclear power in Bulgaria
