= Gas Interconnector Greece–Bulgaria =

Gas pipeline in Southeast Europe

Interconnector Greece–Bulgaria

Location
- Country: Greece; Bulgaria
- Direction: South–North
- Start: Komotini, Greece
- Passes through: Kardjali, Haskovo, Dimitrovgrad, Bulgaria
- To: Stara Zagora, Bulgaria

General information
- Type: Natural gas
- Partners: Bulgarian Energy Holding; IGI Poseidon (DEPA & Edison S.p.A.)
- Operator: ICGB AD
- Commissioned: 2022

Technical information
- Length: 182 km (113 mi)
- Maximum discharge: 3 billion cubic metres per annum (110×10^{9} cu ft/a)
- Diameter: 32 in (813 mm)
- Website: www.icgb.eu

Gas Interconnector Greece–Bulgaria is a natural gas pipeline from the Greek to the Bulgarian natural gas pipeline network. It became operational on 1 October 2022.

== Route ==
On 14 July 2009, Bulgarian Energy Holding signed an agreement with DEPA and Edison S.p.A. on setting up a company to construct and operate the branch pipeline Interconnector Greece-Bulgaria with a capacity of one billion cubic meters of gas per year. The pipeline will be 160 kilometres (99 mi) between Komotini and Stara Zagora in Bulgaria.

The capacity of the pipeline is to be 3 to 5 billion cubic metres per annum (110 to 180 billion cubic feet per annum) with reverse flow capability. The connecting points are to be Komotini, Greece and Stara Zagora, Bulgaria. The length of the pipeline is about 150 kilometres (93 mi) in Bulgaria and 30 kilometres (19 mi) in Greece. The pipe diameter is 813 millimetres (32.0 in), with an estimated cost between 200 and 250 million Euro to construct.

== Purpose ==
The project is in line with the joint EU strategy for market-based security of supply, which calls for bidirectional interconnection of national grids and specifically for the creation of a Southern Gas Corridor. Whereas the capacity of the gas interconnector project does not fully satisfy the capacity expected in the Southern Gas Corridor, it achieves diversification of sources of supply of natural gas to Bulgaria and helps the countries in the region get greater access to the global natural gas market; Azerbaijani natural gas has started to pass through the interconnector.

== Project development ==
On 14 July 2009, a Memorandum of understanding was signed between Bulgarian Energy Holding EAD, Edison (Italy) and DEPA, which defines the principles for the development and realization of the project. In January 2011, a joint company "ICGB" AD was registered by the same partners that will construct, own and operate the pipeline. The project took off in 2017. Construction works commenced in early 2020 and were completed in the third quarter of 2022. The interconnector is fully operational since October 1.

== Usage ==
In 2023 ICGB held the first annual auction for the interconnector capacity, with 80% of the current 3bcm capacity reserved for the 2024 year.

The ICGB pipe line is connected to the Alexandroupolis INGS which will become operational in March 2024.

In January 2024 Slovakia, Moldova and Ukraine have joined Bulgaria, North Macedonia, Romania, Serbia and Hungary as customers of gas shipped through the ICGB pipeline giving emphasis to the need for expansion of the pipeline from 3 to 5 billion cubic meters of gas.

== See also ==
- Energy in the European Union
- Energy in Greece
- Energy in Bulgaria
