= Sidi Boulbra =

Sidi Boulbra is a site that the Moroccan government has been considering building a nuclear plant since 1983. The site is located near the town of Sidi Ishaq, between Safi and Essaouira in the Essaouira province of Morocco.

== History ==
The Moroccan government has planned to build a nuclear plant in Sidi Boulbra since 1983 with assistance from the French Company for Nuclear Studies and Achievements. Agreements have also been concluded with the Atomic Energy Commission. The Moroccan nuclear program initially provides for the construction of 6,600 MW, then it will be reduced to a single reactor with a capacity of 900 MW by 2005–2007. From this perspective, the Mamoura Center for Nuclear Studies was equipped with an American research reactor in the early 2000s.

The site was approved by the International Atomic Energy Agency (IAEA) in December 2005. However, on May 29, 2006, Energy Minister Mohamed Boutaleb confirmed that "Morocco does not have a nuclear program and does not intend to build thermonuclear power plants to obtain its electricity needs." In March 2007 the Russian group Atomstroyexport asserted in a press release that "Moscow is entering international competition, which sees many multinational companies providing Rabat with the technology to build a nuclear complex."

In 2015, an IAEA delegation made an eight-day visit to assess Morocco's ability to operate its nuclear power plants. In 2016, Morocco considered incorporating nuclear energy into its energy mix by 2030, in order to reduce its dependence on energy. According to the Moroccan newspaper Akhbar Al-Youm, construction work began on the Boulbra site in June 2016.
