= Sofia Power Plant =

Power plant situated near the capital of Bulgaria, Sofia

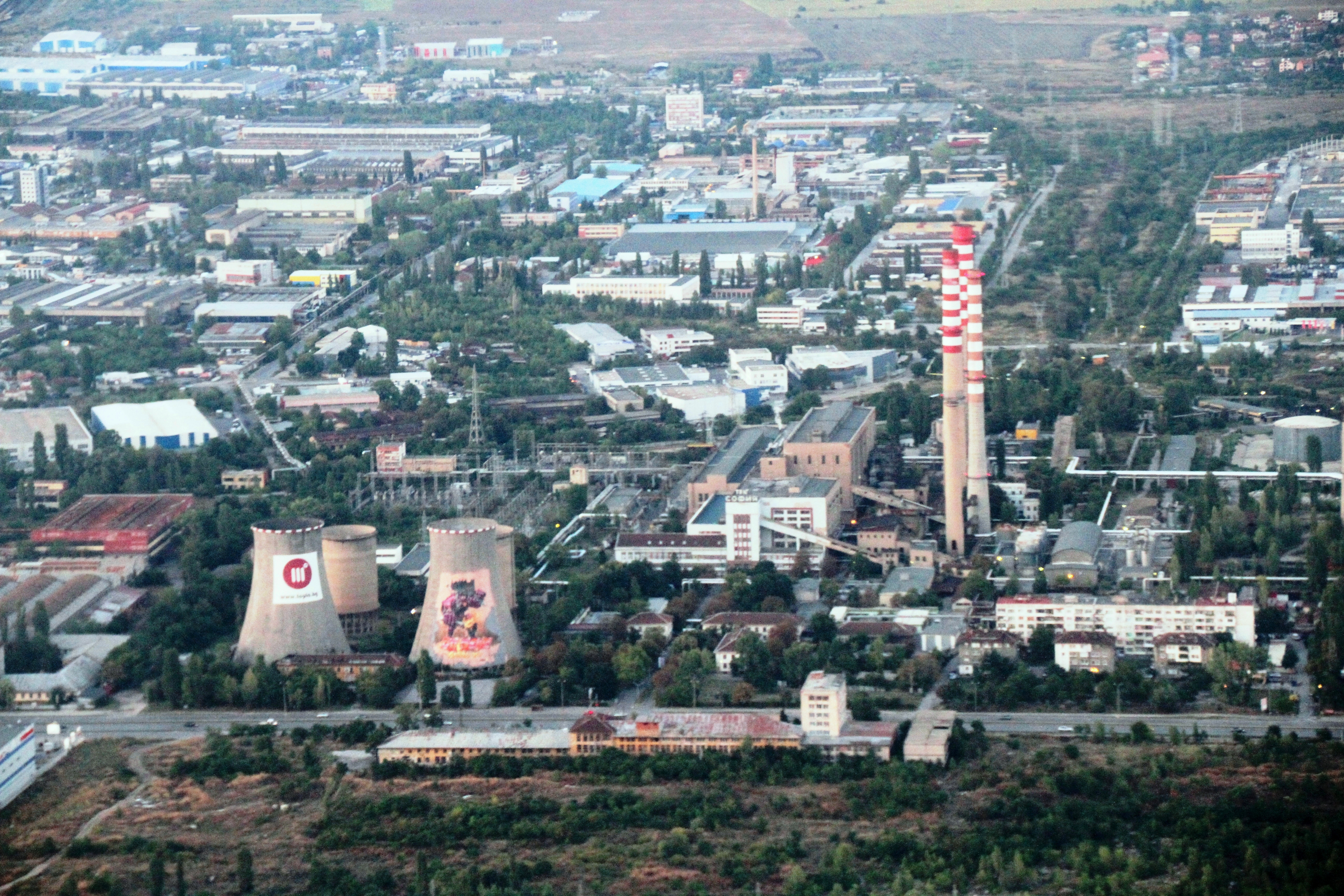
- Country: Bulgaria
- Location: Sofia
- Coordinates: 42°43′8″N 23°19′23″E
- Status: Operational
- Commission date: 22 March 1949
- Owner: Toplofikatsiya Sofia

Thermal power station
- Primary fuel: Natural gas
- Cogeneration?: Yes

Power generation
- Nameplate capacity: 125 MW

External links
- Commons: Related media on Commons

Sofia Thermal Power Plant (Bulgarian: ТЕЦ София) is a power plant situated near the capital of Bulgaria, Sofia. It has an installed capacity of 130 MW.

== See also ==
- Energy in Bulgaria
