= Neosymbolism =

Artistic movement

Neosymbolism is a movement current in the visual arts genre. Active in the movement are artists in the United States, Denmark, the Czech Republic, and Canada.

== Philosophy ==
The core philosophy of Neosymbolism, like that of its predecessor Symbolism, is the idea of "correspondences", the "emblematic order" of a world in which technology and the industrial reality have not yet drowned the forces of mysticism and belief. In a world where visual images exist to generate sales and revenue, Neosymbolist imagery attempts to preserve the relationship between image and the human soul. The imagery is necessarily representational rather than abstract. It borders on the narrative, but stops short of the commercial trap of illustration to convey an idea for profit. Artists like Norman Rockwell could qualify as Neosymbolist painters in that they adopt a social and cultural undercurrent and then convey it in terms of the cultural cliche—the image as representative of core aspects of the culture. The same is not true, however, of the generally accepted idea of commercial illustration which attempts more to influence cultural, political, and economic ideology than it tries to communicate an existential reality.

Neosymbolism is fairly well-hidden within the culture, with few references and almost no broad-based visibility. In 1988, Nick A_Demos published a book in two editions. This was the first visible sign of an idea underlying a Neosymbolist philosophy. A_Demos then developed this first book of Neosymbolism into paintings. He was also the first to use the word "Neosymbolism", thus coining it.

There has also been a separate group using the Neosymbolism name for the creation of an international collective representing a number of artists who share the goals of preserving the visual art of Symbolism (the foundation of the ideas associated with the term Neosymbolism) in its original and essential sense. This preservation, as opposed to the "non-sense" of various philosophies that have evolved since the late nineteenth century and have deviated from the core Symbolist philosophy.

The Neosymbolist movement was born spontaneously in numerous locations across the globe. Many groups use the word but also do not want to be limited to only this discipline. A group of Danish Neosymbolists defined their movement thus:

- Using Iconic language in their expressions
- Reproducing the inner experience of the outer world
- Examining the human experience and circumstance in today’s changing world
- Examining the underlying meaning of life
- Using media in conscious and innovative ways

The founder of the Canadian Neosymbolists, meanwhile, describes the foundations of their movement in Brief Summary of the Foundations of Canadian Neosymbolism, written by their founder, Gary F. Manzo.

- Using Symbolic language in our expressions, often derived from Dream Sequences and Archetypal Imagery as described by Carl Jung, and others involved with Mysticism, Alchemy, Depth Psychology and Philosophy.
- Depicting the inner experience of the outer world, in relationship to Self-Actualization and Depth Psychology and related fields of study.
- Examining the human experience and circumstance in today’s changing world, with the idea that mankind must “make friends with his animal nature” in order to achieve Wholeness of SELF in a contemporary world.
- Examining the underlying meaning of life, both from an historical perspective and its relevancy to the new age of Technology as well as New Age Psychology.
- Using mediums and techniques, in conscious, experimental and innovative ways, utilizing both traditional methods and contemporary cutting-edge techniques and technologies.

Another international Neosymbolist collective that began exhibiting as a group in 2001 has a simpler definition:

- The "exploration of the emotional, political, and spiritual themes of the rapidly changing culture of the late 20th and early 21st (century) through the use of symbols both personal and universal."

This perspective of the Neosymbolist movement can be seen as a reaction against abstraction, an attempt to weave artists’ intellectual and spiritual experiences into the fabric of their work. Furthermore, the Neosymbolists’ palette is not limited to the use of words and ancient symbols of ideas, even as these remain powerful tools of expression.

== Reviews ==
The exhibition history of these groups, including their collaborations with the Danish Neosymbolist collective, are documented in reviews in the following periodicals. More information about this group can also be found at www.neosymbolism.eu

- Sketch Book, the Artists’ Coalition of Austin Newsletter
- Pascale Vial, July 2001, "Neosymbolismus at Depot St. Gallery"
- Jacqueline May, May 7, 2004, Austin Chronicle, Vol 23, No. 26
- Gabriela Garbova - March 17, 2005, Olomoucky Den
- "The Exhibition of Neosymbolist Art", Austin Gazeta, October, 2006
- Af Michael Friis, November 22, 2006, "Symbol X i Rahuset", Vesterbro Bladet, Copenhagen, Denmark
- "Galerii Osadil Neosymbolismus", Dnes, January 5, 2007
- Vlasta Hrdilova, January 12, 2007, "Neosymboliste Vystavuji v Olomouci", Pravo
- Ondrej Grezdo, Octobra 14, 2008, "Americki vytarnici predstavili neosymbolizmus", Piestansky Tyzden
