= Toplofikatsiya Sofia =

Toplofikatsiya Sofia is the district heating company in Sofia, the capital of Bulgaria. It is the oldest and largest district heating network in Bulgaria (and, according to the company's website, on the Balkan Peninsula), brought into use in 1949 with the opening of the first combined heat and power plant – TEC Sofia.

Toplofikatsiya Sofia is a single-member JSC and holds a monopoly on heat distribution in the city. As of 2012, the company has a hot water and steam distribution network of over 950 km throughout the city ^{(slide 3)} and has over 430 000 clients.^{(p. 15)}

The company has four power stations – two cogeneration plants, and two heat-only boiler stations –

| Name | Heat energy capacity (MWt) | Heat energy output (2011) (MWth) | Electric capacity (MWe) | Electric output (2011) (MWeh) | Built | Notes |
|---|---|---|---|---|---|---|
| TEC Sofia | 1 790 | 1 170 000 | 125 | 315 000 | 1949 | - |
| TEC Sofia East | 2 010 | 1 860 000 | 186 | 650 000 | 1964 | - |
| OC Zemlyane | 580 | 930 000 | – | – | 1972 | - |
| OC Lyulin | 580 | 550 000 | – | – | 1977 | - |
| Total | 5 000 | 5 100 000 | 280 | 1 020 000 | – | - |

The company also has several temporary boiler stations throughout the city, which are usually only used during the winter months.

As of February 2013, part of the 2013 Bulgarian protests are aimed at the business model employed by Toplofikatsiya Sofia, with protesters complaining about high bills and lack of transparency in the company's practices.

== See also ==
- Energy in Bulgaria
