= Nuclear power in Bulgaria =

Nuclear power plants in Bulgaria (view)
Active plants
Unfinished/future plants

Nuclear power generates about a third of electricity in Bulgaria. Bulgaria's first commercial nuclear reactor began operation in 1974. The Kozloduy NPP operates two pressurized water reactors with a total output of 1906 MW. This makes Bulgaria the 21st-largest user of nuclear power in the world. Construction of the Belene Nuclear Power Plant was officially terminated in March 2012, and a thermal powerplant was supposed to be built on the site. Efforts in May 2018 to restart the Belene project were unsuccessful. As of 2022, Bulgaria plans to construct new reactors at the existing Kozloduy site, and at Belene.

Bulgaria has the Kozloduy Nuclear Power Plant with two pressurized water reactors (together 2000 MW net). Four old and unsafe VVER-440/230 reactors (4 x 408 MW net) were taken off-line in 2004 and 2007). The two active reactors cover almost half of Bulgaria's electricity demand.

Bulgaria has two operational reactors and four that have been closed down prior to 2006. The two operational reactors have a capacity of 2 GW in total. In 2025 nuclear energy produced 14707 GWh, which was 38% of Bulgaria's electricity generation.

In 2023, US based Westinghouse Electric Company are in the planning process with Kozloduy NPP-Newbuild to build the first of four new reactors in Bulgaria.

== Radioactive waste ==
Bulgaria has a state agency in charge of radioactive waste disposal. Under a 2002 agreement, Bulgaria pays Russia $620 thousand/ton to reprocess spent fuel. The country also spent €49 million to construct a new storage facility and had plans to build another facility by 2015 but it didn't happen as predicted.

== Reactors ==
Plant name	Unit No.	Type	Model	Status	Capacity (MW)	Begin building	Commercial operation	Closed
Kozloduy	1	PWR	VVER-440/V-230	Shut down	408	1 Apr 1970	28 Oct 1974	31 Dec 2002
Kozloduy	2	PWR	VVER-440/V-230	Shut down	408	1 Apr 1970	10 Nov 1975	31 Dec 2002
Kozloduy	3	PWR	VVER-440/V-230	Shut down	408	1 Oct 1973	20 Jan 1981	31 Dec 2006
Kozloduy	4	PWR	VVER-440/V-230	Shut down	408	1 Oct 1973	20 Jun 1982	31 Dec 2006
Kozloduy	5	PWR	VVER-1000/V-320	Operational	1003	9 Jul 1980	23 Dec 1988	
Kozloduy	6	PWR	VVER-1000/V-320	Operational	1003	1 Apr 1982	30 Dec 1993	
Kozloduy	7	PWR	AP1000	Planned	1150		(2033)	
Kozloduy	8	PWR	AP1000	Planned	1150			
Belene	1	PWR	VVER-1000/V-320; VVER-1000/V-446B	Unfinished	953; 1011	1987; 2008		
Belene	2	PWR	VVER-1000/V-320; VVER-1000/V-446B	Unfinished	953; 1011	1987; 2008		

== See also ==
- Energy in Bulgaria
- Politics of Bulgaria
