= Atomstroyexport =

Russian nuclear power equipment and service exporter

- Type: Joint Stock Company
- Industry: Nuclear technology
- Founded: 1973; 53 years ago
- Headquarters: Moscow, Russia
- Key people: Alexander Lokshin
- Products: Nuclear reactors
- Services: Construction of nuclear power and research projects
- Revenue: $1.82 billion (2017)
- Net income: −$18.3 million (2017)
- Total assets: $4.36 billion (2017)
- Total equity: $673 million (2017)
- Parent: Rosatom
- Website: http://ase-ec.ru

Atomstroyexport (ASE) JSC (Russian: Атомстройэкспорт) is the Russian Federation's nuclear power equipment and service exporter. It is a fully owned subsidiary of Rosatom.

== Organization ==
Atomstroyexport, along with Atomenergoprom, is part of Rosatom's Engineering Division, which is the corporation's main nuclear power plant (NPP) construction and export business. ASE's flagship product is the VVER reactor. Rosatom's NPP operating company is Rosenergoatom. In addition, ASE is closely associated with Atomenergomash, Rosatom's manufacturer of NPP equipment.

Alexander Lokshin, former CEO of Rosenergoatom, now the First Deputy CEO for Operations Management at Rosatom, is associated with ASE Group of Companies.

== History ==
The first research reactor was built and launched in China, at the "Institute of Nuclear Physics," in 1958. After two years in the city of Lanzhou to her it was erected a "Physical Institute". In it was an accelerator of the brand "U-150", specially built at the Izhorskiye Zavody for the Chinese (150 - is the diameter of the magnet poles in cm), the cyclotron, the deuteron has the energy of 18 MeV. The following year, the organization in the city of Řež (Czechoslovakia, now Czech Republic) is building "VVR-S", a research reactor (4 MW).

=== Recent period ===
The Russian nuclear vendor is building the first reactor power unit in Iranian Bushehr nuclear power plant located 400 kilometres (250 mi) southwest of Tehran under a US$1 billion contract signed in 1995. In 2007, Atomstroyexport signed a memorandum of understanding with Ciner Insaat Ticaret ve Sanayi to promote its VVER-design pressurized water reactors in Turkey. In Bangladesh, proposals have been prepared to resurrect the potential Rooppur nuclear power plant. In the UK, Atomstroyexport would consider partnering with a Western manufacturer for a new UK builder. In Morocco, Atomstroyexport is considering participation in construction of a nuclear power plant at Sidi Boulbra.

In late October 2006, the offer of Atomstroyexport for construction of the Belene Nuclear Power Plant in Bulgaria, using third-generation VVER-1000/V-446B reactors, was approved. The first unit would be in operation by 2013 and the second a year later. On 28 March 2012 the Bulgarian government announced the withdrawal from the Belene project due to a negative report regarding the viability of the future power plant and the lack of another major European or American investor.

Between 1999 and 2007, Atomstroyexport constructed the Tianwan Nuclear Power Plant in China, which consists of two VVER reactors with 1,060 MW each, and has signed an agreement for construction of units 3 and 4. Unit 5 to 8 are firmly planned.

On 19 February 2008, Atomstroyexport signed a cooperation agreement with Technopromexport, a Russian exporter of other large-scale power generation types, on the construction and management of power projects in Russia and abroad.

On 14 December 2009, Atomstroyexport bought Nukem Technologies for 23.5 million Euros, adding nuclear power plant decommissioning, waste management and engineering services to its portfolio.

Atomstroyexport has supplied the technology, the equipment, the components and the individual systems towards building six VVER-1000 reactors for the Kudankulam Nuclear Power Plant in India built in collaboration with Nuclear Power Corporation of India Limited (NPCIL), with an installed capacity of 6,000 MW of electricity.
