= Ziarul =

Short lived Romanian newspaper

Ziarul was a daily newspaper in Romania, published in Bucharest. It was founded in 2002 by Eugen Arnăutu, a PSD deputy. It was later taken over by Cristian Burca, former owner of the station Prima TV and Kiss FM. The newspaper changed owner again in October 2007, after Nicolae Bara decided, just months after taking over, to sell the shares it held in the newspaper. Viorel Sima, the new owner, was editor of the tabloid attack, and in June 2008 was also the owner of the weekly Umbra. The newspaper ceased publication in June 2008.
