= Bulgaria Dnes =

Bulgarian daily newspaper in Sofia

Bulgaria Dnes (Bulgaria Today), commonly Dnes, is a Bulgarian-language daily newspaper, based in Sofia.
