= Center for the Study of Democracy (Bulgaria) =

Bulgaria-based policy institute

- Formation: 1989; 37 years ago
- Type: Think tank
- Purpose: Policy development; Institutional reform
- Headquarters: Sofia, Bulgaria
- Region served: Europe
- Methods: Research; Advocacy; Consultancy
- Chairman: Ognian Shentov, Ph.D.
- Website: csd.eu www.csd.eu

The Center for the Study of Democracy, or CSD, is a European-based public policy institute dedicated to the values of democracy and market economy. The institute is an independent, non-partisan organization fostering the reform process through impact on policy and civil society.

== Objectives ==
CSD's objectives are to:

- Provide an enhanced institutional and policy capacity for a successful European integration process, especially in the area of justice and home affairs;
- Promote institutional reform and the practical implementation of democratic values in legal and economic practice;
- Monitor public attitudes and serve as a watchdog of the institutional reform process.

== History ==
Founded in late 1989 with the official goal of building bridges between scholars and policy-makers, the institute's work over the years has grown to include policy development and has made inroads into several areas traditionally perceived as the inviolable public property, such as anti-corruption institutional reform and national security. It has had its research cited by major publications such as The New York Times and The Wall Street Journal.
