= Kozloduy Nuclear Power Plant =

Nuclear power plant in Bulgaria

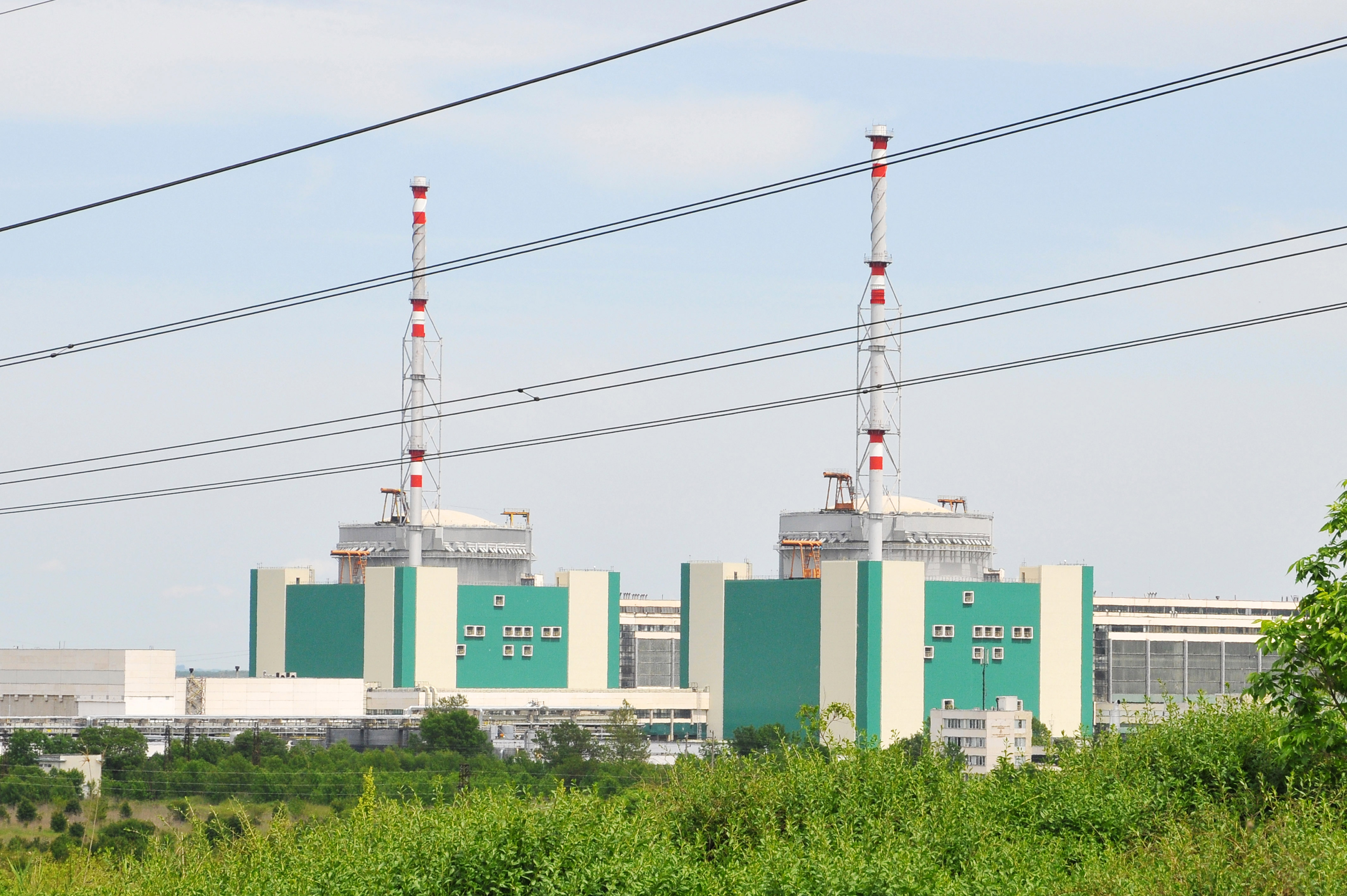
- Country: Bulgaria
- Location: Kozloduy
- Coordinates: 43°44′46″N 23°46′14″E
- Status: Operational
- Construction began: 1970
- Commission date: 28 October 1974; 1974 (Unit 1); 1975 (Unit 2); 1980 (Unit 3); 1982 (Unit 4); 1987 (Unit 5); 1991 (Unit 6)
- Decommission date: 2004 (Units 1 & 2); 2007 (Units 3 & 4)
- Owner: Bulgarian Energy Holding

Nuclear power station
- Reactor type: VVER-440; VVER-1000
- Thermal capacity: 2 x 3,120 MW_{th}

Power generation
- Units operational: 2 x 1088 MWe (gross)
- Units planned: 1 x 1,250 MWe
- Units decommissioned: 4 x 440 MWe (gross)
- Nameplate capacity: 2,176 MW
- Capacity factor: 87.2% (2014-2018)
- Annual net output: 16,023 GW·h

External links
- Website: www.kznpp.org
- Commons: Related media on Commons

The Kozloduy Nuclear Power Plant is a nuclear power plant in Bulgaria situated 180 kilometres (110 mi) north of Sofia and 5 kilometres (3.1 mi) east of Kozloduy, a town on the Danube river, near the border with Romania. It is the country's only nuclear power plant and the largest in the region. The construction of the first reactor began on 6 April 1970.

Kozloduy NPP currently manages two pressurized water reactors with a total gross output of 2,000 MWe and 1,966 MW net. Units 5 and 6, constructed in 1987 and 1991, respectively are VVER-1000 reactors. By 2017, Unit 5 was to be upgraded to reach a capacity of 1,100 MWe, as part of a programme to extend the life of the unit by 30 years. A seventh 1,000 MW was considered to be constructed, using parts from the terminated Belene project for which Bulgaria has paid 600 million euros. However, this option was abandoned. As of 2026, units 7 and 8 using AP1000 reactors are proposed.

The older and smaller Units 1 to 4 were all shut down by 2007. Two spent fuel storage facilities are part of the power plant.

== Reactor data ==
| Unit | Reactor type | Net capacity | Gross capacity | Thermal capacity | Construction start | First criticality | Grid date | Commercial operation | Shutdown |
|---|---|---|---|---|---|---|---|---|---|
| Kozloduy 1 | VVER-440 V-230 | 408 MWe | 440 MWe | 1375 MW | 1 April 1970 | 30 June 1974 | 24 July 1974 | 28 October 1974 | 31 December 2002 |
| Kozloduy 2 | VVER-440 V-230 | 408 MWe | 440 MWe | 1375 MW | 1 April 1970 | 22 August 1975 | 24 August 1975 | 10 November 1975 | 31 December 2002 |
| Kozloduy 3 | VVER-440 V-230 | 408 MWe | 440 MWe | 1375 MW | 1 October 1973 | 4 December 1980 | 17 December 1980 | 20 January 1981 | 31 December 2006 |
| Kozloduy 4 | VVER-440 V-230 | 408 MWe | 440 MWe | 1375 MW | 1 October 1973 | 25 April 1982 | 17 May 1982 | 20 June 1982 | 31 December 2006 |
| Kozloduy 5 | VVER-1000 V-320 | 1003 MWe | 1040 MWe | 3120 MW | 9 July 1980 | 5 November 1987 | 29 November 1987 | 23 December 1988 | (2047 est.) |
| Kozloduy 6 | VVER-1000 V-320 | 1003 MWe | 1040 MWe | 3120 MW | 1 April 1982 | 29 May 1991 | 2 August 1991 | 30 December 1993 | (2051 est.) |

== History ==
The nuclear power plant Kozloduy was the first nuclear power plant in Bulgaria and in Southeast Europe. The beginning of Bulgarian nuclear energy was established on July 15, 1966, with the signing of an agreement on cooperation between Bulgaria and the then-Soviet Union for the construction of a nuclear power plant. After a detailed technical and economic analysis, the construction site was chosen to be on the Danube River near Kozloduy.

The Soviet Union provided the main equipment, and individual equipment was supplied by the then-German Democratic Republic, Czechoslovakia and Hungary. Ground was first broken on October 14, 1969, and in April 1970, large-scale construction activities began, in which over a hundred thousand workers and engineers participated.

== Safety concerns and consequent shutdown of Units 1 to 4 ==
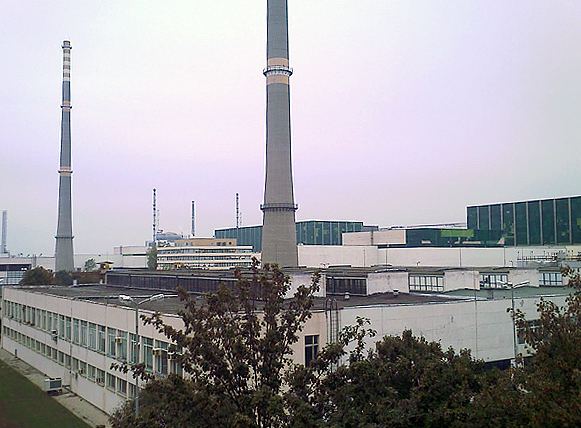
Units 1-4

Kozloduy NPP previously operated four older reactors of the VVER-440/230 design, but under a 1993 agreement between the European Commission and the Bulgarian government, Units 1 and 2 were taken off-line at the beginning of 2004. An unpublished 1995 report by the United States Department of Energy had supposedly listed those units among the world's "ten most dangerous reactors". On 21 October 2010, licenses for the shutdown reactors were transferred to Bulgaria state radioactive waste enterprise DP RAO, signaling the formal beginning of decommissioning work.

Throughout the 1990s and early 2000s Units 3 and 4, originally licensed for operation until 2011 and 2013, respectively, underwent substantial safety improvements and, after rigorous inspections, received positive reviews from the IAEA in 2002, and from the World Association of Nuclear Operators (WANO) in the following year, concluding that "no technical reasons exist for the early closure of units 3 & 4". Backed by these findings, the government had hoped to convince the European Commission to allow a postponement of the agreed pre-accession shutdown; from a legal and political standpoint, however, this proved untenable. Units 3 and 4 were taken out of operation in the final hours of 2006, immediately prior to the country's accession to the European Union.

82 metric tons of its spent fuel were sent to a repository in Zheleznogorsk, Krasnoyarsk Krai during 2001 and 2002. In 2008, officials at the power plant announced their intention to use CONSTOR storage casks for this purpose.

Prior to the shutdown of units 3 and 4, Kozloduy NPP produced 44% of Bulgaria's electricity supply; as of March 2006, Bulgaria exported about 14% of its electricity production.

=== Pressure to restart ===
In January 2009, during the 2008 Bulgarian energy crisis, Bulgaria's president Georgi Parvanov suggested that Unit 3 be restarted. However, this was never pursued as an option. In principle, under the conditions of its Accession Treaty Bulgaria could request temporary derogation from its commitments in the event of serious economic difficulties arising within the first three years of membership in the union.

== Units 5 and 6 ==
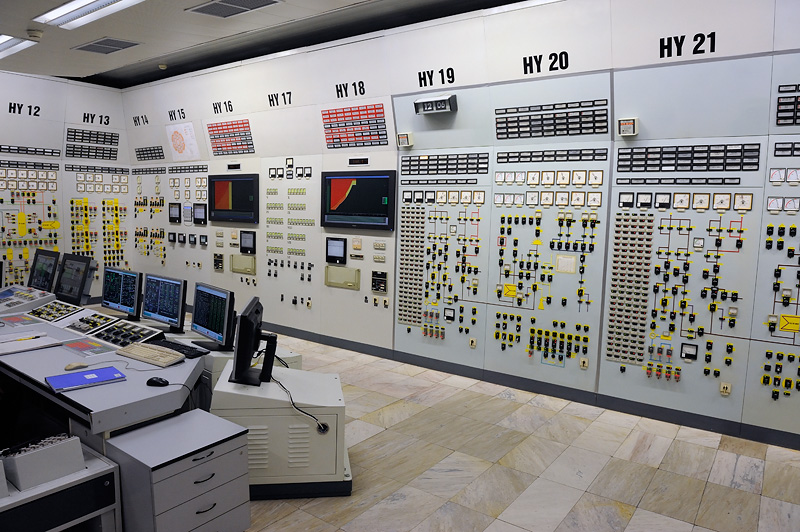
Inside the control room of Unit 5

Units 5 and 6 are VVER-1000 reactors, construction of which finished in 1987 and 1991 respectively. By 2017 Unit 5 was to be upgraded to reach a capacity of 1,100 MWe, as part of a programme to extend the life of the unit by 30 years.

In 2021 an alternative secondary fuel supply agreement was made with Westinghouse Electric Company, for supply diversification, and as of 2023 is seeking regulatory approval for the new fuel.

On 30 December 2022, an agreement was made with Framatome to supply fuel and fuel assemblies for Unit 6 of the Bulgarian Nuclear Power Plant.

== Ownership ==
Kozloduy Nuclear Power Plant is a subsidiary of Bulgarian Energy Holding EAD.

=== Future expansion ===
In 2012 Bulgaria's government decided to start the construction of a new reactor in Kozloduy after it gave up on the construction of what was supposed to be the country's second nuclear power plant in Belene. Thus, the Bulgarian government decided to install in Kozloduy the 1000 MW reactor that the Russian state company Atomstroyexport already produced for the Belene NPP. The Belene Nuclear Power Plant project was terminated in late March 2012.

In October 2013, the Ministry of Environment and Water approved the environmental impact assessment report on the investment proposal for Unit 7, thereby giving a green light for its construction. A month later it was announced that construction of the reactor could begin in 2019 if full approval is granted by the Council of Ministers in 2014. The Bulgarian Energy Holding (short BEH) propose to construct a Westinghouse AP1000. Negotiations between the BEH and Westinghouse already started.

In 2013 the Austrian Environment Agency prepared a report on the Bulgarian Ministry for the Environment's Environmental Impact Assessment (EIA) on the proposed 7th unit of the Kozloduy Nuclear Power Plant. It assesses whether the EIA-Report allows for making reliable conclusions about the potential trans-boundary impacts on Austria. The Austrian report considers the assumption, that the Kozloduy NPP site is flood-proof, to be well-founded and the seismic hazard at the site to be low (but points out that the seismic hazard study needs updating as it was performed 20 years ago). It also highlights a number of unsubstantiated claims and some failings in the Bulgarian EIA report. These include:

- shortcomings in the safety analyses of the reactors being considered, including a lack of the consideration of post-Fukushima lessons learned and, as far as applicable, the use of the concept of practical elimination (pgs 60-61);
- serious gaps in the assessment of the impact of external human induced events such as crashes, leaks etc. (pgs 72-73);
- contrary to IAEA (2002) analysis requirements, the EIA report does not contain considerations about the formation of pressure shock waves and their possible impact on buildings of the NNU due to explosions outside the perimeter of the NPP (pg 73)
- no comprehensible technical basis provided for an evaluation of design basis accidents and severe accidents (pg 84)
- only three (insufficient) “typical” dry case weather conditions were used for the calculations of the trans-boundary impacts on the Austrian territory, not worst case scenarios.
