= Belene Nuclear Power Plant =

Abandoned nuclear power plant in northern Bulgaria

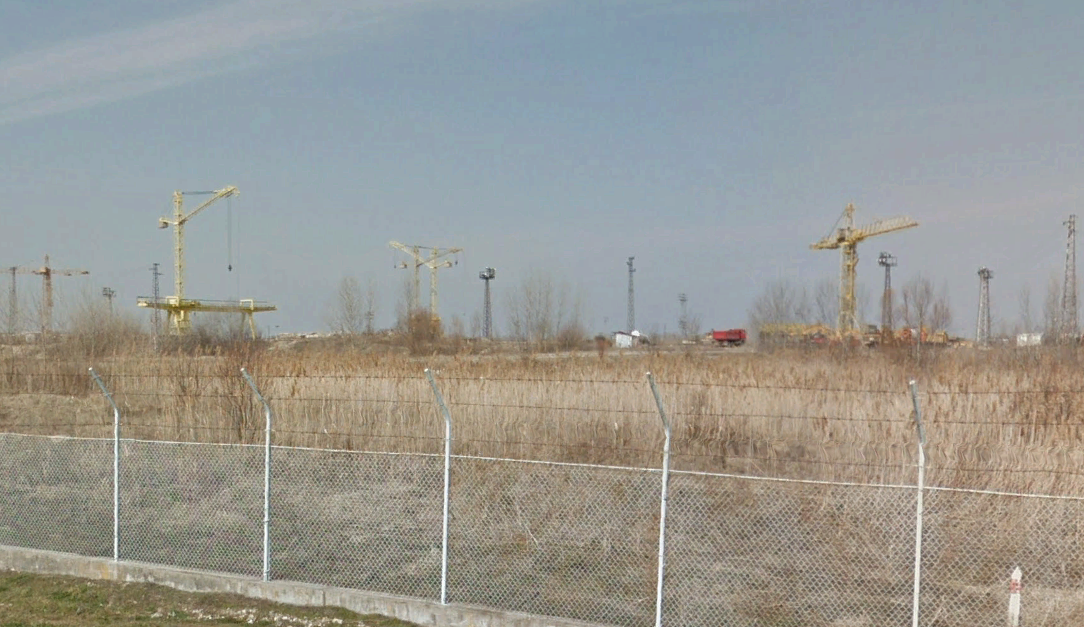
- Country: Bulgaria
- Coordinates: 43°37′46″N 25°11′12″E
- Status: Construction abandoned
- Construction began: 1 January 1987
- Owner: Bulgarian National Electricity Company

Power generation
- Units planned: 2 x 1,000 MW
- Nameplate capacity: 2,000 MW

External links
- Commons: Related media on Commons

The Belene Nuclear Power Plant (Bulgarian: Атомна електроцентрала „Белене“, romanized: Atomna elektrotsentrala "Belene") is an abandoned nuclear power plant 3 km from Belene and 11 km from Svishtov in Pleven Province, northern Bulgaria, on the right bank of the Danube River. It was intended to substitute four VVER-440 V230 reactors of the Kozloduy Nuclear Power Plant that were decommissioned as a prerequisite for Bulgaria to join the European Union.

On June 11, 2010, the Bulgarian government announced an indefinite freeze on the planned construction of the Belene nuclear power plant because it was uncertain on the duration of the return on investment. Five months later, on December 2, a non-binding memorandum of understanding was signed between NEK EAD, Rosatom, Altran and Fortum, setting up a 6.3 billion euro price on the power station, after months of unsuccessful talks on the cost and redeemability of the project itself. Further disagreement and the persistent demands of the Bulgarian government to lower the cost under 5 billion euro led to the termination of the project in March 2012. However, in late 2012 the opposition initiated a referendum petition and the first national referendum in the history of modern Bulgaria was held on January 27, 2013. More than 60% of voters voted Yes to the construction of a new nuclear power plant, but turnout of 1,385,283 votes, or 20% of registered voters, was insufficient for the results to be binding. The referendum passed the question further to the Parliament, which decided on 27 February 2013 to suspend it. In June 2018 the Bulgarian Parliament voted to abolish the moratorium on the construction of the power plant and in December 2019 Minister of Energy announced that five companies placed bids and have been selected as prospective strategic investors in the project.

In 2023 the government abandoned construction plans and instead intends to build a new reactor at the Kozloduy plant. In February 2025, Ukraine's Verkhovna Rada approved a plan to purchase unused VVER-1000 equipment from cancelled Belene Nuclear Power Plant to complete Khmelnytskyi NPP units 3 and 4.

== History ==
=== Early project ===
The discussions on constructing a second nuclear power plant started in the early 1970s. The Belene site was approved for the construction of a second Bulgarian NPP by a Council of Ministers decree on 20 March 1981. The site was handed to the Ministry of Economics on 31 December 1981 and the documentation for the construction site's preparation was prepared in late 1980 and early 1981 by Energoproekt Sofia. The site's preparation in accordance with the draft projects began in the early 1981.

The foundations of the future power plant were laid in 1987 after the design of Atomenergoproekt Kyiv from the USSR and Energoproekt Sofia. The design suggested the construction of four VVER-1000/320 units. Between 1988 and 1990 40% of the construction work on Unit 1 was finished and 80% of the equipment was supplied. The project was abandoned in 1990 due to the fall of communism in Bulgaria and only conservation work was done thereafter. Since then, measures have been continuously undertaken to preserve the supplied equipment, the construction site and the buildings; various investigations and assessments have been carried out with respect to the site suitability and the equipment status, all of which yielded positive conclusions. New investigations have been performed in relation to site safety and its compliance with international requirements. There has been particularly extensive research on the seismic safety of the chosen site. A number of missions were carried out by the International Atomic Energy Agency (IAEA) and other bodies of authority. All these came up with positive conclusions and confirmations that the Belene site is suitable for the construction of a nuclear power plant.

The majority of the heavy equipment supplied for Belene's Unit 1 in the late 1980s, including the reactor vessel, was bought back by Atomstroyexport in 2007 and installed at Unit 4 of the Kalinin Nuclear Power Plant, which was connected to the grid on 24 November 2011.

=== Restart ===
In 2002 the Government decided in-principle for a restart of the Belene Project. Fulfillment of all legislative requirements allowed the Government to approve the construction of a nuclear power plant on the Belene site with total rated capacity of 2000 megawatts. The Ministry of Energy began to renew the available equipment and examine the possible construction of the new nuclear plant. In February 2003 Minister Milko Kovachev sent letters to six leading companies in the sphere of nuclear energy asking them to provide up-to-date technical, economic and financial information regarding the project.

A working group of experts was formed by an order of the Ministry of Energy and Energy Resources of 27 May 2003, which included experts from the Ministry of Energy and Energy Resources, the Ministry of Environment and Waters, the Ministry of Transport and Communication, the Ministry of Internal Affairs, the Ministry of Health, the Nuclear Regulatory Agency, the State Energy and Water Regulatory Commission, the State Agency for Civil Protection, the National Electric Company and BulAtom. A programme for the expert commission's work was approved on 4 July 2003.

Pursuant to the above-mentioned decision, on May 10, 2005, the National Electric Company launched a procedure for selection of a Contractor for the engineering, procurement, and commissioning of Belene Nuclear Power Plant, Units 1&2.

In late October 2006 the offer of the Russian Atomstroyexport, the French Framatome (Areva), and the German Siemens using third-generation VVER-1000/V-446B reactors was approved by the National Electric Company. The offer was selected due to the highest safety level guaranteed by several new independent active and passive safety systems, as well as the option for Atomstroyexport to buy back the old unit supplied in the 1980s. Another reasons was the 60-year operation term. According to the Atomstroyexport president, the first unit would be in operation by 2013 and the second a year later.

On 7 December 2007 the European Commission gave its favourable opinion to the NPP, saying that it met all requirements of articles 41 to 44 of the Euratom Treaty. A favourable opinion of the EC is one of the requirements for a Euratom loan.

On 18 January 2008, Atomstroyexport and Bulgaria's National Electric Company (NEC) signed the contract for the design, construction and installation of units 1 and 2 of the Belene NPP. On 3 September 2008, the construction of the Belene NPP officially started. According to the Minister of Energy Petar Dimitrov, the Belene plant would operate "the most secure reactors existing in the world"; he also asserted that "the chance there would be a failure in those reactors is practically zero". Prime Minister Stanishev and Minister Dimitrov also called the project "a Renaissance for Bulgaria's nuclear energy" and "the largest industrial project in Bulgaria in the last eighteen years". More than 10,000 construction workers would be employed in the project, with the first reactor expected to be operating by the end of 2013, the second by the end of 2014.

According to the schedule, Unit 1 of the A92 design has to be erected for 6.5 years and Unit 2 for 7.5 years with consideration of the specific licensing terms as per the Bulgarian legislation. The longest time-consuming activities are related to the design work and equipment delivery (58 months), as well as to the very construction and installation (51 months).

=== Termination of the project ===
The negotiations stalled again after the GERB government decided to add an American or a European contractor to the project, as well as insisting for Atomstroyexport to lower the price to less than five billion euro. As no major European or American investor appeared, the talks continued to yield no results. This led to the official termination of the Belene project in March 2012. A thermal power plant using natural gas from the then-planned South Stream pipeline was proposed to be built on the site, while the reactor supplied for Unit 1 was foreseen to be built as Unit 7 at the Kozloduy NPP.

In June 2016, the International Court of Arbitration awarded Atomstroyexport €620 million in compensation for equipment already manufactured for the plant, which will be delivered to Bulgaria following payment.

=== Possible project restart ===
After the election in May 2013 the new Bulgarian government of Plamen Oresharski (Socialist Party) started to speak publicly about restarting the project.

In 2016 discussions took place with Rosatom, the manufacturer of the reactors, about the possibility of installing one at Kozloduy Nuclear Power Plant and selling the second one to a third party. An alternative is a privately financed completion of Belene.

On 7 June 2018, the Bulgarian Parliament voted to abolish the moratorium on the construction of the power plant. The aim of the government is to complete the project through funding by a strategic investor, what interest has so far been declared by several companies. Minister of Energy should develop an investor selection procedure and propose options for structuring the project by 31 October 2018. According to the Minister, the plant can be completed within 7–8 years.

In December 2019, the Bulgarian energy ministry said it had selected five companies among the 13 applications received to participate in the project. China National Nuclear Corporation (CNNC), Korea Hydro & Nuclear Power (KHNP) and Rosatom as potential strategic investors. Framatome and General Electric (GE) have also been selected; Framatome expressed interest in providing safety systems, GE offered design and supply equipment, turbines, compressors and transformers.

== Technical features ==
The AES 92 variant proposed for implementation at the Belene NPP site is a new generation VVER type reactor that has been licensed by regulatory authorities in Russia. It has been declared to meet all safety requirements as well as recommendations from the IAEA and INSAG and has been also confirmed by a special analysis of leading experts from EDF based on the recognized European Utility Requirements. This variant of the AES can make use of the two partially completed Belene NPP reactors started in the 1980s. The design directly uses a majority of the already built civil structures and facilities related to generic plant needs. Existing foundations and civil structures will be further evaluated with a view to incorporation into the new design.

=== AES 92 reactor ===
Belene NPP will be a pressurized water reactor design with four first-stage coolant circulation loops per reactor. Reactor nominal thermal power is 3010 MWt and electrical net power is 1011 MWe. A typical refueling process takes 14 days with annual outage of between 20-28 and 40–50 days, depending on the scope of ongoing repair works. The AES 92 Reactor Facility has a 60-year lifetime design.

Being a Light Water Reactor of third generation type the AES 92 design has improved safety as well as technical and economic features. Main advantages of the AES 92 design over existing VVER nuclear power plants of the previous generation are:

- Ensuring for fast and sure termination of the nuclear reaction in the reactor core thanks to two individual completely independent reactivity control systems;
- Redundancy for all safety functions provided by the use of both active and passive safety systems (including a Passive Residual Heat Removal System and Passive Filtering System), which require neither operator intervention nor electric power supply;
- Use of a special enclosure to contain potential accidents. This structure is composed of a primary containment of pre-stressed reinforced concrete and a leak tight metal liner, secondary reinforced concrete containment, and cast concrete external structure designed to withstand a large range of internal and external events.

A specific feature of the third generation reactor presented in the AES 92 variant is the provision of a "core catcher" for severe accident cases. This insures against a containment integrity violation and release of highly radioactive substances into the environment.

Improved safety in the AES 92 design accounts for projected improvements in radiation protection parameters during its operation. The calculated individual effective dose of personnel exposure for this design is 1 mSv/a, which is commensurate with the permissible annual effective dose limit for a person in the general population and in compliance with the Bulgarian normative base and European directives. As to the design dose rate per person of the greater population due to radioactive releases by the NPP: this value for the AES 92 variant is lower than 0.05 mSv/a, which represents less than 1/3 of the permissible dose rate as per article 10 of NRA's regulations ensuring the safety of NPPs. This dose is pertinent to the effect of all sources of releases at the site. The normalized annual radioactive releases are also indicative for the improved environmental impact parameters (for 1000 MW). While target criteria stipulated for the unit design was < 6.7 GBq/a for liquid releases, the design value for AES 92 is lower by one order - 0.11 GBq/a. Similarly, with target criteria below 33.3 TBq/a for the liquid releases, the design value for AES 92 is 2.9 TBq/a.

Spent Nuclear Fuel (SNF) management and the Radioactive Waste (RAW) handling is an important aspect of the environmental impact assessment for the new plant. The fuel envisaged to be used for AES 92 allows for up to 50 years storage of spent fuel assemblies in a storage pool and then an additional 10 years of “dry” storage keeping. The general plan provides for SNF transportation to Russia for reprocessing.

Plasma incineration of solid wastes is envisaged for high-level waste generated during plant operation, with separate processing of liquid wastes depending on radioactivity. The anticipated total amount of conditioned wastes that will require disposal is less than 50 m^{3} per year for one reactor unit.

== Controversy ==
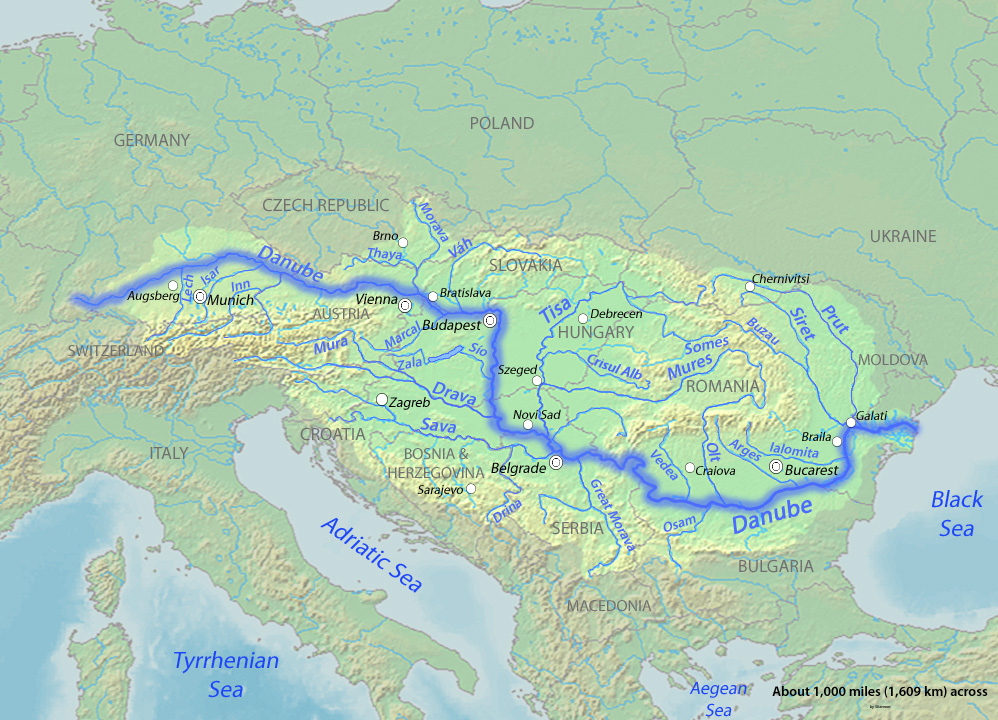
Danube

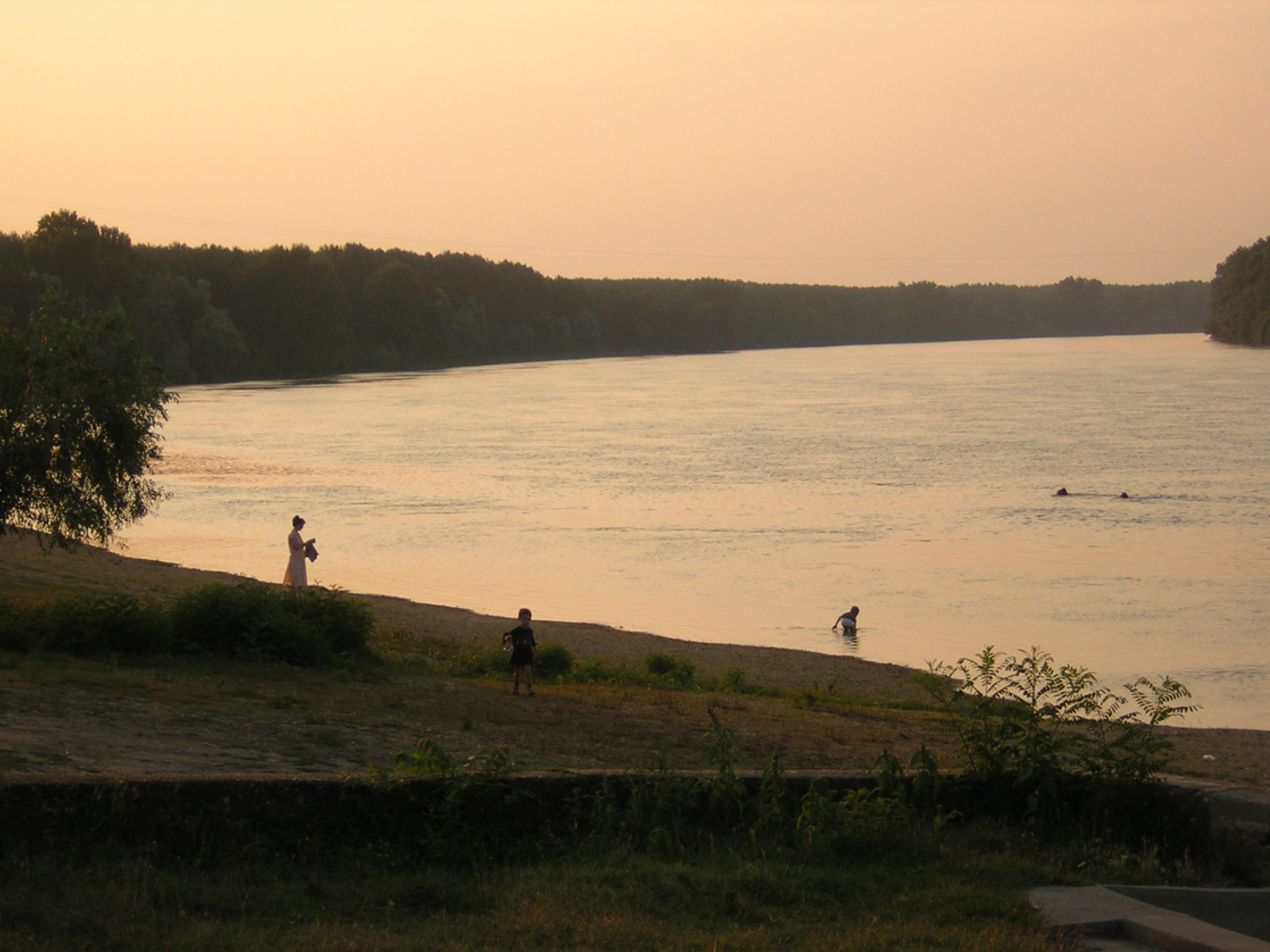
Danube at Belene

Belene island

There is controversy over the environmental impact assessment (EIA), which "does not contain adequate information on the seismic conditions, nor does it address beyond design basis accidents or give details of the potential impacts of decommissioning". Furthermore, following legal action by environmental groups, the authors of the original EIA confirmed, in court, that it was flawed and would require a new EIA once a designer and builder were appointed. The total cost of the project is now estimated by the operator to be around €7 billion (€4 billion for the power stations plus associated infrastructure development costs).

Environmental organizations Greenpeace, Friends of the Earth (Europe), Urgewald, Bankwatch, World Information Service on Energy and the Bulgarian NGO BeleNE! oppose the plant's construction, and have expressed the following concerns:

- negative effect on the tourist industry and the agriculture of northern Bulgaria
- safety concerns over the use of nuclear technology
- location in a seismic active zone
- the expense of the project
- risk of terrorist attack
- problems with the transportation, procession and preservation of the nuclear waste
- complete unnecessity of further nuclear power in the first place, as better options are available.

Concerns regarding the construction of the plant have mainly been felt in nearby Romania, with articles in the newspapers such as Cotidianul, România Liberă and Ziarul even going as far as comparing the project with Chernobyl despite plans to use a new generation of VVER reactors, and not the cheaper graphite-moderated RBMK series like Chernobyl.

Critics say the project is economically flawed, open to corruption and mismanagement, and will cement Russian dominance of Bulgaria's energy sector.

== See also ==
- Nuclear power in Bulgaria
