= Nukem Technologies =

German nuclear engineering company

NUKEM Technologies GmbH(branded as NUKEM)
- Type: Subsidiary
- Industry: Nuclear engineering
- Founded: 1 April 1960; 66 years ago as NUKEM GmbH (Nuklearchemie und –metallurgie GmbH)
- Founder: Degussa; Rio Tinto; Mallinckrodt
- Headquarters: Karlstein am Main, Germany
- Services: Radioactive waste and spent fuel management Nuclear engineering and consulting Nuclear decommissioning TRISO fuel technology
- Number of employees: 170
- Parent: Muroosystems Corporation
- Website: www.nukemtechnologies.de

NUKEM Technologies GmbH (branded as NUKEM) is a German nuclear engineering company based in Karlstein am Main. Its history dates to 1960. Its activities include nuclear decommissioning, radioactive waste management, spent fuel handling, and the development of TRISO fuel technology.

The company's headquarters are at the site of the former Kahl Nuclear Power Plant, which was decommissioned and restored by NUKEM.

NUKEM changed ownership several times. While under Russian ownership, the company faced regulatory and commercial restrictions after the Russia-Ukraine war began in 2022. In April 2024, it filed for self-administered insolvency in Germany. Muroosystems Corporation acquired core assets of the business in October 2024, after which operations continued under the restructured company.

== History ==
=== Founding and Fuel Cycle Operations (1960–1988) ===
NUKEM Technologies traces its origins to 1960, when NUKEM GmbH (Nuklearchemie und -metallurgie GmbH) was established through a joint investment by Degussa, Rio Tinto, and Mallinckrodt. The company initially focused on nuclear fuel element production and trade.

In 1969, the company sold its light water reactor fuel business to KWU (a joint venture between Siemens and AEG), after which its activities shifted toward uranium trading, nuclear waste management, and engineering services.

By the mid-1980s, NUKEM was engaged in both front-end and back-end nuclear fuel cycle services and participated in the Wackersdorf reprocessing plant project in Germany. The project was later cancelled in 1989 following political decisions and public opposition.

=== RWE Ownership and International Expansion (1988–2005) ===
In 1988, NUKEM became a wholly owned subsidiary of RWE AG.

During the 1990s and early 2000s, the company expanded its activities internationally, including projects at nuclear sites in Slovakia (Bohunice), Russia (Balakovo), and Ukraine (Khmelnytskyi).

In 2003, construction of a waste treatment facility at the Chernobyl Nuclear Power Plant was initiated.

=== Private Equity Ownership and Business Restructuring (2006–2012) ===
In 2006, RWE sold NUKEM to Advent International for €205 million.

Following the acquisition, the company was restructured, with nuclear fuel trading retained under the parent entity and engineering and waste management operations transferred to NUKEM Technologies GmbH.

In 2007, several subsidiaries were divested, including NUKEM Ltd. (UK), NUKEM Corp. (USA), NIS Ingenieure (Germany), and Assistance Nucléaire S.A. (France).

In 2011, the isotope trading business was separated into NUKEM Isotopes GmbH.

In 2012, the nuclear fuel trading division NUKEM Energy GmbH was sold to Cameco.

=== Russian Ownership (2009–2024) ===
On 14 December 2009, NUKEM Technologies GmbH was acquired by Atomstroyexport, a subsidiary of Rosatom.

In 2014, NUKEM Technologies Engineering Services GmbH was established as a subsidiary focusing on decommissioning and radioactive waste management.

Following developments after 2022, the company faced operational constraints in European markets.

In April 2024, insolvency proceedings were initiated in Germany.

=== Acquisition by Muroosystems and Restructuring (2024–present) ===
On 29 May 2024, Muroosystems Corporation agreed to acquire shares in NUKEM Technologies Engineering Services GmbH and selected assets.

Regulatory approval was granted in September 2024, and the transaction was completed in October 2024.

In December 2024, NUKEM Technologies GmbH was liquidated, and remaining operations were transferred to NUKEM Technologies Engineering Services GmbH.

== Projects ==
NUKEM Technologies has undertaken work in nuclear decommissioning, radioactive waste management, spent fuel storage, and fuel-cycle technologies in several countries.

At the Ignalina Nuclear Power Plant in Lithuania, the company's work included the design and construction of interim spent fuel storage and solid waste treatment facilities. A dry spent fuel storage facility was constructed for the Kozloduy Nuclear Power Plant in Bulgaria. The company provided radioactive waste treatment and conditioning facilities at the Leningrad and Kursk nuclear power plants in Russia, and developed and delivered a solid radioactive waste management complex at the Chernobyl Nuclear Power Plant in Ukraine. It also supplied process equipment and related services for a spent ion exchange resin treatment facility at the Zhangzhou Nuclear Power Plant in China.

In South Africa, NUKEM was awarded a contract in 2007 to design and supply a pilot fuel plant for the Pebble Bed Modular Reactor (PBMR) programme; the project was later cancelled. In Indonesia, the company carried out early-stage design and feasibility work for a 10 MW high-temperature gas-cooled reactor (HTGR) experimental facility in cooperation with local partners. The work was commissioned by the country's National Nuclear Energy Agency (Batan).

NUKEM participated in dismantling work at the Brennilis Nuclear Power Plant in France. At the Mühleberg Nuclear Power Plant in Switzerland, it conducted pre-dismantling feasibility studies that included an evaluation of methods for characterising radioactive concrete debris. Dismantling work at the Oskarshamn Nuclear Power Plant in Sweden was completed in cooperation with Uniper Nuclear Services GmbH and included removal of the final reactor pressure vessel.

== Transnuklear ==
Transnuklear (TN) GmbH was founded in 1966 as a subsidiary of Nukem and had been responsible for the transportation of nuclear fuel in West Germany until its operating licenses were suspended.

In the 1980s, illegalities occurred in the transport of radioactive waste to and from West Germany and the reprocessing centre (SCK CEN) in Mol, Belgium. SCK CEN employees were bribed by Transnuklear employees to receive higher-level nuclear waste than permitted.

The irregularities came to light after 21 October 1986, when an accident occurred in Kwaadmechelen with a Transnuklear transport from Krümmel Nuclear Power Plant to SCK CEN in Mol. Nuclear waste being transported did not correspond to the documents.

On 8 April 1987, Nukem informed the public prosecutor of Hesse of irregularities by Transnuklear during the 1981-1986 period. Nukem was aware of the illegal activities a month earlier, but waited until after the 5 April 1987 Hessian state election, which gave a narrow majority for Federal Minister for Nuclear Safety Walter Wallmann (CDU).

The bribes concerned millions of Belgian francs for hundreds of transports in nuclear waste. On 10 December 1987, three Transnuklear employees were arrested. The manager of Transnuklear, Hans Holtz, committed suicide in jail a few days later.

On 17 December 1987, German Environment Minister Klaus Töpfer instructs the nuclear authorities of Hesse to rescind the permits of Transnuklear. On 13 January 1988, Töpfer announced an investigation into transportation of nuclear fuel by Nukem/Transnuklear to Pakistan and Libya. This would be a violation of the Non-Proliferation Treaty.

On 21 January 1988, the European Parliament established a committee of inquiry into the nuclear waste scandal. The German Bundestag and the Belgian Chamber of Representatives also established a parliamentary inquiry committee.

Together with the 1986 Chernobyl disaster, this scandal led to the creation of the Bundesamt für Strahlenschutz in Germany and the Federal Agency for Nuclear Control (FANC) in Belgium.
