= K-500-65/3000 steam turbine =

Steam turbine engine

K-500-65/3000

Overview
- Manufacturer: Kharkiv Turbine Plant (Turboatom)
- Designer: Yuriy Fedorovych Koskyak
- Also called: К-500-65/3000
- Production: 1971–1989

Layout
- Configuration: Single-shaft, five-cylinder steam turbine

Combustion
- Operating principle: Steam expansion through high- and low-pressure cylinders
- Fuel system: Steam distribution via collector feeds
- Management: Steam flow regulation system
- Fuel type: Steam (generated from RBMK-1000 reactor)
- Oil system: Hydraulic lubrication system
- Cooling system: Condenser cooling system

Output
- Power output: 500 MW

Emissions
- Emissions target standard: None

Chronology
- Predecessor: K-220-44
- Successor: K-500-65/3000-2

K-500-65/3000 steam turbine is a steam turbine developed by the Kharkiv Turbine Plant (now Turboatom) in 1970 for usage in nuclear power plants with RBMK-1000. The turbine widely operated in Chernobyl, Leningrad, Kursk, and Smolensk.

== History ==
In 1970, turbine engineer Yuriy Fedorovych Koskyak and his team designed the K-500-65/3000 steam turbine with 3000 rpm for the Leningrad NPP. Designing such with high power and high rotational speed was an engineering challenge, however, it was successfully manufactured. In 1971, the first turbine units were installed at the Leningrad NPP. For this achievement, Yuriy Kosyak was awarded the State Prize of Ukrainian SSR in 1979. The designation behind the steam turbine was K for Kharkiv, 500 for the turbine’s nominal power output, 65 for the steam pressure in atmosphere, and 3000 for the turbine’s rotational speed in RPM.

Beginning in 1977, a high-accuracy geometric levelling was used over seven years to measure deformations of four K-500-65/3000 steam turbines in Leningrad NPP. The measurements determined settling and residual deformations of the lower foundation played thermal deformations of the upper structure, and shifts in the turbine shaft from bearings during start-up and shut-down procedures of the turbine. Results showed that within the first days after turbine operation changes, relatives bearing shifts had occurred, which was later acknowledged during mounting, operation and maintenance.

Between 2006 and 2011, modernization of the low-pressure cylinder flow sections was carried out on 21 turbines at multiple plants. To improve thermal efficiency and reliability of power units with K-500-65/3000 turbines, balance and operation inspections tests were carried out between 2008 and 2010. These inspections took place in the Kursk Nuclear Power Plant and Leningrad Nuclear Power Plant. In February 2012, tests were conducted on the modernized moister separator-reheaters of the turbines at power unit No. 4 in Leningrad NPP. These separator-reheaters had MSRs-500-1 with Powervane louvers developed by the Balcke-Dürr company. In 2013, balance tests of district heating installations were also performed at Leningrad NPP, which determined the performance of the equipment.

== Design ==
The K-500-65/3000 turbine itself is single-shaft with a five-cylinder unit that includes one high-pressure unit, one high-pressure cylinder (HPC), and four low-pressure cylinders (LPC). Steam from the separator drum passes through steam filters to the two paired steam distribution valve blocks, after which it is directed into the HPC through two oppositely positioned pipes. The HPC is a two-flow design with five pressure stages in each flow. After passing through the HPC, the steam is sent for separation and reheating in four combined separator-superheaters (SSPs), and afterwards it enters the LPCs. The LPCs is also a two-flow design with five pressure stages between each flow. Finally, after the LPCs, the steam is directed into separate condensers for each cylinder. The HPC and LPC rotors are connected to each other and to the generator rotor by rigid couplings, supported by journal bearings. The turbine is also equipped with a hydraulic rotor lift system for startup mode and a turning gets located between the third and fourth LPCs.

The configuration is a block-based turbine plant with two K-500-65/3000 turbines and a steam generator. As part of the “double-block” configuration, a single RBMK-1000 reactor supplied steam to two such turbines, which operated indefinitely, allowing each turbine to operate separately even if the other was shut down.

=== Steam Parameters & Distribution ===
This turbine operates at a rated fresh steam flow of 510 tons per hour, with maximum fresh steam flow rate of 550 tons per hour. The pressure is 10.325 kPa, and has an initial steam temperature 280.4°C. Steam is distributed through common collector feeds via four pipelines to twin blocks of steam distribution valves. It has two combined IBS units in each block. For the management of condensation, steam is discharged at 354.6 kPa to SPP for moisture separation and overheating to 265.4°C.

== Other Versions ==
- K-500-65/3000-2

The K-500-65/3000-2 Turbine was later developed by the Kharkiv turbine plant. It did not have a condensing steam turbine without controlled steam extraction, featuring single-stage two-step steam reheating. It was installed in single-loop nuclear power plants with RBMK-1000 reactors, and was designed to convert the thermal energy of water steam into mechanical energy to rotate the TVV-500-2U3 turbo generator rotors. The turbine operates at a rotational speed of 3000 rpm, and consists of a single-shaft, five-cylinder active-type unit, comprising one high-pressure cylinder (HPC), and four low-pressure cylinders (LPC) symmetrically positioned on either side of the HPC. The LPCs have eight exhausts leading to four condensers. The HPV casing is a two-flow, double-walled construction, with five pressure stages in each flow. The flow section of the HPC is equipped with an advanced cooling system. Despite efforts to improve design and reduce the amount of materials required, the operation of the K-500-65/3000-2 turbines revealed increased density to working parameters, which led to frequent vibration issues in the bearings.

== Incidents ==
- On October 11, 1991, a K-500-65/3000 turbine connected to Chernobyl Reactor 2 was idled for maintenance, when it suddenly caught fire from an electrical surge. This caused the roof to catch fire and one of the support trusses to collapse. After this incident, the reactor was shut down also due to political pressure.
