= KNPP =

KNPP may refer to:

- Karenni National Progressive Party, Myanmar
- Kudankulam Nuclear Power Plant, India
- Kursk Nuclear Power Plant, Russia
