= List of political scandals in Belgium =

This is a list of political scandals in Belgium from 1830 to present.

== List of scandals ==
- Victor Jacobs affair (1881)
- Julien Lahaut assassination (1950)
- Guy Jespers affair (end 1970s)
- KS affair (end 1980s)
- Marc Dutroux affair (1980s-1990s)
- Albert Canal pipeline affair (1990s)
- Superclub affair (1990s)
- Cools assassination (1991)
- Agusta scandal (scandal broke early 1990s)
- Aralco affair (early 1990s)
- OMOB affair (early 1990s)
- UNIOP-INUSOP affair (early 1990s)
- Murder of Karel Van Noppen (1990s)
- Dioxine crisis (1999)
- Carolorégienne affair (2005)
- ICDI affair (2006)
- Fall of the Leterme Government (2008)

== See also ==
- Parliamentary inquiries by the Belgian Federal Parliament
- Salamander (TV series) - a TV series covering a fictional scandal in Belgium
