= Carolorégienne affair =

Political and financial scandal in Belgium

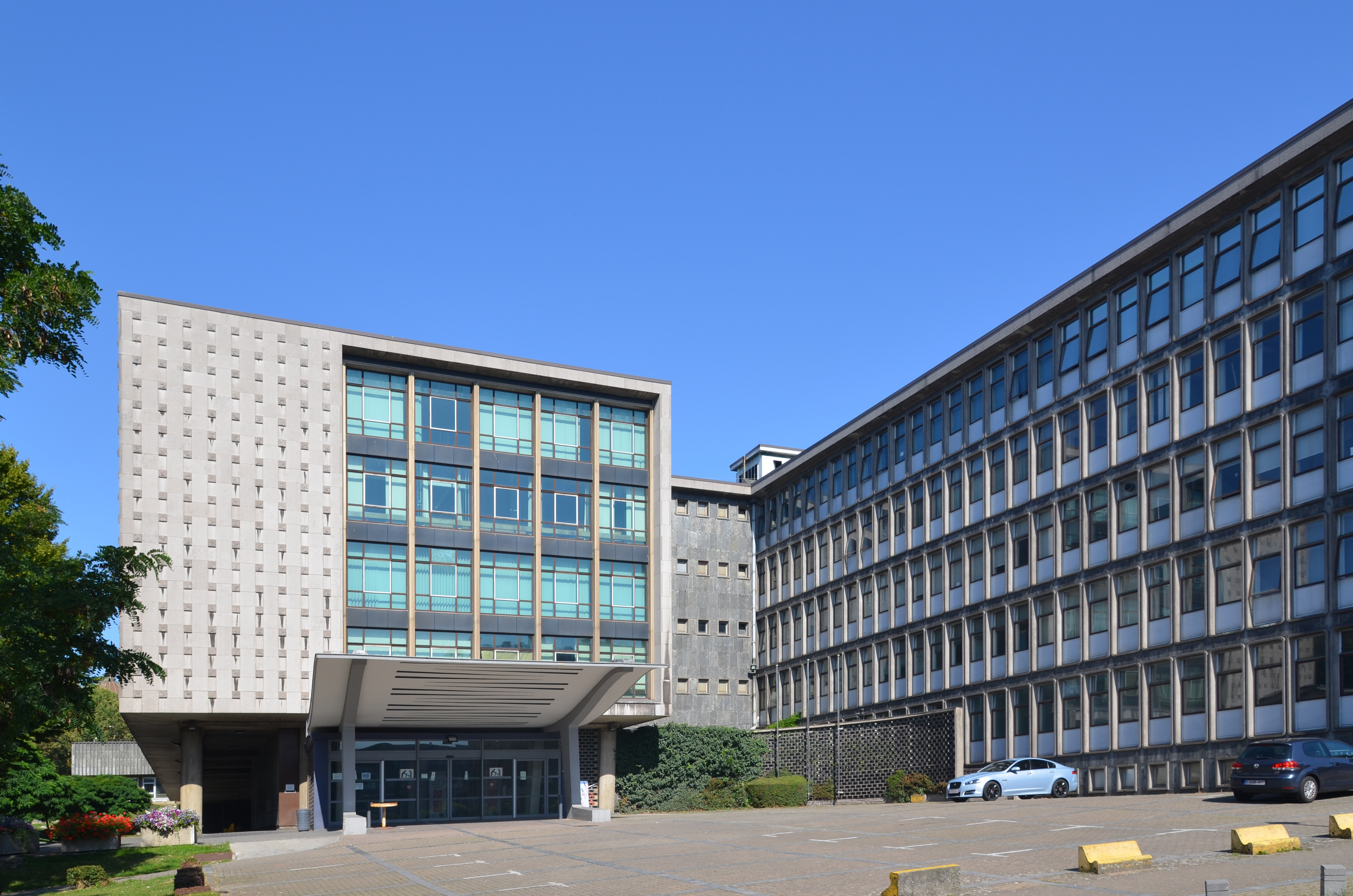
The Courthouse in Charleroi.

The Carolorégienne affair was a political scandal which took place in Belgium between 2005 and 2007. Court cases implicated personalities of the municipal government in the city of Charleroi.

In October 2006, mayor Jacques Van Gompel of the Socialist Party (PS) was jailed on fraud and forgery charges. Léon Casaert, also of the PS, became the new mayor, elected by PS, Reformist Movement (MR) and Humanist Democratic Centre (cdH) majorities. The MR resigned from the coalition just before the 2007 Belgian federal election, citing official charges of corruption leveled against a PS alderman in Charleroi.

The affair had implications at the local, regional and even national levels. Elio Di Rupo, president of the Socialist Party, attributed the defeat of his party in the 2007 Belgian federal election to the scandal. After the 2007 general election, the PS placed the Charleroi local party section under the supervision of Paul Magnette, with the city executive resigning. Mayor Casaert was charged with fraud on 18 June 2007, but only stepped down after a new city executive had been formed.

On 16 August 2007, 33 people were charged in different cases by the investigating judge. In April 2010, the director of technical services of Charleroi, Henri Stassens, was convicted in court of fraud and corruption. On 29 June 2012, additional convictions were pronounced. The affair ended in March 2016 after these cases were completed.

== The Carolorégienne scandal: Mismanagement of Charleroi public housing ==
Charleroi manages five social housing companies, including La Carolorégienne. On September 5, 2005, opposition councillor Olivier Chastel released an audit by the Walloon Housing Society. It criticized the management of La Carolorégienne. A more damaging report from 2002 was later revealed by journalist Christine Borowiak on RTBF radio (VivaCité) on September 15. It exposed evidence of fraud, leading to a judicial investigation.

That same day, after a police search of the company's offices, three senior officials—André Liesse (president), Claude Despiegeleer (managing director), and Serge Van Bergen (vice-president)—resigned. All were members of the ruling Socialist Party (PS), in power in Charleroi since 1977.

Shortly after, Liesse and Despiegeleer also stepped down as city aldermen. The investigation led to the indictment of Despiegeleer (who was jailed for over a month), Van Bergen, Liesse, and former senator Francis Poty, another vice-president of La Carolorégienne. Amid media pressure, Jean-Claude Van Cauwenberghe, then Minister-President of Wallonia and former mayor of Charleroi, resigned on September 30, 2005. During the scandal several political and administrative figures were investigated and prosecuted for financial misconduct.

On June 29, 2006, Serge Van Bergen was removed from office as alderman by a vote of no confidence. A few months later, on September 12, 2006, Luc Frère, the director of La Carolorégienne, was charged with forgery, misuse of company funds, embezzlement, and fraud. In July 2007, Jean-Claude Henrotin, who represented the Walloon Region at the company, was also charged for not reporting the company’s illegal activities.

On November 20, 2008, the Charleroi Council Chamber decided that several former aldermen—Claude Despiegeleer, Serge Van Bergen, and André Liesse—along with former senator Francis Poty and several staff members, would face trial. They were accused of misusing public money, forgery, embezzlement, and breaking public contract laws.

On June 23, 2010, the Charleroi criminal court sentenced Claude Despiegeleer to four years in prison, partly suspended, and fined him €16,500. Other people involved also received suspended sentences and fines. The court pointed to serious violations of public trust and democratic values, noting that Despiegeleer played a key role in the scandal.

== Carolo Bis – Embezzlement of public funds for sports clubs ==
The judiciary uncovered a scheme where public funds were funneled from the Autonomous Municipal Authority to sports clubs, bypassing council oversight. These funds paid contract workers who didn’t actually work for the organizations listed, such as Charleroi Infra Sports and Parc des Sports.

On May 24, 2006, (chief of staff to Mayor Jacques Van Gompel and president of volleyball team Les Dauphines) and Éric Somme (manager of basketball club Les Spirous) were charged with forgery, corruption, and embezzlement. A year later, six more people, including former aldermen and administrators, were also indicted.

By January 2010, around twenty individuals were sent to trial by the Charleroi Council Chamber.

== “Despi” and the Carcassonne Boiler ==
The case involves a boiler installed in late 2004 at a private residence in Carcassonne, owned by the sons of former Charleroi alderman Claude Despiegeleer. The €6,000 cost of the boiler was paid by the City of Charleroi. The payment raised suspicions of misuse of public funds.

As a result, Despiegeleer and his former deputy at the City, Jean-Pol Incecca, were charged with forgery and embezzlement. Prosecutors claimed they manipulated the process so the city would cover the cost.

The trial took place in late 2008 and early 2009. The defense challenged the legality of the investigation and claimed there was no direct proof linking Despiegeleer to the payment.

On 9 March 2009, the Charleroi criminal court sentenced Despiegeleer to one year in prison, suspended for five years, and a €25,000 fine, largely suspended. On 5 May 2010, the Mons Court of Appeal increased the sentence to two years, also suspended. A final appeal was rejected by the Court of Cassation.

== Public procurement scandal ==
For over a decade, public contracts in Charleroi were allegedly rigged by splitting tenders and using false purchase orders to favor certain companies.

In 2006, officials Patrick Roelandt and Jean-Pol Incecca were indicted, along with Mayor Jacques Van Gompel, who was charged with forgery and embezzlement. He resigned and was briefly jailed. Several other officials, including aldermen and senior civil servants, were also implicated.

On 8 March 2007, treasurer Pierre Oversteyns and secretary Eric Lecomte were charged with forgery. Both were released but suspended from their duties by the municipal council. Oversteyns was accused of processing backdated purchase orders signed by Mayor Jacques Van Gompel. Lecomte was charged with failing to verify the legality of the transactions.

On 30 March 2016, Van Gompel, Claude Despiegeleer, Marc Parmentier, and Eric Lecomte received declarations of guilt. Roelandt and Incecca were found guilty but spared sentencing due to political pressure. Demacq and Oversteyns were acquitted, as were most others, except Henri Stassen and Alain Denil.

== ICDI fraud and misuse of public funds case ==
The Intercommunale de Collecte et de Destruction des Immondices (ICDI), a public waste management body in Belgium, was at the center of a judicial investigation in the mid-2000s concerning allegations of forgery, misuse of public assets, and corruption.

Key figures involved included Lucien Cariat, then president of the ICDI and alderman for the environment in Charleroi, and Christian Blondeel, the financial director. Both were held in preventive detention for 45 days in 2006. The charges against them and other ICDI officials included:

- Signing false sponsorship agreements based on fabricated meeting minutes.
- Use of ICDI resources for private associations linked to Cariat.
- Illegal payments and travel expenses unrelated to ICDI activities.
- Double salary payments to Cariat despite a legal ban on holding both president and director roles.
- Fake meetings used to claim attendance fees.
- Preferential sale of an ICDI-owned building to the municipality of Gerpinnes.

In May 2007, several former board members, including local politicians Roland Marchal, Serge Omer, and Henri Lemarque, were formally charged.

Cariat was ultimately convicted in 2012 for forgery, embezzlement, abuse of public funds, and illegal staffing practices. He received a two-year suspended prison sentence, a €11,000 fine, and €100,000 was confiscated for the benefit of the ICDI.

In February 2007, Cariat was also charged over serious environmental breaches at the Couillet waste facility. Infractions included:

- Crushed asbestos (Eternit) sheets without any safety measures.
- Refrigerators dismantled without containing the release of harmful gases like Freon.

On April 26, 2012, the Charleroi criminal court found both Lucien Cariat and his son Luc (then director of the ICDI) guilty. The court ruled that financial convenience had been prioritized over environmental safety.

== Business affairs and their impact on local politics in Charleroi ==
After the local elections on October 8, 2006, a coalition was formed in Charleroi. It included the Socialist Party (PS), the Reformist Movement (MR), and the Humanist Democratic Centre (CDH). Léon Casaert became the mayor. The coalition did not last long. On May 28, 2007, two MR aldermen, Olivier Chastel and Philippe Sonnet, left the group. They said the PS was not loyal, especially in the case of Jean-Pol Demacq. Demacq, a PS alderman, was forced to resign after being charged with forgery. He stepped down. The resignations were made official at a special city council meeting on June 1.

On June 11, 2007, one day after federal elections, PS party leader Elio Di Rupo placed the Charleroi Socialist section under party supervision, assigning Paul Magnette to oversee the process. Di Rupo also called for the resignation of the mayor and all PS aldermen, which occurred the following day. The entire municipal executive, including CDH alderman Jean-Jacques Viseur, stepped down.

By June 18, 2007, many members of the previous city government were officially charged. This included former mayor Jacques Van Gompel and several current and former aldermen. They were accused of helping to create fake municipal records. This had reportedly gone on for years.

More people were charged in the following days, including CPAS president Marc Parmentier and city councillor Evelyne Druart. A new coalition was formed on July 9, 2007. The PS got seven aldermen, MR got two, and CDH got one. Jean-Jacques Viseur became the new mayor. Later, three more aldermen from the old PS-led team were also charged.

In February 2012, Viseur resigned for health reasons. Éric Massin became mayor. A new governing agreement was made.

On March 30, 2016, the court found all accused not guilty. The judge said their actions showed poor judgment but were not criminal.

== Media impact and misappropriated funds ==
Although the scandals in Charleroi received significant media attention and affected public opinion, journalist Didier Albin downplayed their scale compared to cases in other cities. He pointed, for example, to the case of Marbella, Spain, where authorities seized €2.4 billion in suspicious assets, dissolved the city council, arrested the former mayor, and detained five former councillors.

== See also ==
- List of Belgian political scandals
