= Sosnovy Bor, Leningrad Oblast =

Town in Leningrad Oblast, Russia

Sosnovy Bor Сосновый Бор
- Town
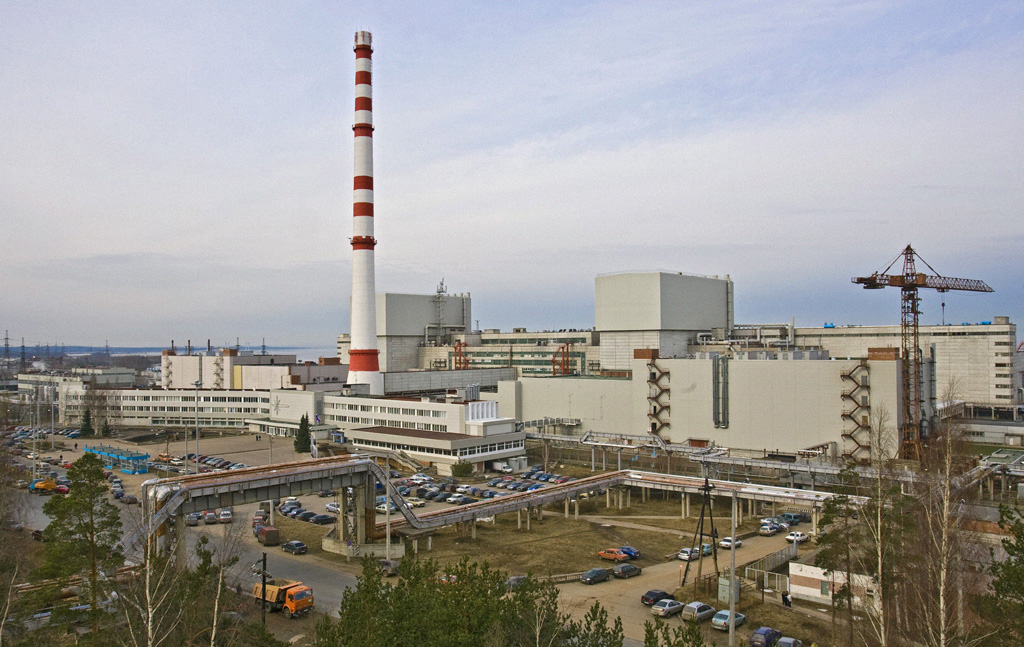
- Leningrad Nuclear Power Plant

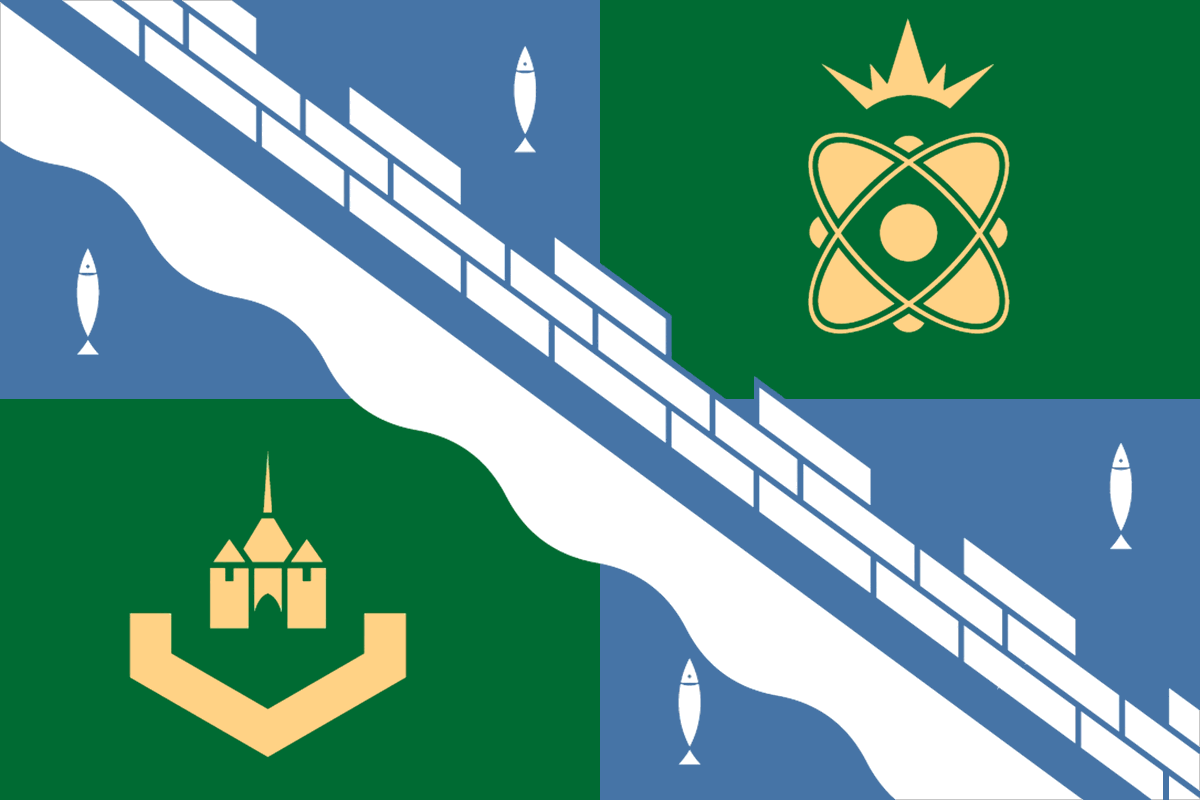
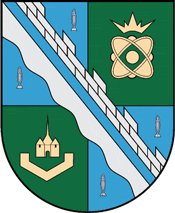
- Flag Coat of arms
- Interactive map of Sosnovy Bor
- Location of Sosnovy Bor Sosnovy Bor (Leningrad Oblast)
- Coordinates: 59°53′23″N 29°05′08″E
- Country: Russia
- Federal subject: Leningrad Oblast
- Urban-type settlement: 1958
- Town status since: 19 April 1973
- Elevation: 20 m (66 ft)

Population (2010 Census)
  - Total: 65,788
  - Estimate (2024): 63,462 (−3.5%)
  - Rank: 239th in 2010

Administrative status
  - Subordinated to: Sosnovoborsky Municipal Formation with Urban Okrug Status
  - Capital of: Sosnovoborsky Municipal Formation with Urban Okrug Status

Municipal status
  - Urban okrug: Sosnovoborsky Urban Okrug
  - Capital of: Sosnovoborsky Urban Okrug
- Time zone: UTC+3 (MSK)
- Postal codes: 188540, 188541
- Dialing code: +7 81369
- OKTMO ID: 41754000001
- Town Day: 19 April
- Website: www.sbor.ru

Sosnovy Bor (Russian: Сосно́вый Бор, lit. pine forest) is a town in Leningrad Oblast, Russia, situated on the Koporye Bay of the Gulf of Finland, 81 kilometers (50 mi) west of St. Petersburg. The town of Sosnovy Bor is surrounded by Lomonosovsky District. Population: 65,788 (2010 census); 66,132 (2002 census); 55,800 (1989 Soviet census).

== History ==
It was founded in 1958 as urban-type settlement serving the Leningrad Nuclear Power Plant and granted urban-settlement status on 10 December 1958. At the time, it was a part of Lomonosovsky District of Leningrad Oblast. On 19 April 1973, Sosnovy Bor was granted town status and became a town of oblast significance, after which it was no longer a part of Lomonosovsky District.

=== Timeline ===
- 1958 Sosnovy Bor founded
- 1961 A branch of the Leningrad Special Purpose Combine "Radon" was created. Today this is the state-owned corporation for collection, processing and long-term storage of radioactive waste.
- 1962 State Station tor testing of marine nuclear power plants was created as a branch of Kurchatov's Institute for Atomic Energy (IAE). In 1966 it became Scientific and Technological Research Institute (NITI in Russian)
- 1963 A branch of S. I. Vavilov's State Optical Institution was built.
- 1966 North Construction Administration (Russian Северное управление строительства, СУС) was created. Its major goal was building the Leningrad Nuclear Power Plant.
- 19 April 1973 Sosnovy Bor was granted town status. This date is now the town's holiday.
- 23 December 1973 The first reactor of Leningrad Nuclear Power Plant produced its first power.
- 1981 The fourth reactor of the LNPP was started. LNPP became the largest world nuclear power plant (4 GW)
- 1996 First mayor elected.

== Restricted access ==
Due to high concentration of classified research facilities, nuclear energy industries, and military installations, access to Sosnovy Bor is only by special permit (except for the inhabitants of the town).

== Administrative and municipal status ==
Within the framework of administrative divisions, it is incorporated as Sosnovoborsky Municipal Formation with Urban Okrug Status—an administrative unit with the status equal to that of the districts. As a municipal division, Sosnovoborsky Municipal Formation with Urban Okrug Status is incorporated as Sosnovoborsky Urban Okrug.

== Economy ==
=== Industry ===
Sosnovy Bor is known for its research institutes and construction industry. There are about five hundred large, medium, and small enterprises functioning in the town. In 2005, the working capital investment grew by 15%.

The most prominent organizations in Sosnovy Bor include:

- Leningrad Nuclear Power Plant which provides district heating for the town;
- Alexandrov Research Technological Institute — a state-owned research facility mostly dedicated to development and testing of nuclear ships and submarines power plants;
- Nuclear waste disposal facility: branch of the state-owned "Russian Radioactive Waste" ("РосРАО");
- Former Branch of the State Optical Institution, now a separate "Research Institute for Complex Testing of Optoelectronic Devices and Systems".

=== Transportation ===
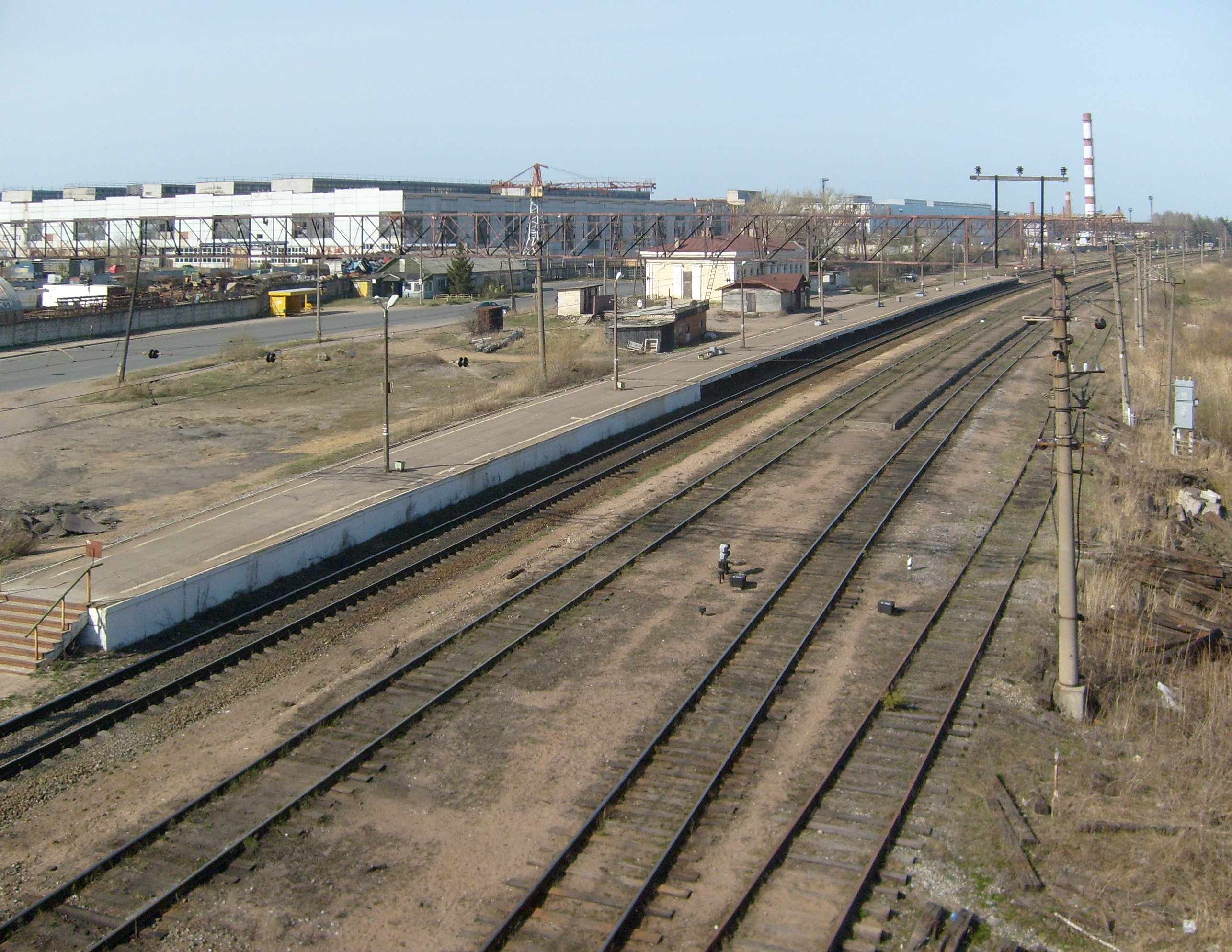
Kalishche railway station

Sosnovy Bor is located on the railway connecting the Baltiysky railway station of Saint Petersburg with Veymarn. There are two railway stations in the town, Kalishche railway station and 80 km railway platform. Both are served by suburban connections from Saint Petersburg. West of Kalishche, there is no passenger service.

The town is connected by road to Saint Petersburg via Lebyazhye, and is included in the dense road network south of Sosnovy Bor, which, in particular, provides access to Kingisepp and Volosovo.

== Sports and education ==
Town's educational facilities include fourteen kindergartens, eleven schools (two of them private), one children's shelter (state-subsidized boarding school for abandoned children), five secondary schools, one polytechnic lyceum, and three branches of St. Petersburg-based universities.

107 sports organizations and 11 civil society organizations are registered in the town.
