= Muroosystems =

Japanese information technology company

Muroosystems Corporation
- Native name: 株式会社ムロオシステムズ
- Company type: Private
- Industry: Information technology
- Founded: June 2006; 20 years ago
- Headquarters: Nihonbashi-Honcho, Chūō-ku, Tokyo, Japan
- Revenue: JPY 4.6 billion (FY2024, consolidated)
- Number of employees: 60 (2025)
- Website: group.muroosystems.com

Muroosystems Corporation (Japanese: 株式会社ムロオシステムズ) is a Japanese information technology company headquartered in Tokyo. Founded in 2006, the company operates in digital transformation (DX), decentralized computing infrastructure, and renewable energy-related projects.

== History ==
Muroosystems was established in June 2006 in Hiroshima Prefecture as an internal IT venture originating from the logistics sector. The company initially focused on web conferencing and logistics-related IT systems before relocating its headquarters to Tokyo and expanding its business scope.

During the 2010s, Muroosystems expanded overseas, including activities in China and Central Asia, providing IT solutions and participating in cross-border digital and infrastructure projects.

== Business activities ==
The company's core activities include enterprise digital transformation services, decentralized computing centers (DCC), and energy-efficient infrastructure systems. In 2023, a blockchain-based international trade platform developed by Muroosystems was selected under Japan's Ministry of Economy, Trade and Industry (METI) trade digitalization support program.

== Nuclear engineering expansion ==
In October 2024, Muroosystems acquired Nukem Technologies GmbH, a German engineering firm specializing in nuclear decommissioning and radioactive waste management. The transaction was reported by multiple independent industry and national media outlets, marking the company's entry into the nuclear engineering sector.

== International cooperation ==
Muroosystems has been involved in government-level cooperation projects in Central Asia. In Kyrgyzstan, the company participated in renewable energy initiatives, including hydropower development discussions reported by regional and international media.

In April 2025, the Ministry of Energy of Turkmenistan and Muroosystems signed a memorandum of understanding covering cooperation on surplus energy utilization and technical collaboration.

On 20 December 2025, Uzbekistan's Atomic Energy Agency (Uzatom) announced a joint initiative with Muroosystems to develop a large-scale data center concept powered exclusively by small modular reactors (SMRs). According to official statements and independent reporting, the planned facility would operate with a continuous load of approximately 50 megawatts without connection to the national power grid, positioning it among the earliest proposed examples of direct integration between nuclear energy and computing infrastructure.
