= Chernobyl Reactors 5 and 6 =

Unfinished reactors in Chernobyl, Ukraine

Chernobyl Nuclear Power Plant, Reactors 5 and 6
- Incomplete reactors No. 5 and No. 6.
- Official name: SSE Chernobyl Nuclear Power Plant, Reactors 5 and 6
- Country: Ukraine
- Location: near Pripyat, Kyiv Oblast
- Coordinates: 51°22′53″N 30°07′09″E
- Status: Construction never completed
- Construction began: 1 July 1981 (Reactor 5); 1 July 1983 (Reactor 6)
- Owner: Soviet Union / Minister of Energy: Aleksei Makukhin

Nuclear power station
- Reactors: 2 (incomplete)
- Reactor type: RBMK-1000
- Thermal capacity: 2 × 3,200 MWt

Power generation
- Nameplate capacity: 2,000 MW (planned)

External links
- Website: chnpp.gov.ua

Chernobyl Reactors 5 and 6 are incomplete reactors, a part of Chernobyl Nuclear Power Plant's third generation phase. Intended as RBMK-1000 units capable of approximately 1,000 megawatts each, construction began on 1 July 1981 and was partially completed by the time of the Chernobyl disaster on 26 April 1986. The reactors were abandoned afterwards, with the decommissioning of the Chernobyl Plant in 2000 ending the possibility of their completion.

== History ==
Chernobyl Nuclear Power Plant's original Soviet plan consisted of 12 units, and that units 5 and 6 were phase three of the plan. At the time, only two phases were complete, reactors 1, 2, 3 and 4. Both units were intended to be RBMK-1000 and would generate approximately 1,000 megawatts each, and also be supported by two cooling towers located south-east from the reactors. They were side-by-side in the same way as reactors 3–4 were built. They also shared a water chemistry plant, a gas circuit plant, and an engine hall.

On 1 July 1981, construction on the fifth unit began with an estimated cost of 500 million Soviet rubles. Russian hydrotechnical design firm, Hydroproject (Gidroproject) was in charge of the construction of both units. Unit 6 also shortly began on 1 July 1983. Unit 5 was scheduled to become operational on 7 November 1986, and reactor 6 in 1994 inside a new block of buildings. The two RBMK-1000 units measured 11.8 m (39 ft) tall and 7 m (23 ft) in diameter, and were installed with two large portal cranes.

The cooling pond used by units 1 to 4 was not big enough, and engineers saw that it was not possible to expand the pond. It was decided that constructing two cooling towers would be less costly and more efficient. In May 1984, the responsible fire department of Kyiv Oblast criticised the fire safety in the two units, which was not planned according to regulatory standards. While corresponding adjustments were mandated, the deficiencies were not addressed by the designer, Gidroproject. In February 1985, an accident occurred at Block 5 when a 2-metre (6 ft 7 in) thick roof slab measuring 24 by 21 metres (79 ft × 69 ft) and weighing 49 tonnes (48 long tons; 54 short tons) came loose from its anchorage and fell. This was due to a miscalculation, and the repair of the slab cost 7,300 rubles.

At 8 am of the Chernobyl Nuclear Disaster, 286 construction workers continued construction work, unaware of the disaster as the glow of fire was not visible. Construction work soon stopped, only to resume on 10 October 1986, however six months later on 24 April 1987, the work was halted again. During an unprecedented public hearing in April 1987, over 60 experts and scientists from the Ukrainian Academy of Science signed a petition opposing the completion of units 5 and 6 to the Ministry of Atomic Energy. They opposed the construction as it took place on environmental grounds, and feared that radiation could spread even more. Finally on 23 May 1989, a decision was made to discontinue the construction of both reactors, writing off 500 million rubles. At the time, reactor 5 was approximately 70% completed, while reactor 6 was only 20% completed. The dismantling of both units was rushed, as radiation levels were increasing, and no record has been made if the holding pools in unit 5 ever received the depleted uranium fuel bars.

== Present ==
In 2021, a research team dispatched a drone from Flyability named Elios 2 equipped with thermal cameras and a bright LED camera. The Chernobyl Decommissioning Team needed to know if there was any leftover uranium, making the purpose to investigate if there was any uranium leaks since its last inspection in 1986. Inspections made by foot was made unfeasible, as all points of entries were high off of the ground to where the holding pools were located. Elios 2 successfully completed the survey, and found no leftover uranium waste in the pools. These findings were found to be significant, and the Chernobyl Decommissioning Team submitted the video recording to international authorities regarding the reactor's status.

=== Current status ===
Unit 5 in the background with the flooded foundation of Unit 6 in the foreground.

Following the disaster, both units were mothballed, and unit 6 only had a flooded foundation with lower levels already built at the time. Many portal cranes and dock cranes were left in place since 1989. Chernobyl Reactor 5 was initially abandoned after the 1986 disaster, but final decisions to halt work occurred in 1989 as safety and cost concerns grew. The Ukrainian government fully decommissioned the Chernobyl Nuclear Power Plant in 2000, closing down operations of the remaining active reactors and stopping any possible revival of Reactors 5 and 6. During the 30th anniversary of the Chernobyl disaster, Australian artist Guido van Helten painted a photograph taken in 1986 by photojournalist Igor Kostin of the reactor onto the side of the coolant tower.
