= Parliamentary inquiry in Belgium =

The Chamber of Representatives, the lower house of the Belgian Federal Parliament, has the right to conduct parliamentary inquiries pursuant to article 56 of the Belgian Constitution. The Senate also had a right to enquiry until 2014. Committees of inquiry were rarely set up until 20 years ago, and have been used increasingly in the recent past, dealing with matters deemed of major public concern or apparent governmental failure.

The regional parliaments of Belgium also have the right to conduct parliamentary inquiries.

== Inquiries by the Chamber of Representatives ==
Below are mentioned most but not all inquiries by the Chamber of Representatives before 1998.

=== 1880: Education reform and legislation ===
May 5, 1880: Parliamentary inquiry commission concerning the moral and material situation of Belgium's primary education system, the results of the law of July 1, 1879, and the means used to inhibit implementation of this law.

=== 1909: Draft legislation ===
March 10, 1909: Parliamentary inquiry in order to resolve the outcomes of the law of May 21, 1902 (a change in the militia law and the law on compensation for drafted men).

=== 1935: Monetary devaluation ===
April 17, 1935: Parliamentary inquiry to determine the responsibilities in the devaluation of the Belgian franc, as set down in the law passed March 30, 1935 and the Royal Decree of March 31, 1935.

=== 1959: Leopoldstad ===
January 15, 1959: Parliamentary inquiry commission concerning the riots that took place in Léopoldville/Leopoldstad in January 1959.

=== 1972: Publicity on state-run television networks ===
June 18, 1972: Parliamentary inquiry commission on the direct or indirect addition of commercial texts or imagery in the broadcasts of the BRT, the RTB, and cable television.

=== 1985: Handling of Heysel Stadium disaster ===
June 6, 1985: Parliamentary inquiry commission to the causes, the circumstances, and the lessons that should be drawn from the tragic events that took place on May 29, 1985, during the football match between Liverpool and Juventus Turin (the Heysel Stadium disaster).

=== 1987: Arms sales to embargoed countries ===
April 9, 1987: Parliamentary inquiry commission for research on the Belgian arms and munition sales to countries in armed conflicts, or against which a weapons embargo is in place.

=== 1988: Fraud and non-proliferation treaty breaches ===
March 17, 1988: Parliamentary inquiry commission for the study of the range, the causes, and the results of possible fraud and of possible violations of the Non-Proliferation Treaty by the Studiecentrum voor Kernenergie (SCK), and related companies (see the Transnuklear scandal).

=== 1988: Handling of major crime and terrorism ===
April 21, 1988: Parliamentary inquiry commission to research methods of opposing banditry and terrorism.

=== 1988: Arms sales to embargoed countries ===
June 16, 1988: Parliamentary inquiry commission for research into Belgian arms and munition sales to countries in armed conflicts, or against which a weapons embargo has been declared.

=== 1992: Human trafficking ===
November 26, 1992: Parliamentary enquiry commission to research a structural policy concerning punishment for and eradication of human trafficking.

=== 1992: Waste transport ===
March 5, 1992: Parliamentary inquiry commission concerning import, export, and transport of industrial and domestic waste substances.

A similar inquiry committee was established in the Walloon Regional Council in 1994.

=== 1993: Military purchases ===
June 17, 1993: Parliamentary inquiry commission to investigate army purchases.

=== 1995: Handling of the Nijvel gang case ===
June 13, 1995: Parliamentary inquiry commission to look into the necessary adjustments in the organisation and workings of the police and justice system, based on the difficulties that arose during the attacks of the Nijvel gang.

=== 1996: Policy regarding sects ===
March 6, 1996: Parliamentary inquiry commission on the formation of policy to combat illegal practices of sects, to reduce the danger to society and to minors in particular.

=== 1996: Handling of the Dutroux/Nihoul case ===
October 17, 1996: Parliamentary inquiry commission to research the way the inquiries were conducted by the police and the court in the case "Dutroux-Nihoul and their likes".

=== 1996: Murder of André Cools ===
October 24, 1996: Parliamentary inquiry commission to research the murder of André Cools. Cools was a Belgian socialist politician who was assassinated at Liège in 1991.

=== 2016: Kazakhgate ===
December 1, 2016: Establishment of an inquiry commission on Kazakhgate.

== Inquiries by the Senate ==
The Senate had the right of inquiry until 2014.

=== 1951: Tax collection ===
March 1, 1951: Parliamentary inquiry commission on the activities of the service of the Sequester.

=== 1980: Militia activity ===
June 19, 1980: Parliamentary inquiry commission concerning the problems related to private militias and keeping order.

=== 1987: Arms sales to embargoed countries ===
April 7, 1987: Parliamentary enquiry commission to research the circumstances in which Belgium would have been involved in trade and trafficking of weapons and munition, either directly or indirectly, to countries the government has decided to place under embargo.

=== 1988: Nuclear security ===
March 23, 1988: Parliamentary inquiry commission to research and evaluate the guidelines regarding to nuclear security, the measures taken for education and protection of the population, and the means of evacuation in case of elevated radioactivity within the country's territories.

=== 1990: Gladio network ===
December 20, 1990: Parliamentary inquiry commission to research the discovery of the existence of a secret international intelligence network in Belgium under the name of "Gladio".

The Belgian branch of Operation Gladio was a secret military unit trained to form a resistance movement in the event of a communist invasion by the Soviet Union. Its existence became publicly known on November 14, 1990, when Defense minister Guy Coëme announced its existence in Belgium, following Italian Premier Giulio Andreotti's revelations concerning the Italian branch of Gladio.

Because questions and allegations where raised regarding its functioning and oversight, and possible connections between Gladio-operatives and criminal and terroristic activities in Belgium during the previous decade, a parliamentary inquiry was initiated.

=== 1996: Organized crime activity ===
July 18, 1996: Parliamentary inquiry commission for research into organised crime in Belgium.

=== 1997: Rwanda inquiry ===
January 23, 1997: Establishment of a special commission on Rwanda.

== See also ==
- Belgian political scandals
