= Chernobyl Nuclear Power Plant =

Decommissioned nuclear power plant in Ukraine

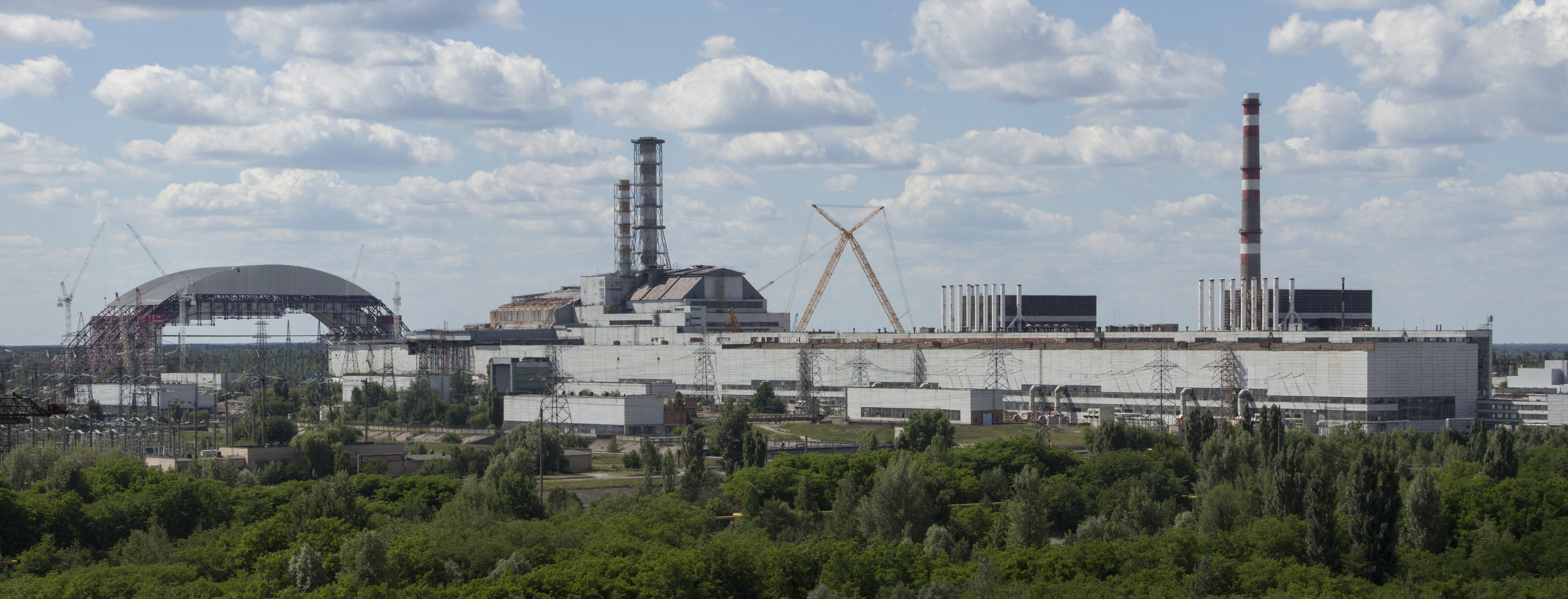
- View of the plant in 2013. From L to R New Safe Confinement under construction and reactors 4 to 1.
- Official name: SSE Chernobyl Nuclear Power Plant
- Country: Ukraine
- Location: near Pripyat, Kyiv Oblast
- Coordinates: 51°23′21″N 30°05′58″E
- Status: Undergoing decommissioning since 2015
- Construction began: 15 August 1972
- Commission date: 26 September 1977
- Decommission date: 1986 (Unit 4); 1991 (Unit 2); 1996 (Unit 1); 2000 (Unit 3)

Nuclear power station
- Reactors: 4 (plus 2 uncompleted)
- Reactor type: RBMK-1000
- Annual revenue: 44,504,000 ₴ (2025)
- Thermal capacity: 12,800 MW

Power generation
- Units decommissioned: 1 × 800 MW; 3 × 1000 MW
- Nameplate capacity: 3,515 MW

External links
- Website: chnpp.gov.ua
- Commons: Related media on Commons

The Chernobyl Nuclear Power Plant (Note: Ukrainian: Чорнобильська атомна електростанція, romanized: Chornobylska atomna elektrostantsiia; Russian: Чернобыльская атомная электростанция, romanized: Chernobylskaya atomnaya elektrostantsiya) (ChNPP) is a former nuclear power plant undergoing decommissioning. ChNPP is located near the abandoned city of Pripyat in northern Ukraine, 16.5 kilometres (10 mi) northwest of the city of Chernobyl, 16 kilometres (10 mi) from the Belarus–Ukraine border, and about 100 kilometres (62 mi) north of Kyiv. The plant was cooled by an engineered pond, fed by the Pripyat River about 5 kilometres (3 mi) northwest from its juncture with the Dnieper River. The RBMK type graphite-moderated reactor used in this plant is considered an unusual design. It prioritizes cost efficiency over safety compared to other reactor designs, such as the VVER pressurized water reactor.

Originally named the Chernobyl Nuclear Power Plant of V. I. Lenin (Note: Ukrainian: Чорнобильська атомна електростанція ім. В.І. Леніна Russian: Чернобыльская АЭС имени В. И. Ленина) after the founding leader of the Soviet Union, the plant was commissioned in phases with the four reactors entering commercial operation between 1978 and 1984. On 26 April 1986, in what became known as the Chernobyl disaster, reactor No. 4 suffered a catastrophic explosion and meltdown; as a result of this, the power plant is now within a large restricted area known as the Chernobyl exclusion zone. Both the zone and the power plant are administered by the State Agency of Ukraine on Exclusion Zone Management. The three other reactors remained operational post-accident maintaining a capacity factor between 60 and 70%. In total, units 1 and 3 had supplied 98 terawatt-hours of electricity each, with unit 2 slightly less at 75 TWh. In 1991, unit 2 was placed into a permanent shutdown state by the plant's operator due to complications resulting from a turbine fire. This was followed by Unit 1 in 1996 and Unit 3 in 2000. Their closures were largely attributed to foreign pressures. In 2013, the plant's operator announced that units 1–3 were fully defueled, and in 2015 entered the decommissioning phase, during which equipment contaminated during the operational period of the power station will be removed. This process is expected to take until 2065 according to the plant's operator. Although the reactors have all ceased generation, Chernobyl maintains a large workforce as the ongoing decommissioning process requires constant management.

From 24 February to 31 March 2022, Russian troops occupied the plant as part of their invasion of Ukraine.

== Construction ==
In 1966, plans to construct Chernobyl Nuclear Power Plant were first conceived, during the development of nuclear production of energy in the Soviet Union. Construction of the Chernobyl Nuclear Power Plant began in 1972. There were several motivating factors for building the plant including: preventing an electricity deficit in Ukraine and trying to move away from fossil-fuels for electricity production. The plant was meant to be the first of four built in Ukraine between 1971 and 1975. The plant was meant to have 12 units, made up of six construction phases, and if completed would have been the largest nuclear power plant in the world. The plant would eventually consist of four RBMK-1000 reactors, each capable of producing 1,000 megawatts (MW) of electric power (3,200 MW of thermal power), and the four together produced about 10% of Ukraine's electricity. Like other sites which housed multiple RBMK reactors such as Kursk, the construction of the plant was also accompanied by the construction of a nearby city to house workers and their families. In the case of the ChNPP, the new city was Pripyat. During construction, a mobile crane was deployed and was used to lift pre-fabricated builds weighing up to 640 tons. It was the only crane of such design in the country, and was also used to install the nuclear reactor. Over 20 specialized organizations involved with the construction were working simultaneously, specializing in electric wiring, heat insulation, hydraulic engineers, chemical protection, etc. The work would be coordinated and directed by the headquarters, which was managed by site manager Vasilii Trofimovich Kizima. Most welders formerly served in the tank forces, which gave them endurance training prior to becoming construction workers at Chernobyl. Concrete pouring was done as high as 50 meters above ground level, and the Komsomol-and-youth brigade of Viacheslav Volkov completed carcassing the reactor shaft by 1974.

Plant construction had a variety of issues including: a lack of materials and even the usage of inferior materials, shortage of workers and falling behind schedule despite being rushed. As the plant was falling behind schedule, building safety was neglected in the construction project.

=== Operations ===
Construction of the station concluded in the late 1970s, with reactor No. 1 being commissioned in 1977. It was the third Soviet RBMK nuclear power plant, after the Leningrad and Kursk power plants, and the first plant on Ukrainian soil. The completion of the first reactor in 1977 was followed by reactor No. 2 in 1978, No. 3 in 1981, and No. 4 in 1983. Two more blocks, numbered five and six, of more or less the same reactor design, were planned at a site roughly a kilometre from the contiguous buildings of the four older blocks. This is similar to the layout of units 5 and 6 at Kursk and shows the similarity in design between the RBMK sites. Reactor No. 5 was around 70% complete at the time of Reactor 4's explosion and was scheduled to come online approximately seven months later, in November 1986. In the aftermath of the disaster, construction on No. 5 and 6 was suspended, and eventually cancelled on April 20, 1989, days before the third anniversary of the 1986 explosion. At one point six other reactors were planned on the other side of the river, bringing the total to twelve.

Reactors No. 3 and 4 were second-generation units, whereas No. 1 and 2 were first-generation units, like those in operation at the Kursk power plant. Second-generation RBMK designs were fitted with a more secure containment structure, visible in photos of the facility.

== Units ==
Phase	Unit No.	Reactor		Status	Capacity in MWe		Construction began	First criticality	Grid Connection	Commercial operation	Closure	Notes
Phase	Unit No.	Type	Model	Status	Net	Gross	Construction began	First criticality	Grid Connection	Commercial operation	Closure	Notes
I	1	Light water graphite reactor (LWGR)	RBMK	Shut down/in decommissioning	725	800	1972	1977	1977	1977	30th November 1996	Derated to 800MWe following the 1982 partial meltdown
I	2	Light water graphite reactor (LWGR)	RBMK	Shut down/in decommissioning	925	1000	1972	1978	1978	1978	11th October 1991	Shutdown following turbine fire
I	3	Light water graphite reactor (LWGR)	RBMK	Shut down/in decommissioning	925	1000	1975	1981	1981	1981	15th December 2000	The last unit to operate at ChNPP
I	4	Light water graphite reactor (LWGR)	RBMK	Destroyed	925	1000	1975	1983	1983	1983	26th April 1986	Exploded
II	5	Light water graphite reactor (LWGR)	RBMK	Unfinished	925	1000	1982	—N/a	—N/a	—N/a	1989	Construction stopped after the disaster
II	6	Light water graphite reactor (LWGR)	RBMK	Unfinished	925	1000	1982	—N/a	—N/a	—N/a	1989	Construction stopped after the disaster

== Design ==
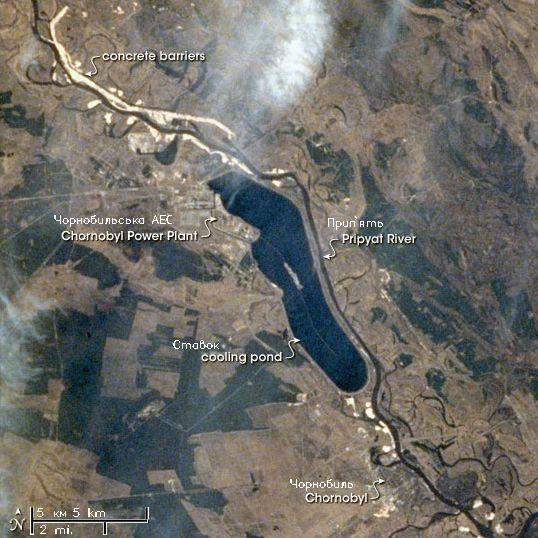
Topography of Chernobyl Nuclear Power Plant, documented by photograph from space station Mir in 1997

=== Electrical systems ===
The power plant is connected to the 330 kV and 750 kV electrical grid. The block has two electrical generators connected to the 750 kV grid by a single generator transformer. The generators are connected to their common transformer by two switches in series. Between them, the unit transformers are connected to supply power to the power plant's own systems; each generator can therefore be connected to the unit transformer to power the plant, or to the unit transformer and the generator transformer to also feed power to the grid.

The 330 kV line was normally not used, and served as an external power supply, connected to a station's transformer – meaning to the power plant's electrical systems. The plant was powered by its own generators, or at any event got power from the 750 kV national grid through the main grid backup feed in the transformer, or from the 330 kV level feed in grid transformer 2, or from the other power plant blocks via two reserve busbars. In case of total external power loss, the essential systems could be powered by diesel generators. Each unit's transformer is therefore connected to two 6 kV main power line switchboards, A and B (e.g., 7A, 7B, 8A, 8B for generators 7 and 8), powering principal essential systems and connected to even another transformer at 4 kV, which is backed up twice (4 kV reserve busbar).

The 7A, 7B, and 8B boards are also connected to the three essential power lines (for the coolant pumps), each also having its own diesel generator. In case of a coolant circuit failure with simultaneous loss of external power, the essential power can be supplied by spinning down turbogenerators for about 45 to 50 seconds, during which time the diesel generators should start. The generators were started automatically within 15 seconds at loss of off-site power.

=== Turbo generators ===
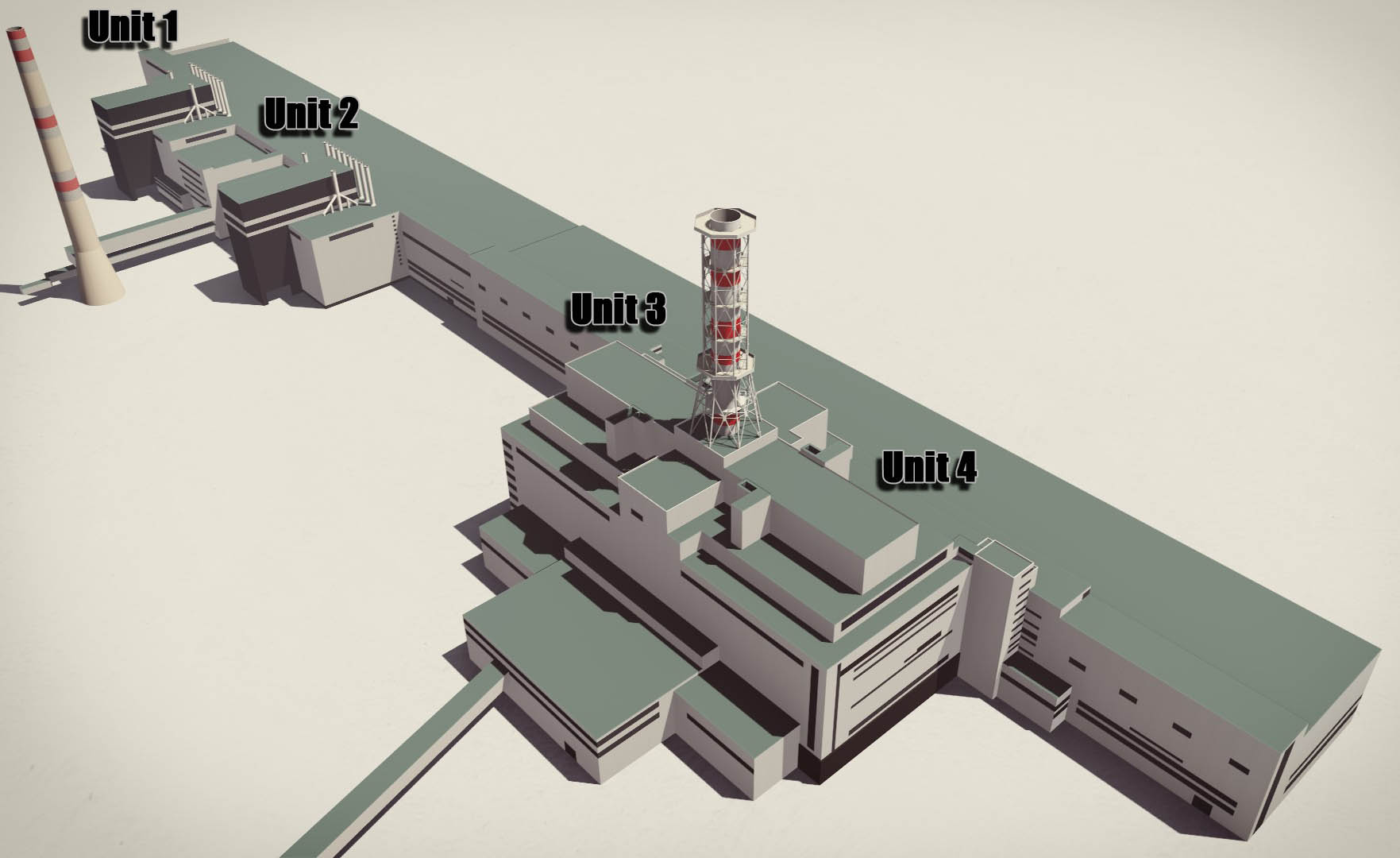
Computer-generated synthesis drawing of all 4 units prior to the accident viewed from NW

Electrical energy was generated by a pair of 2x500 MW hydrogen-cooled turbo generators per unit. These are located in the 600 metres (1,969 ft)-long machine hall, adjacent to the reactor building. The turbines—the venerable five-cylinder K-500-65/3000 steam turbine were supplied by the Kharkiv turbine plant; the electrical generators are the TBB-500. The turbine and the generator rotors are mounted on the same shaft; the combined weight of the rotors is almost 200 tonnes (220 short tons) and their speed was 3,000 revolutions per minute.

The turbo generator is 39 m (128 ft) long and its total weight is 1,200 t (1,300 short tons). The coolant flow for each turbine is 82,880 t/h. The generator produced 20 kV 50 Hz AC power. The generator's stator was cooled by water while its rotor was cooled by hydrogen. The hydrogen for the generators was manufactured on-site by electrolysis. The design and reliability of the turbines earned them the State Prize of Ukraine for 1979.

The Kharkiv turbine plant later developed a new version of the turbine, K-500-65/3000-2, in an attempt to reduce use of valuable metal. The Chernobyl plant was equipped with both types of turbines; block 4 had the newer ones. The newer turbines, however, turned out to be more sensitive to their operating parameters, and their bearings had frequent problems with vibrations.

=== Reactor fleet ===
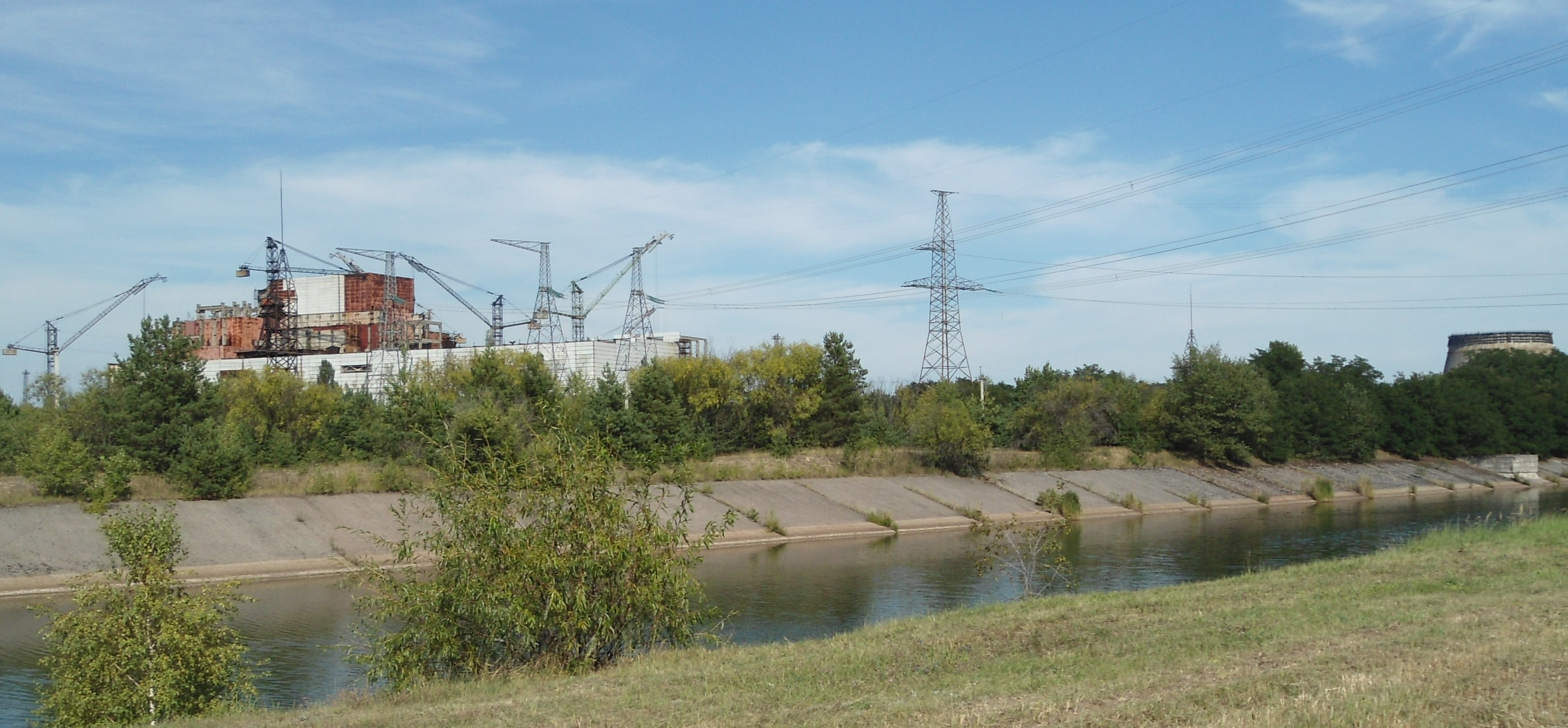
Incomplete reactors No. 5 and 6

The construction of two partially completed reactors, No. 5 and 6, were suspended immediately after the accident at reactor No. 4, and eventually cancelled in 1989. Reactors No. 1 and 3 continued to operate after the disaster. Reactor No. 2 was permanently shut down in 1991 after a fire broke out due to a faulty switch in a turbine. Reactors No. 1 and 3 were to be eventually closed due to a 1995 agreement Ukraine made with the European Union.

Ukraine agreed to close the remaining units in exchange for EU assistance in modernizing the shelter over reactor No. 4 and improving the energy sector of the country, including the completion of two new nuclear reactors, Khmelnytskyi 2 and Rivne 4. Reactor No. 1 was shut down in 1996 with No. 3 following in 2000.

=== Computer systems ===
SKALA (Russian: СКАЛА, система контроля аппарата Ленинградской Атомной; sistema kontrolya apparata Leningradskoj Atomnoj, "Control system of the device of the Leningrad Nuclear [Power Plant]", lit. "rock") was the process computer for the RBMK nuclear reactor at the Chernobyl nuclear power plant prior to October 1995. Dating to the 1960s, it used magnetic-core memory, magnetic tape data storage, and punched tape for loading software.

SKALA monitored and recorded reactor conditions and control board inputs. It was wired to accept 7200 analog signals and 6500 digital signals. The system continuously monitored the plant and displayed this information to operators. Additionally, a program called PRIZMA (Russian: ПРИЗМА, программа измерения мощности аппарата; programma izmereniya moshchnosti apparata, "Device power measurement program", lit. "prism") processed plant conditions and made recommendations to guide plant operators. This program took 5 to 10 minutes to run, and could not directly control the reactor.

== Known accidents and incidents ==
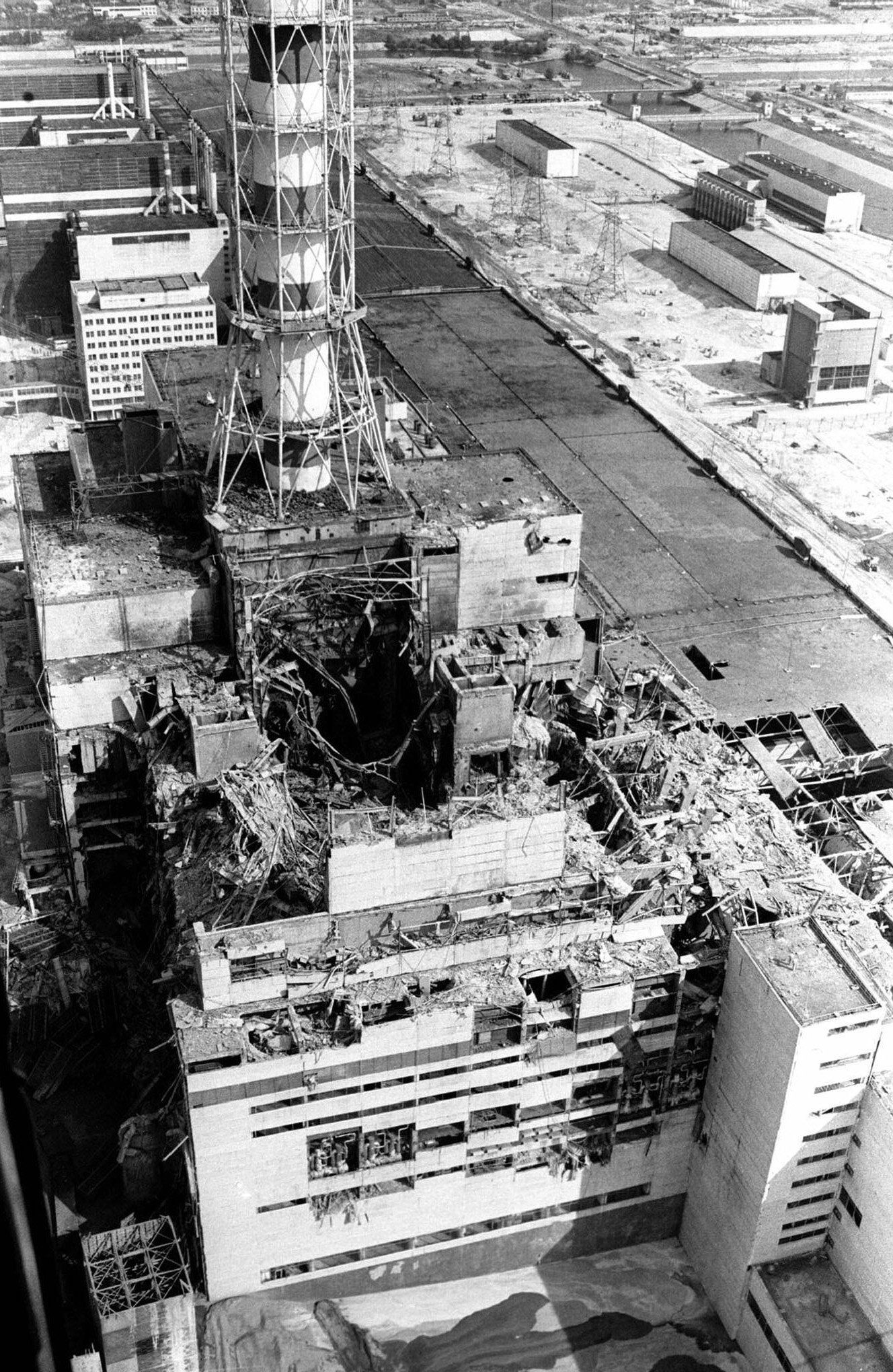
The Chernobyl #4 reactor was catastrophically destroyed on 26 April 1986. This photo was taken of the ruins of Chernobyl Nuclear Power Plant Reactor #4 during the construction of the Sarcophagus in the late summer of 1986.

=== 1982 reactor #1 partial meltdown ===
On 9 September 1982, a partial core meltdown occurred in reactor No. 1 due to a faulty cooling valve remaining closed following maintenance. Once the reactor came online, the uranium in the channel 13-44 overheated and ruptured. The extent of the damage was comparatively minor, and no one was killed during the accident. However, due to the negligence of the operators, the accident was not noticed until several hours later, resulting in significant release of radiation in the form of fragments of uranium oxide and several other radioactive isotopes escaping with steam from the reactor via the ventilation stack. This accident was somewhat similar to the 1975 Leningrad unit 1 accident. The accident was not made public until several years later, despite cleanups taking place in and around the power station and Pripyat. The reactor was repaired and put back into operation after eight months with its capacity reduced by 20% to 800MWe.

=== 1984 reactor #3 and #4 incident ===
According to KGB documents declassified in Ukraine on 26 April 2021, serious incidents occurred in the third and fourth reactors in 1984. According to these documents, the central government in Moscow knew as early as 1983 that the powerplant was "one of the most dangerous nuclear powerplants in the USSR". The reasoning behind this had to do with the building's structural integrity. The room which housed the steam separators would reach temperatures as high as 270 degrees Celsius. This excess heat caused the concrete of the building to shift its position, which made the building unsafe and could potentially result in the collapse of the steam separators, which would cause it to collapse onto the reactor hall, causing a meltdown.

=== 1986 reactor #4 catastrophe (Chernobyl disaster) ===
On 26 April 1986, reactor No. 4 suffered a catastrophic meltdown during a safety test resulting in a core explosion and open-air fires. This caused large quantities of radioactive materials to be dispersed in the atmosphere and surrounding land. The radioactive cloud spread as far away as Norway. The disaster is regarded as the worst accident in the history of nuclear power.

The destroyed reactor was encased in a concrete and lead sarcophagus in 1986, followed in 2016 by a large steel confinement shelter to prevent further escape of radioactivity.

=== 1991 reactor #2 turbine fire ===
Unit # 2 (video shot in 2016)

Reactor No. 2 was permanently shut down shortly after October 1991 when a fire broke out due to a faulty switch in a turbine.

On 11 October 1991, a fire broke out in the turbine hall of reactor No. 2. The fire began in reactor No. 2's fourth turbine, while the turbine was being idled for repairs. A faulty switch caused a surge of current to the generator, igniting insulating material on some electrical wiring. This subsequently led to hydrogen, used as a coolant in the synchronous generator, being leaked into the turbine hall "which apparently created the conditions for fire to start in the roof and for one of the trusses supporting the roof to collapse." The adjacent reactor hall and reactor were unaffected, but due to the political climate it was decided to shut down this reactor permanently after this incident.

=== 2017 Petya cyberattack ===
The 2017 Petya cyberattack affected the radiation monitoring system and took down the power plant's official website, which hosts information about the incident and the area.

=== Russian invasion of Ukraine ===
The Chernobyl exclusion zone was the site of fighting between Russian and Ukrainian forces during the Battle of Chernobyl as part of the Russian invasion of Ukraine. On 24 February 2022, Russian forces captured the plant. The resulting activity reportedly led to a 20-fold increase of detected radiation levels in the area due to disturbance of contaminated soil.

On 9 March 2022, there was a power cut at the plant itself. No radiation leaks were reported at the time. However, Ukrainian authorities reported that there was a risk of a radiation leak due to spent fuel coolant being unable to circulate properly.

On 31 March 2022, Russian forces formally handed control of the plant back to its employees, and most occupying forces withdrew. Ukrainian National Guard personnel were moved to Belarus as prisoners of war. On 2 April 2022, Ukrainian media reported that the flag of Ukraine was raised at the plant.

Russian troops dug trenches and other fighting positions on the outskirts of the highly contaminated Red Forest, which attracted considerable media attention due to unconfirmed reports that soldiers were being treated for radiation sickness in Belarus. The IAEA later clarified that only modest radiation doses (6.5 mSv/year) could have resulted from such activities, and a tour guide in the Zone later acknowledged to the Washington Post that he had helped start these rumors in a "huge exaggeration."

On 14 February 2025, Ukrainian president Volodymyr Zelenskyy said that a Russian drone attack significantly damaged the Chernobyl New Safe Confinement, which covers the sarcophagus and Unit No. 4. The IAEA said that radiation levels at the site remained normal.

On 29 April 2026, Ukraine's Energy Minister Denys Shmyhal announced that the United States would provide $100 million towards repairs of the damaged containment dome, with the total estimated cost of repairs at €500 million ($585 million).

== Decommissioning ==
After the explosion at reactor No. 4 and construction of the sarcophagus, the remaining three reactors were de-contaminated and re-launched (reactor No. 1 on 1 October 1986, reactor No. 2 on 5 November 1986, and reactor No. 3 on 4 December 1987). Reactor No. 3 was the latest to be restarted, as a thick reinforced concrete partition wall was built to physically isolate it from the remains of reactor No. 4, alongside rerouting shared piping and systems. Afterwards, they continued to operate until the post-Soviet period. The Chernobyl New Safe Confinement is equipped with two overhead main cranes, which will be used to remove unstable parts of the original sarcophagus. The majority of the external gamma radiation emissions at the site are from the isotope caesium-137, which has a half-life of 30.17 years. As of 2016, the radiation exposure from that radionuclide has declined by half since the 1986 accident.

On 11 October 1991, reactor No. 2's turbine caught fire, and was subsequently shut down. Ukraine's 1991 independence from the Soviet Union generated further discussion on the Chernobyl topic, because the Verkhovna Rada, Ukraine's new parliament, was composed largely of young reformers. Discussions about the future of nuclear energy in Ukraine ultimately moved the government toward a decision to decommission reactor No. 2.

On 30 November 1996, following pressure from foreign governments, reactor No. 1 was shut down. Dismantling and removal of equipment began at reactor No. 1 in 2007. The work is expected to be completed by 2028.

On 15 December 2000, reactor No. 3 was shut down after operating briefly since March 1999 following almost three months of repairs, and the plant as a whole ceased producing electricity. In April 2015, units 1 through 3 entered the decommissioning phase. Upon being shut down, the plant was re-classified as a 'State Special Enterprise', while 'V. I. Lenin' was removed from the name following Ukraine's independence.

In 2013, the pump lifting river water into the cooling reservoir adjacent to the facility was powered down, with the thermal sink expected to evaporate slowly.

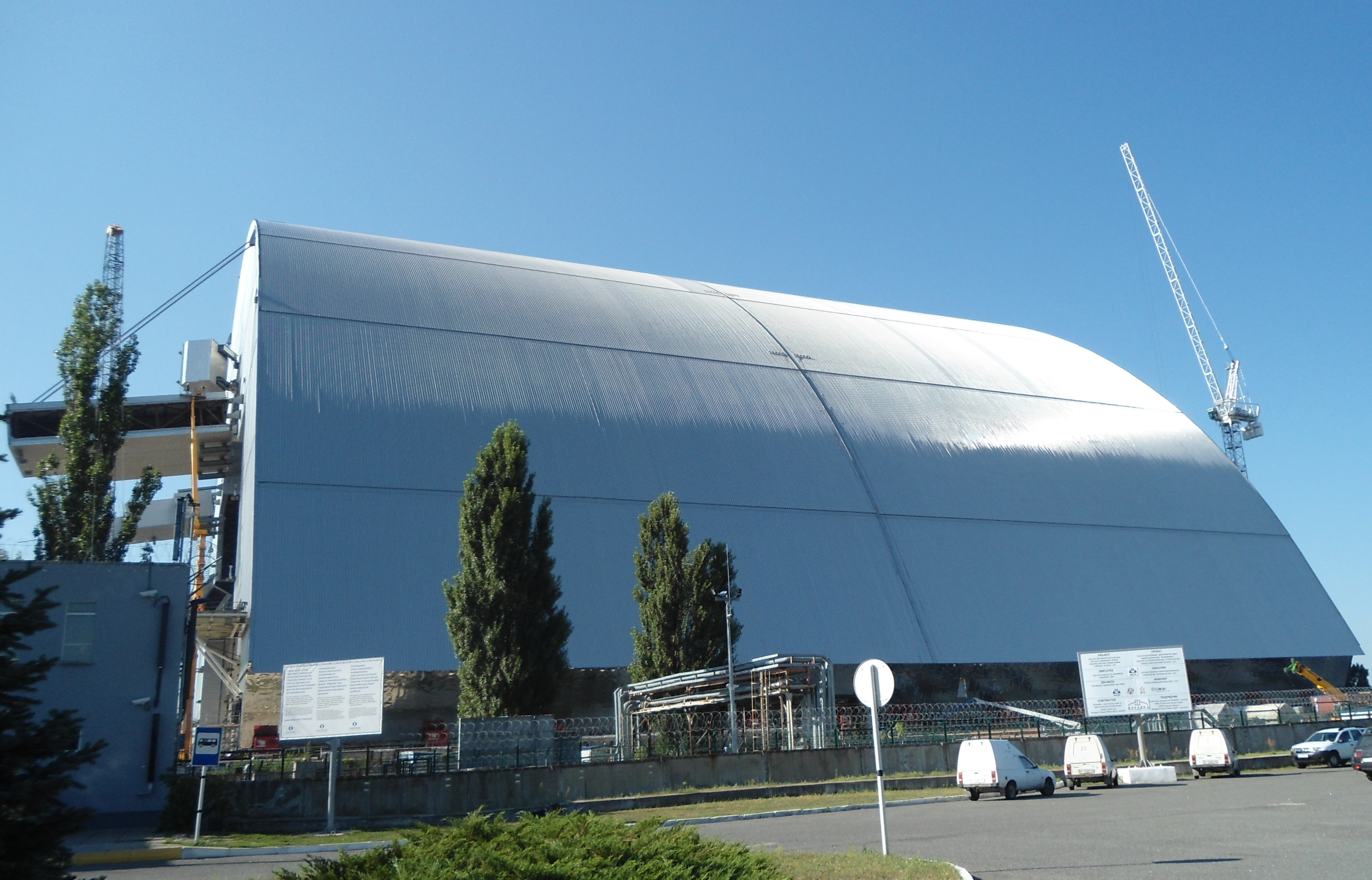
New Safe Confinement in 2016

Originally announced in June 2003, a new steel containment structure named the New Safe Confinement was built to replace the aging and hastily built sarcophagus that protected ruined reactor No. 4. Though the project's development had been delayed several times, construction officially began in September 2010. The New Safe Confinement was financed by an international fund managed by the European Bank for Reconstruction and Development and was designed and built by the French-led consortium Novarka.

In February 2013, a 600 square metres (6,458 sq ft) portion of the roof and wall adjacent to the covered part of the turbine hall collapsed into the entombed area of the turbine hall. The collapse did not affect any other part of the Object Shelter (sarcophagus) or the New Safe Confinement. No variances in radiation levels as a result of the incident were detected. The collapsed roof was built after the Chernobyl disaster and was later repaired.

Novarka built a large arch-shaped structure out of steel 270 metres (886 ft) wide, 100 metres (328 ft) high, and 150 metres (492 ft) long to cover the old crumbling concrete dome that was in use at the time. The structure was built in two segments which were joined in August 2015. In November 2016, the completed arch was placed over the existing sarcophagus. This steel casing project was expected to cost $1.4 billion, and was completed in 2017. The casing also meets the definition of a nuclear entombment device.

Separately, an American firm Holtec International built a storage facility within the exclusion zone for nuclear waste produced by Chernobyl. This facility, named the Interim Storage Facility 2, has dry storage for the 21,297 spent fuel assemblies formerly at the power plant, which are being loaded into approximately 231 waste canisters, and stored in the ISF-2 for 100 years. In 2020, the storage facility was completed, and on November 18, 2020, the first canister of nuclear waste was loaded into the storage area. By January 2022, 1,698 spent fuel assemblies had been moved in.

== See also ==
- Outline of the Chernobyl disaster
- List of inactive or decommissioned civil nuclear reactors
