= Jacques Van Gompel =

Belgian politician (1947–2026)

- Born: 12 June 1947; Gilly, Belgium
- Died: 21 August 2026 (aged 79)
- Occupation: politician

Jacques Van Gompel (12 June 1947 – 21 August 2026) was a Belgian politician for the Socialist Party (PS).

== Political career ==
- 1970–1976 Councilman in Gilly, (merged with Charleroi in 1976)
- 1979–1983 Councilman in Charleroi
- 1983–1988 Alderman (Youth & Public Works) in Charleroi
- 1989–1995 First Alderman in Charleroi
- 1995–2000 Acting mayor of Charleroi
- 1995–2006 Mayor of Charleroi

In 1978 Van Gompel was elected as a representative for the Charleroi area in the Belgian Parliament. He resigned in 1983, in order to devote all his time to the administration of Charleroi.

== Scandal ==
On 24 May 2006, Van Gompel offered his resignation as mayor after the mayor's office was accused of fraud, forgery, and corruption related to public solicitations. The PS, however, put its trust in Van Gompel, and he would stay on.

On 20 October 2006, Van Gompel was arrested himself, and charged with fraud and forgery. He resigned from his mayor position from jail, on 23 October 2006.

In October 2011 he was condemned to 18 months imprisonment (provisionally). However, in March 2013 the Court of Appeal granted him a complete acquittal. However, his political career was over, after he had not been a candidate for the communal elections of October 2012.

== Death ==
Van Gompel died on 21 August 2026, at the age of 79.

== Literature ==
- Olivier COLLOT, Jacques Van Gompel. Un homme, une vie, une ville, Brussels, ed. Pire, 2006.
- Jacques Van Gompel, in: Encyclopédie du Mouvement wallon, Parlementaires et ministres de la Wallonie (1974–2009), T. IV, Namen, Institut Destrée, 2010

== See also ==
- ICDI affair
