= UNIOP–INUSOP affair =

The UNIOP–INUSOP affair was a Belgian political scandal of the early 1990s, in which it was alleged that government ministers from the Socialist Party overpaid for political studies in the late 1980s.

The affair is named after the polling institute UNIOP (Universitair Instituut voor Opiniepeilingen) - INUSOP (Institut Universitaire de Sondage d'Opinion), which was closely related to the Vrije Universiteit Brussel and Université Libre de Bruxelles.

Among those whom prosecutors sought to charge in 1994 were foreign minister Willy Claes, former Brussels region Premier Philippe Moureaux and former defense minister Guy Coëme. A parliamentary panel judged, however, that sufficient evidence was available to charge only Coëme. He was convicted in 1996 in a Supreme Court trial, but a later decision by the European Court of Human Rights judged his trial to be unfair.
