= Kursk Nuclear Power Plant =

Russian nuclear power plant

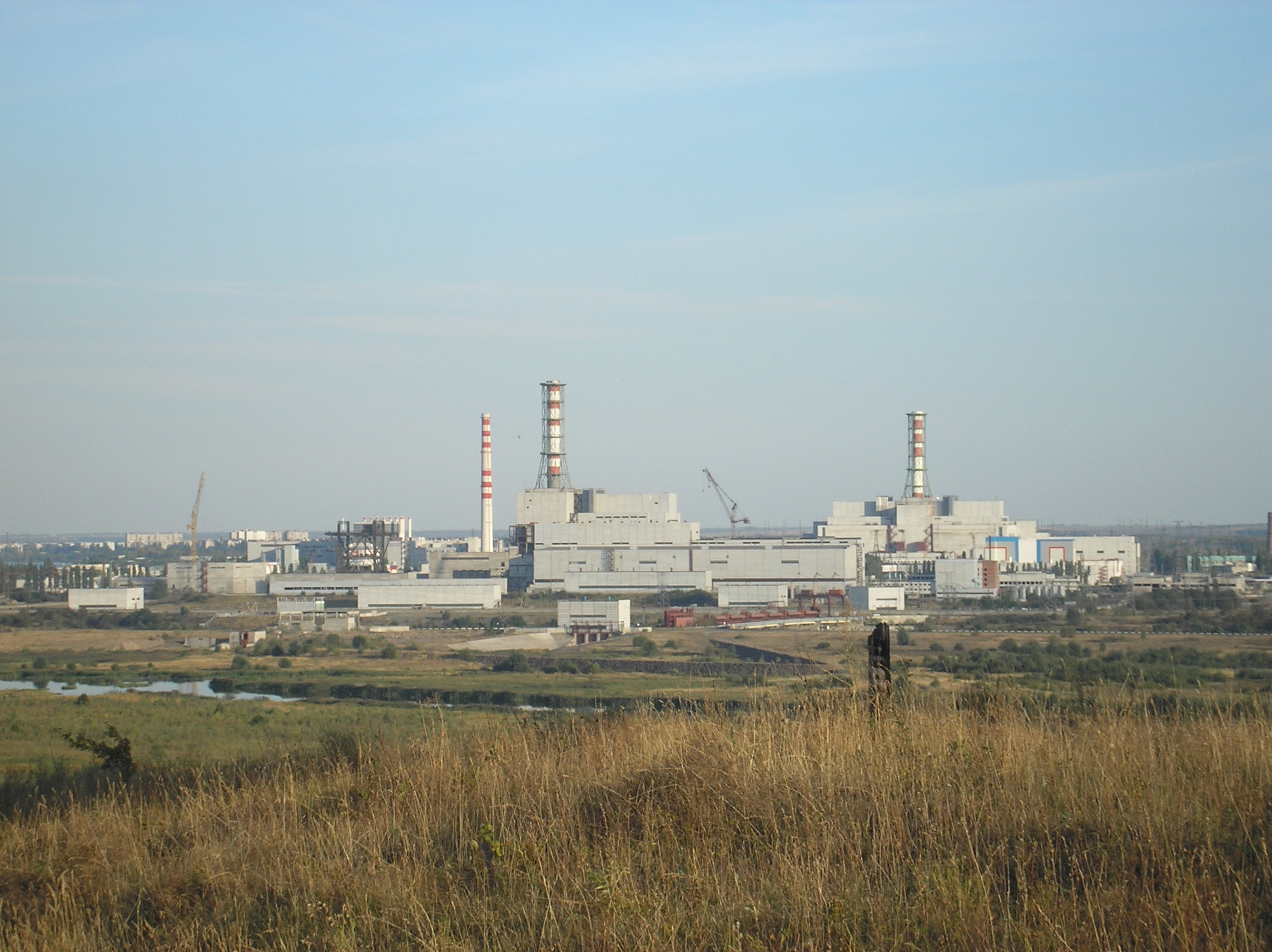
- Kursk I RBMK with the incomplete blocks 5 and 6 in the foreground in 2010
- Official name: Курская АЭС
- Country: Russia
- Coordinates: 51°40′35″N 35°36′23″E
- Status: Operational
- Construction began: 1 June 1972
- Commission date: 12 October 1977
- Decommission date: Unit 1 in 2021 and unit 2 in 2024
- Owner: Rosatom
- Operator: Rosenergoatom

Nuclear power station
- Reactor type: RBMK-1000

Power generation
- Units operational: 2 × 1,000 MW
- Units decommissioned: 2 × 1,000 MW
- Nameplate capacity: 2,000 MW
- Capacity factor: 74% according to PRIS

External links
- Website: Kursk NPP
- Commons: Related media on Commons

The Kursk Nuclear Power Plant (Note: Russian: Курская АЭС, romanized: Kurskaya AES) (Kurskaya atomnaya electrostansaya in Russian) is one of the three biggest nuclear power plants (NPPs) in Russia and one of the four biggest electricity producers in the country. It is located on the bank of the Seym River about 40 kilometers west of the city of Kursk, midway between it and the town of Lgov, in western Russia. The nearby city of Kurchatov was founded when construction of the plant began. The plant feeds the grid for Kursk Oblast and 19 other regions. As of 2025, the site houses two active reactors and two decommissioned older units. It also houses the partially built Kursk 5 and Kursk 6 units which had construction halted, and two new VVER-TOI designs (Kursk II-1 and Kursk II-2) are under construction.

The International Atomic Energy Agency's Director General Rafael Grossi urged both Russia and Ukraine to exercise "maximum restraint" to avoid an accident at the plant during the August 2024 Kursk Oblast incursion following reports of "significant military activity" near the facility.

== Kursk I RBMK ==
=== Planning and construction ===
The decision to build the Kursk NPP was made in the mid-1960s by Soviet authorities. The plant was intended to supply the growing energy demands of the quickly developing industrial complex of the Kursk Magnetic Anomaly (Stary-Oskol and Mikhaylovsk ore mining and processing factories and other manufacturing companies). The general designer of Kursk I was Atomenergoproject (Moscow), the general contractor was the Research and Development Institute of Power Engineering (Moscow) and the research manager was the Kurchatov Institute. It was built by the Department for the Construction of Kursk NPP (now Kurskatomenergostroy Ltd). On-site construction began in 1971.

The structure of the Kursk I plant is almost identical to Chernobyl's structure having two first-generation RBMK blocks followed by two second-generation blocks. The 1991 American television movie Chernobyl: The Final Warning used the Kursk plant and the neighbouring town of Kurchatov to stand in for the Chernobyl Nuclear Power Plant and Pripyat respectively. The Kursk I plant and Kurchatov would again stand in as the Chernobyl nuclear power plant and Pripyat in the 2021 Russian film Chernobyl: Abyss.

=== Specifications ===
As the power plant has the RBMK type reactors, Kursk I is a one-circuit plant the steam supplied to the turbines is produced inside the reactor by the boiling coolant (ordinary demineralized water circulating inside a circuit). To condense the steam the plant uses water from a 21.5 sq km cooling pond. It has four RBMK-1000 reactors (1000 MW each). The first unit was launched in 1976, the second in 1979, the third in 1983 and the fourth in 1985. Kursk NPP is one of the three biggest NPPs in Russia and one of the four biggest electricity producers in the country (along with Balakovo and Leningrad NPPs and Sayano-Shushink WPP).

Kursk NPP is an important part of the Unified Power System of Russia. Its key consumer is the ECO Center energy system covering 19 regions of the Central Federal District. Kursk NPP produces 52% of the total output of all electric power plants of Chernozemye (Black Earth Belt). It is the key energy supplier of Central Chernozemye, a region that produces 48% of iron ore, 13.5% of steel, 19% of ferrous metals, 9.6% of meat, 19.5% of sugar in Russia. The development of that region is largely credited to the Kursk NPP as it provides power and a stable source of both employment and income for the communities around it. Kursk NPP feeds 90% of the industry of the Kursk region. It also supplies electricity to northern and north-eastern Ukraine.

As of the beginning of 2006, the plant had generated 560 billion kWh. In total Kursk's four RBMK-1000 units have generated 987 billion kWh of electricity while simultaneously providing district heating to nearby towns and process heat to industry.

=== Shutdown ===
Although the Kursk I plant has been a major success for the local area, as the reactors age they begin to require much longer and more costly maintenance outages compared to modern reactor types with greater efficiency. In 2015, Rosenergoatom proposed that Unit 1 RBMK would be shut down in 2023, followed by Unit 2 in 2027. On 19 December 2021, exactly 45 years to the day since it began operation, Unit 1 RBMK shut down. Unit 2 shut down in January 2024. The third and fourth units were scheduled to close in 2029 and 2031, but now they are due to close in 2033 and 2035 respectively.

== Kursk II VVER ==
Kursk II Nuclear Power Plant
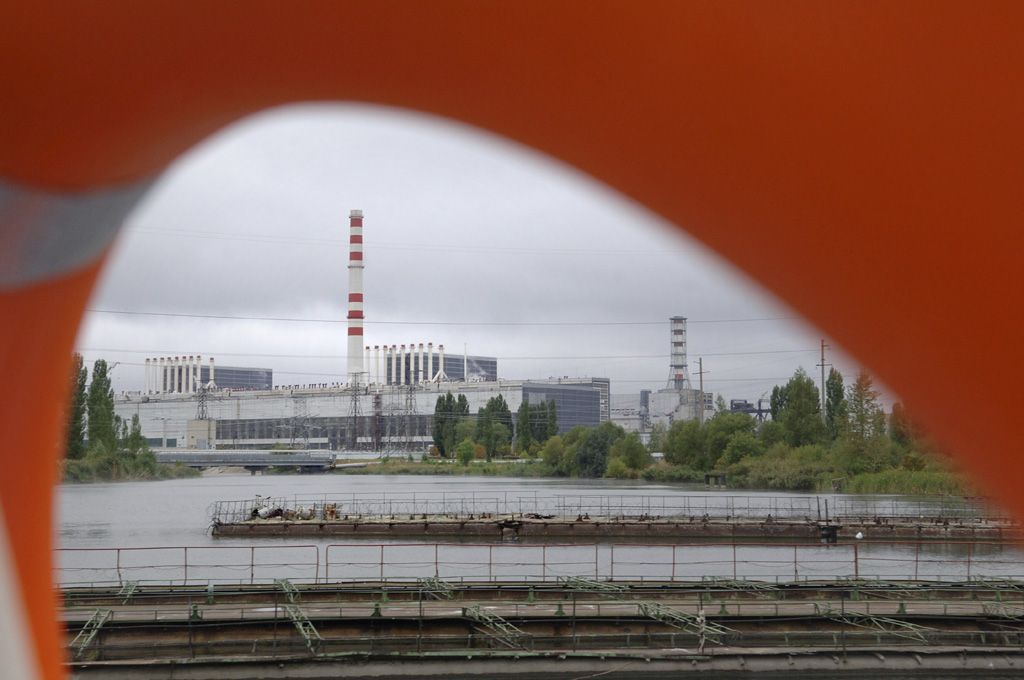
- Power plant blocks 1 and 2
- Official name: Курская АЭС
- Country: Russia
- Coordinates: 51°41′18″N 35°34′24″E
- Status: Under construction
- Construction began: 29 April 2018
- Commission date: (2025)
- Owner: Rosatom
- Operator: Rosenergoatom

Nuclear power station
- Reactor type: VVER-1300/TOI

Power generation
- Units operational: 1 × 1,300 MW
- Units under const.: 2 × 1,300 MW
- Nameplate capacity: 1,300 MW

External links
- Website: Kursk NPP
- Commons: Related media on Commons

=== Planning and construction ===
With the RBMK reactors of Kursk I reaching end-of-life, and because of how heavily the surrounding area relies on this site, a replacement was necessary. The new VVER-TOI reactor was chosen, and this site would be the pioneering power station with this reactor type.

Civil construction of Kursk II began in 2017 with the excavation of an estimated 1.2 million cubic meters of soil, as part of the work for the two new units. More than 800,000m³ of sand and gravel mixture was laid at the base of the buildings and structures. The formation of the sand and gravel coating of unit one was completed in October 2017, while the first concrete layer (concrete bedding) under the foundation plate was assembled in November 2017. The first 16t reinforced concrete block was installed on the rebar of the lower foundation belt in December 2017. The foundation will comprise 105 reinforced concrete blocks with a total weight of 1,600t. More than 16,000m³ of self-compacting concrete mix was proposed to be laid in the foundation slab of the reactor building, and the works were expected to be completed by June 2018. The construction work also included the engineering networks – steam pipelines, hot water supply pipelines for the construction base, and heating networks.

Five 40t GIRAFFE TDK-40.1100 pillar cranes will be used for constructing the internal and boundary walls of the reactor unit of the first power unit. DEMAG CC 6800, a heavy-duty crane, will also be used for constructing the building structures at the reactor buildings.

The first concrete was poured in April 2018, marking the start of construction of the nuclear island building foundations. The first VVER-TOI reactors Kursk-II-1 and II-2 were to replace Kursk 1 and 2 RBMK, which were approaching end-of-life. With two more VVER-TOI units planned, they will eventually replace all four RBMK reactors. The first Kursk RBMK reactor shut down in December 2021, while the first Kursk II unit was expected to be commissioned by the end of 2022, and the second unit in 2023.

In January 2023, the 235-tonne steel dome was set on the unit 1 containment building, where it will serve as a key barrier between the reactor and the environment. This lift raised the overall height of the reactor building to its final height of 64.5 meters (211 feet). The steel dome will be covered in a thick layer of reinforced concrete forming the containment building.

In March 2025 licenses for construction of the 3rd and 4th units of Kursk-II were issued.

In March 2026 the first unit of Kursk-II has reached 100% power capacity for the first time.

=== Specifications ===
The two 3+ generation reactors of Kursk NPP II will be the pilot units of the VVER-TOI project and include a turbine plant featuring a low-speed turbine-generator, manufactured by Power Machines PJSC. The new design will increase the reactor capacity by an additional 25% over conventional VVER-1000 reactors. A PS330/10kV substation will provide electric energy for the construction works and for the site’s facilities. The new substation will be connected from a 330kV operating outdoor switchgear to a 330kV overhead power line.

== Reactor data ==
Kursk I consists of six RBMK design reactors, four of which were completed, and two of which remain in operation. Kursk II is under construction and will contain VVER design reactors.

Unit	Reactor type	Net capacity	Gross capacity	Construction started	Electricity grid	Commercial operation	Shutdown
Kursk 1	RBMK-1000	925 MW	1,000 MW	1972-06-01	1976-12-19	1977-10-12	Shutdown 2021-12-19
Kursk 2	RBMK-1000	925 MW	1,000 MW	1973-01-01	1979-01-28	1979-08-17	Shutdown 2024-01-31
Kursk 3	RBMK-1000	925 MW	1,000 MW	1978-04-01	1983-10-17	1984-03-30	(2033, planned)
Kursk 4	RBMK-1000	925 MW	1,000 MW	1981-05-01	1985-12-02	1986-02-05	(2035, planned)
Kursk 5 (Incomplete)	RBMK-1000	925 MW	1,000 MW	1985-12-01	–	1992 (planned)	Construction cancelled 2012-08-15
Kursk 6 (Incomplete)	RBMK-1000	925 MW	1,000 MW	1986-08-01	–	–	Construction cancelled 1993-12-01
Kursk II-1	VVER-1300/510	1,115 MW	1,255 MW	2018-04-29	2025-12-31	2026-05-01	(2126 est.)
Kursk II-2	VVER-1300/510	1,115 MW	1,255 MW	2019-04-15	–	–	–
Kursk II-3	VVER-1300/510	1,115 MW	1,300 MW	2026-01-31	–	–	–
Kursk II-4	VVER-1300/510	1,115 MW	1,300 MW	license issued	–	–	–

== Russo-Ukrainian War ==
The International Atomic Energy Agency's Director General Rafael Grossi urged both Russia and Ukraine to exercise "maximum restraint" to avoid an accident at the plant during the August 2024 Kursk Oblast incursion following reports of "significant military activity" near the facility. On 11 August 2024, it was reported that Russia had been constructing defensive trench lines near the power plant and up to 8 km away, with additional National Guard of Russia (Rosgvardiya) forces. Fighting occurred 20 miles (35 km) from the plant.

The Power Plant was impacted by a drone strike allegedly carried out by Ukrainian forces on August 24, 2025, coinciding with Ukraine's Independence Day. The attack caused a fire that was quickly extinguished and damaged an auxiliary transformer, leading to a 50% reduction in the operating capacity of one reactor. No injuries were reported, and radiation levels remained within normal limits according to the International Atomic Energy Agency. The incident heightened concerns about nuclear safety amid ongoing hostilities between Russia and Ukraine.

== See also ==
- Nuclear power in Russia
- List of commercial nuclear reactors#Russia
