= Leningrad Nuclear Power Plant =

Nuclear power plant in Sosnovy Bor, Leningrad Oblast, Russia

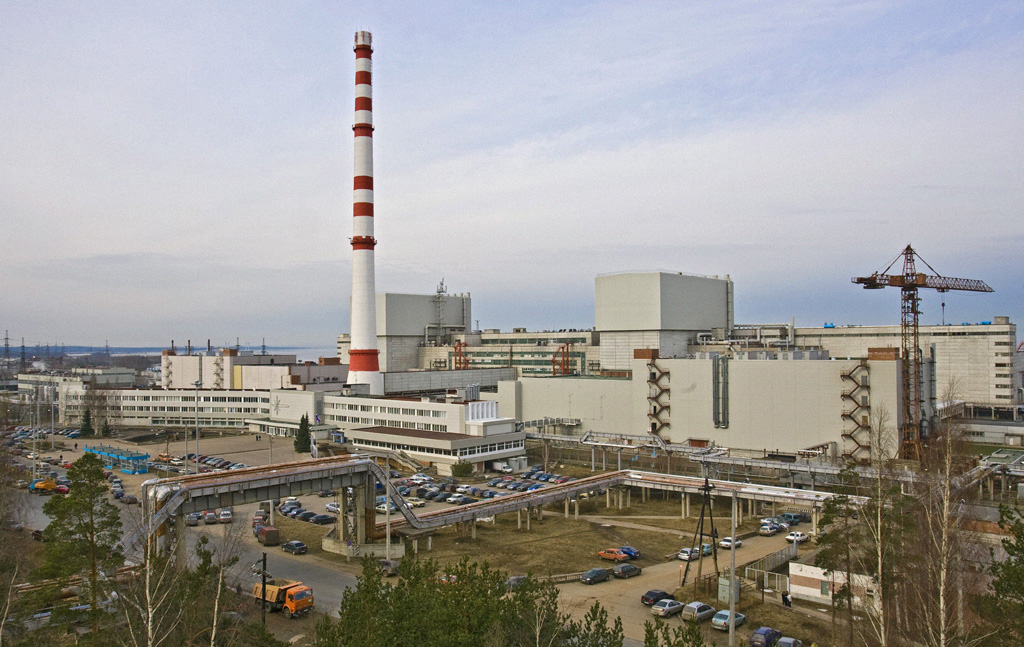
- Site of the Leningrad I RBMK Nuclear Power Plant
- Country: Russia
- Location: Sosnovy Bor, Leningrad Oblast
- Coordinates: 59°51′09″N 29°02′55″E
- Status: Operational
- Construction began: 1 March 1970
- Commission date: 1 November 1974
- Decommission date: 21 December 2018 (Unit 1) 10 November 2020 (Unit 2)
- Owner: Rosenergoatom
- Operator: Rosenergoatom

Nuclear power station
- Reactors: 8
- Reactor type: RBMK-1000, VVER-1200
- Reactor supplier: Atomstroyexport

Power generation
- Units operational: 2 × 925 MW, 2 × 1085 MW
- Units under const.: 2 × 1085 MW
- Units decommissioned: 2 × 925 MW
- Nameplate capacity: 4050 MW
- Capacity factor: 60.5%
- Annual net output: 21,208 GW·h

External links
- Website: rosenergoatom.ru/stations_projects/sayt-leningradskoy-aes/index.php?sphrase_id=31674
- Commons: Related media on Commons

Leningrad Nuclear Power Plant (Russian: Ленинградская атомная электростанция; Ленинградская АЭС Leningradskaya atomnaya elektrostantsiya; Leningradskaya AES is a nuclear power plant located in the town of Sosnovy Bor in Russia's Leningrad Oblast, on the southern shore of the Gulf of Finland, some 70 kilometres (43 mi) to the west of the city centre of Saint Petersburg.

The Leningrad NPP was the first power station in the Soviet Union to operate the RBMK type of reactor. Despite its age, in 2012 and 2013 the Leningrad NPP took the third place in the annual contest for the Best Nuclear Power Plants of the Year. The plant has four nuclear reactors of the RBMK-1000 type, Units 1 and 2 of which are first generation units similar to that of Kursk and Chernobyl units 1 and 2, while the units 3 and 4 are second generation similar to Chernobyl 3 and 4. Each unit has a separate reactor building but the turbine hall is shared between 2 reactors. In 2008, construction started on Leningrad II with 2 VVER-1200 type reactors. They will eventually replace the RBMK units as they are shut down due to age.

== Reactor data ==
From May 2012 to December 2013, Unit 1 was offline while repairs were made related to some deformed graphite moderator blocks.

On 21 December 2018, the first unit of Leningrad NPP was shut down for decommissioning. Defuelling at unit 1 was completed in August 2021.

On 10 November 2020, the second unit of Leningrad NPP was shut down for decommissioning. Defuelling at unit 2 was completed in December 2024.

Leningrad units 3 and 4 remain operational, the 3rd unit got life extension until 2030.

In 2026, permission was granted to operate Leningrad unit 4 until 2031, under a life extension programme.

Unit	Reactor type	Net capacity (MW)	Gross capacity (MW)	Construction started	Grid connection	Commercial operation	Shutdown	Defueled
Leningrad - 1	RBMK-1000	925	1000	1970-03-01	1973-12-21	1974-11-01	2018-12-21	(2023)
Leningrad - 2	RBMK-1000	925	1000	1970-06-01	1975-07-11	1976-02-11	2020-11-10	(2025)
Leningrad - 3	RBMK-1000	925	1000	1973-12-01	1979-12-07	1980-06-29	(2030 est)	–
Leningrad - 4	RBMK-1000	925	1000	1975-02-01	1981-02-09	1981-08-29	(2031 est)	–
Leningrad II - 1	VVER-1200/491 (AES-2006)	1085	1187	2008-10-25	2018-03-09	2018-10-29	(2078)	
Leningrad II - 2	VVER-1200/491 (AES-2006)	1085	1199	2010-04-15	2020-10-26	2021-03-22	(2080)	
Leningrad II - 3	VVER-1200/491 (AES-2006)	1085	1199	2024-03-14	?	?	?	
Leningrad II - 4	VVER-1200/491 (AES-2006)	1085	1199	2025-03-20	?	?	?	

== Incidents and accidents ==
The first accident at the plant occurred shortly after the first unit came online. On 7 January 1975, a concrete tank containing radioactive gases from Unit 1 exploded; there were no reported accident victims or radiation releases.

Less than a month later, on 6 February 1975, the secondary cooling circuit of Unit 1 ruptured, releasing contaminated water into the environment. Three people were killed, and the accident was not reported in the media.

On 28 November 1975, a fuel channel in Unit 1 suffered a loss of coolant, resulting in the degradation (partial meltdown) of a nuclear fuel assembly that led to a significant release of radiation lasting for one month. The exposed inhabitants of the Baltic region were not notified of the danger. The accident was not reported in the media. The Ministry of Medium Machine Building blamed the accident on poor construction, rather than on the inherent instability of the reactor design, in an attempt to cover up the accident. The commission investigating the incident made several recommendations to improve safety of RBMK reactors, but they were not implemented. Practically the same accident occurred in Unit 1 of the Chernobyl Power Station in 1982.

In July 1976 and again in September 1979, due to a poor safety culture, a fire broke out in a concrete vault containing radioactive waste. Water used in extinguishing the fires was contaminated, leaked into the environment, and entered the water table. This was not reported in the media.

On 28 December 1990, during refurbishment of Unit 1, it was noticed that the space between the fuel channels and the graphite stack (contaminated during the 1975 accident) had widened. The contaminated graphite was spilled, and the radiation levels in the space under the reactor increased. Radiation was detected 6 km away from the unit, but this was not reported in the media.

On 3 December 1991, due to faulty equipment and a lack of safety rule compliance, 10 new fuel rods were dropped and damaged. The staff tried to conceal the accident from the plant's management.

In March 1992, an accident at the plant leaked radioactive gases and iodine into the air through a ruptured fuel channel. This was the first accident at the station that was announced in the media.

On 27 August 2009, the third unit was stopped when a hole was found in the discharge header of a pump. According to the automated radiation control system, the radiation situation at the plant and in its 30-kilometre (19 mi) monitoring zone was normal. The plant's management refuted rumors of an accident and stated that the third unit was stopped for a "short-term unscheduled maintenance", with a restart scheduled for 31 August 2009.

On 19 December 2015, unit 2 was stopped (scrammed) due to a broken steam pipe. No radioactively contaminated material was released.

== Electricity generation ==
Production of Leningrad Units 1–4, 1974-2017 (TWh/year)

== Leningrad II Nuclear Power Plant ==
Leningrad II Nuclear Power Plant
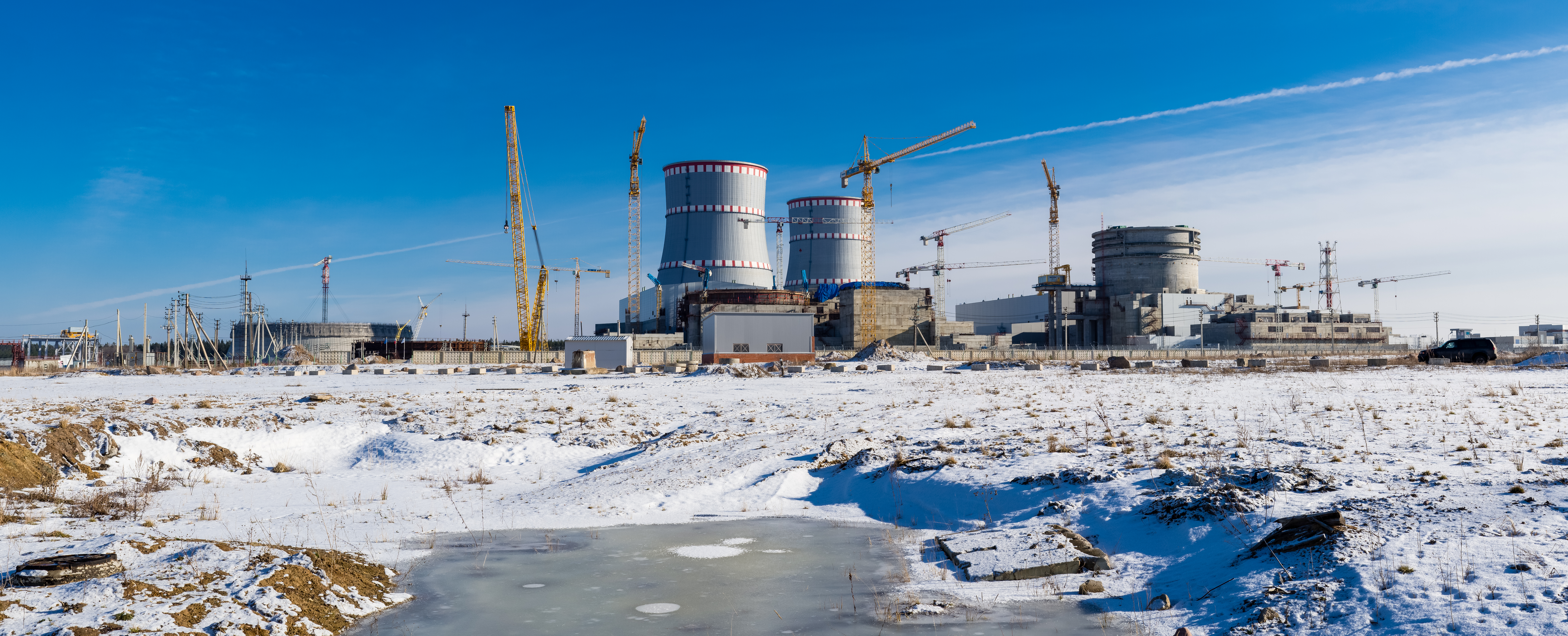
- Leningrad II under construction
- Country: Russia
- Location: Sosnovy Bor, Leningrad Oblast
- Coordinates: 59°49′52″N 29°03′35″E
- Status: Operational
- Construction began: 25 October 2008
- Commission date: 22 March 2021
- Owner: Rosenergoatom
- Operator: Rosenergoatom

Nuclear power station
- Reactors: 2 (2 in construction)
- Reactor type: VVER-1200/V491 (AES-2006)
- Reactor supplier: Atomstroyexport

Power generation
- Units operational: 2 × 1085 MW
- Units under const.: 2 × 1085 MW
- Nameplate capacity: 2170 MW

External links
- Website: rosenergoatom.ru/stations_projects/sayt-leningradskoy-aes/index.php?sphrase_id=31674
- Commons: Related media on Commons

In December 2019, Leningrad II-1 was integrated into the district heating system of Sosnovy Bor and the local industrial park, replacing the heating capacity of the closed RBMK-1000 units. The thermal output is 3200 MW.

On 25 October 2008, Saint Petersburg Atomenergoproekt began concreting the foundation plate of the reactor building of the Leningrad Nuclear Power Plant II, Unit 1. The cost of the project was estimated at almost 70 billion Russian rubles (about $3 billion US dollars at the time). A construction licence was issued on 22 July 2009.

== Gallery ==
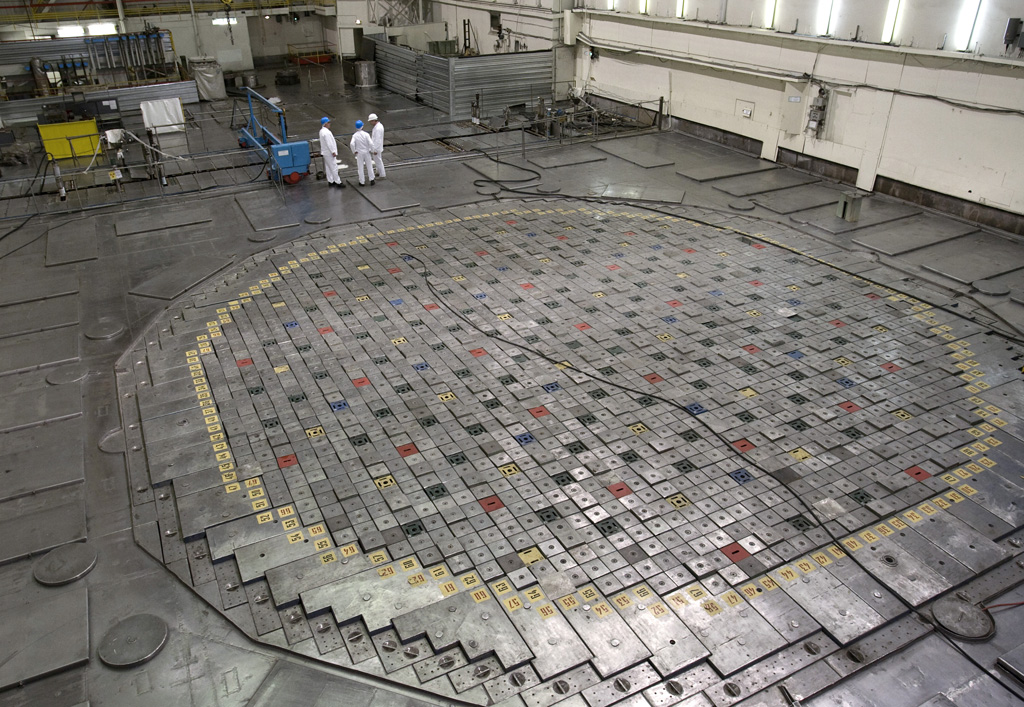
Reactor hall of one of the RBMK units

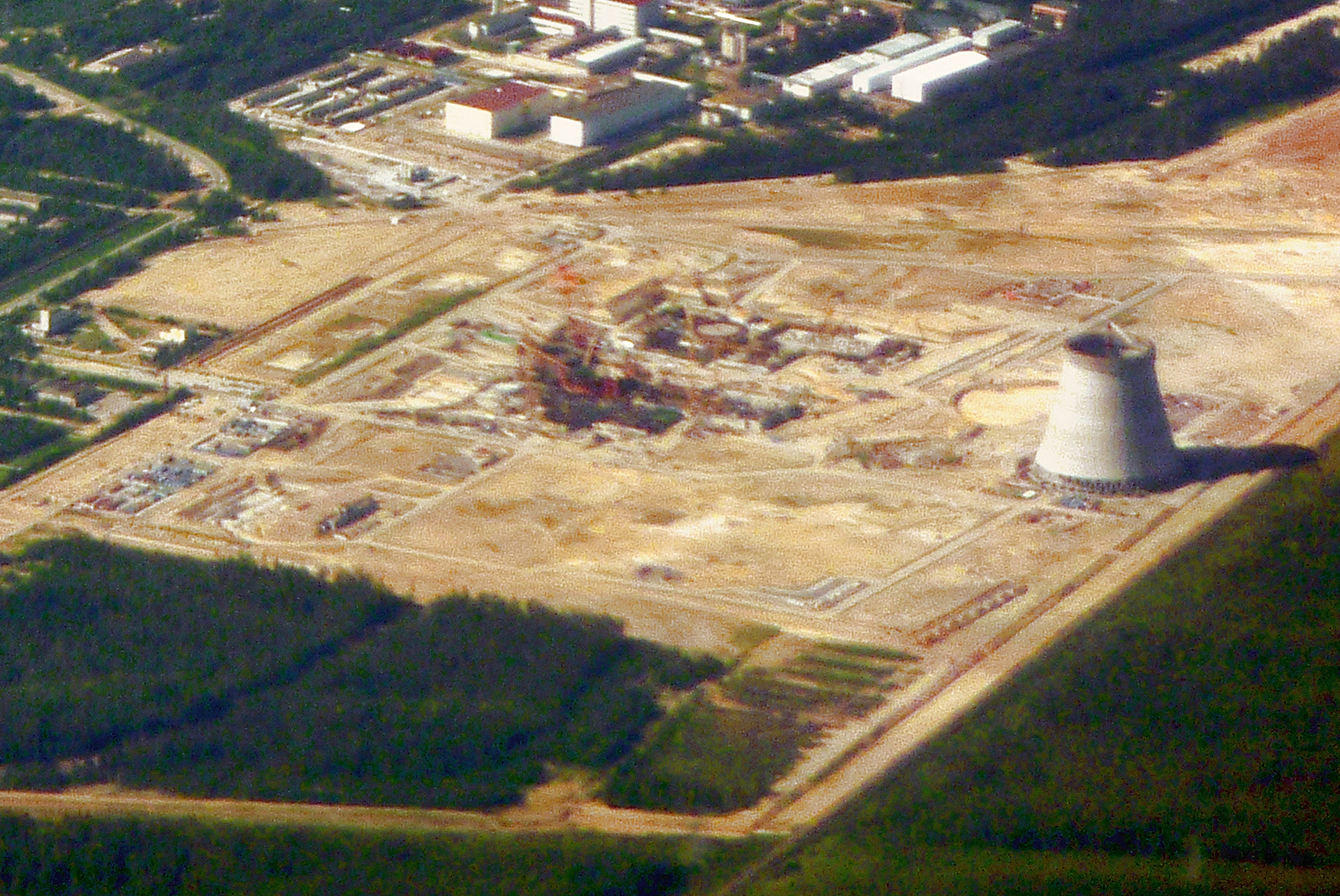
Construction site for Leningrad Nuclear Power Plant II, April 2010

== See also ==
- Nuclear power in Russia
