= Trinitite =

Glassy mineral left in the dirt after the plutonium-based Trinity bomb test

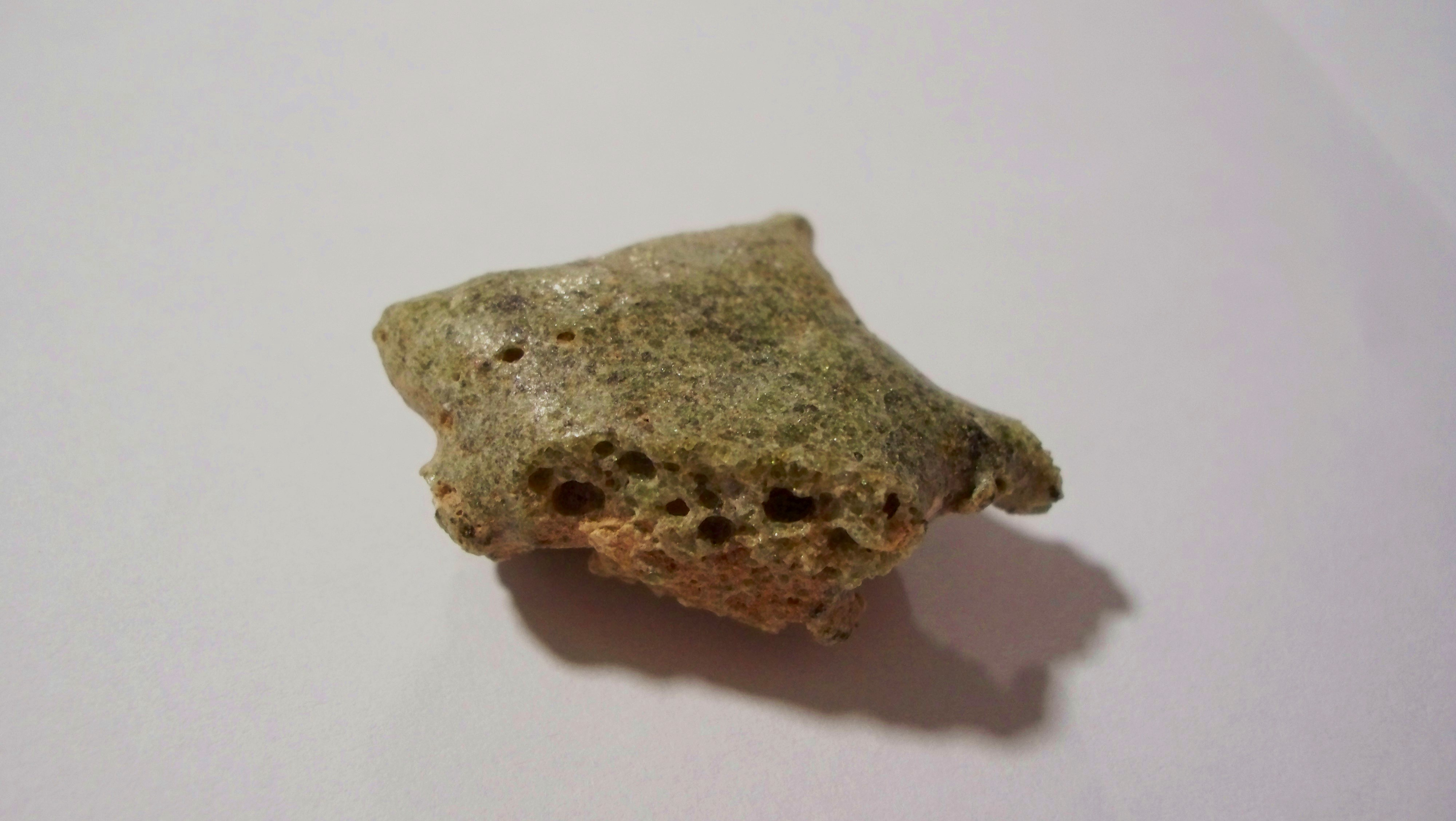
Trinitite

Trinitite, also known as atomsite or Alamogordo glass, is the glassy residue left on the desert floor after the plutonium-based Trinity nuclear bomb test on July 16, 1945, near Alamogordo, New Mexico. The glass is primarily made of arkosic sand composed of quartz grains and feldspar (both microcline and smaller amount of plagioclase with small amount of calcite, hornblende, and augite in a matrix of sandy clay) that was melted by the atomic blast. It was first academically described in American Mineralogist in 1948.

It is usually light green, although red trinitite was also found in one section of the blast site, and rare black trinitite was also formed. It is mildly radioactive but safe to handle. Pieces of the material remain at the Trinity site as of 2018, although most of it was bulldozed and buried by the United States Atomic Energy Commission in 1953.

== Formation ==
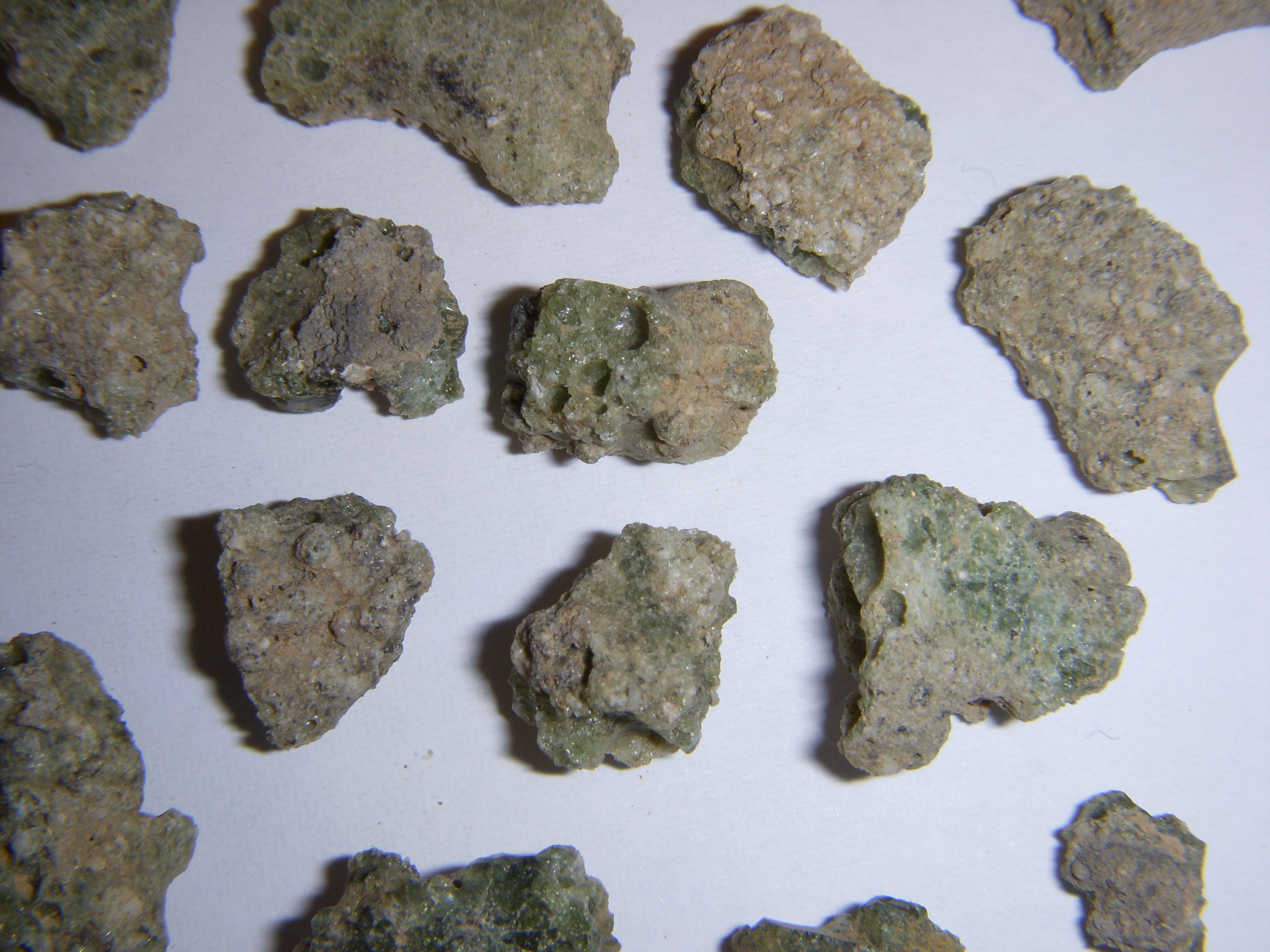
Pieces of trinitite

In 2005, it was theorized by Los Alamos National Laboratory scientist Robert E. Hermes and independent investigator William Strickfaden that much of the glass was formed by sand that was drawn up inside the fireball and then rained down in a liquid form. In a 2010 article in Geology Today, Nelson Eby of University of Massachusetts Lowell and Robert Hermes describe trinitite:

Contained within the glass are melted bits of the first atomic bomb and the support structures and various radionuclides formed during the detonation. The glass itself is marvellously complex at the tens to hundreds of micrometre scale, and besides glasses of varying composition, also contains unmelted quartz grains. Air transport of the melted material led to the formation of spheres and dumbbell-shaped glass particles. Similar glasses are formed during all ground-level nuclear detonations and contain forensic information that can be used to identify the atomic device.

This was supported by a 2011 study based on nuclear imaging and spectrometric techniques. Dark green, grey, and black trinitite is theorised by researchers to contain varying concentrations of material from the bomb's steel support structure, while red trinitite contains material originating from copper electrical wiring.

An estimated 4,300 gigajoules (4.3×10^{19} erg) of heat energy went into forming the glass. As the temperature required to melt the sand into the observed glass form was about 1,470 °C (2,680 °F), this was estimated to have been the minimum temperature the sand was exposed to. Material within the blast fireball was superheated for an estimated 2–3 seconds before solidification. Relatively volatile elements such as zinc are found in decreasing quantities the closer the trinitite was formed to the centre of the blast. The higher the temperature, the more these volatile elements evaporated and were not captured as the material solidified.

The detonation left large quantities of trinitite scattered around the crater, with Time writing in September 1945 that the site took the appearance of "[a] lake of green jade," while "[t]he glass takes strange shapes—lopsided marbles, knobbly sheets a quarter-inch thick, broken, thin-walled bubbles, green, wormlike forms." The presence of rounded, beadlike forms suggests that some material melted after being thrown into the air and landed already formed, rather than remaining at ground level and being melted there. Other trinitite, which formed on the ground, contains inclusions of infused sand. This trinitite cooled rapidly on its upper surface, while the lower surface was superheated.

== Composition ==
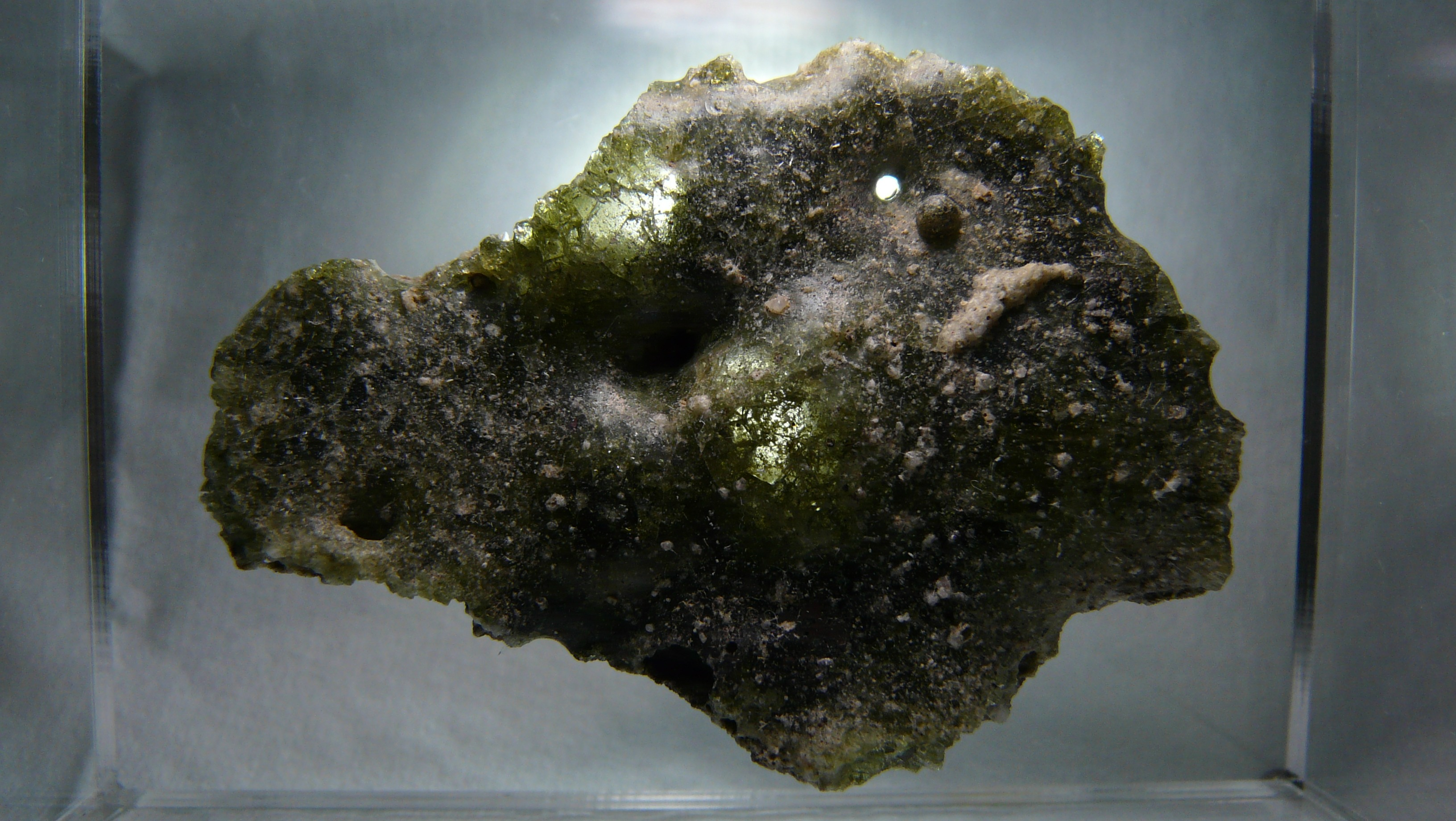
A near-hollow sample of trinitite backlit to show light passing through the material

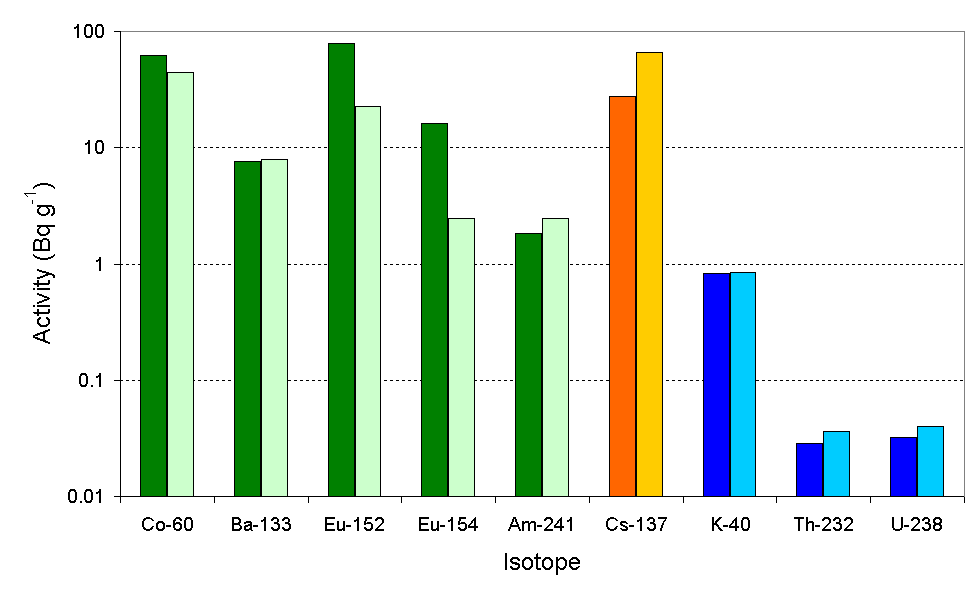
Levels of radioactivity in the Trinity glass at the time of explosion from two different samples as measured by gamma spectroscopy on lumps of the glass

The chaotic nature of trinitite's formation has led to variations in both its structure and composition. The glass has been described as "a layer 1 to 2 centimeters thick, with the upper surface marked by a very thin sprinkling of dust which fell upon it while it was still molten. At the bottom is a thicker film of partially fused material, which grades into the soil from which it was derived. The color of the glass is a pale bottle green, and the material is extremely vesicular with the size of the bubbles ranging to nearly the full thickness of the specimen." The most common form of trinitite is green fragments of 1–3 cm thick, smooth on one side and rough on the other; this is the trinitite that cooled after landing still-molten on the desert floor.

Around 30% of trinitite is void space, though their porosity varies widely between samples. Trinitite exhibits various other defects such as cracks. In trinitite that cooled after landing, the smooth upper surface contains large numbers of small vesicles, while the lower rough layer has lower vesicle density but larger vesicles. It is primarily alkaline.

One of the more unusual isotopes found in trinitite is a barium neutron activation product, the barium in the Trinity device coming from the slow explosive lens employed in the device, known as Baratol. Quartz is the only surviving mineral in most trinitite. Trinitite no longer contains sufficient radiation to be harmful unless swallowed. It still contains the radionuclides ^{241}Am, ^{137}Cs and ^{152}Eu owing to the Trinity test using a plutonium bomb.

== Variations ==
There are two forms of trinitite glass with differing refraction indices. The lower-index glass is composed largely of silicon dioxide, while the higher-index glass has a mixed composition. Red trinitite exists in both variants and contains glass rich in copper, iron, and lead as well as metallic globules. Black trinitite's colour is a result of being rich in iron.

In a study published in 2021 a sample of red trinitite was found to contain a previously undiscovered complex quasicrystal, the oldest known manmade quasicrystal, with a symmetry group in the shape of an icosahedron. It is composed of iron, silicon, copper and calcium. The quasicrystal's structure displays fivefold rotational symmetry. The quasicrystal research was led by geologist Luca Bindi of the University of Florence and Paul Steinhardt, after he theorised red trinitite was likely to contain quasicrystals as they often contain elements that rarely combine. The structure has a formula of Si_{61}Cu_{30}Ca_{7}Fe_{2}. A single 10μm grain was detected after ten months of work examining six small samples of red trinitite.

== Nuclear forensics ==
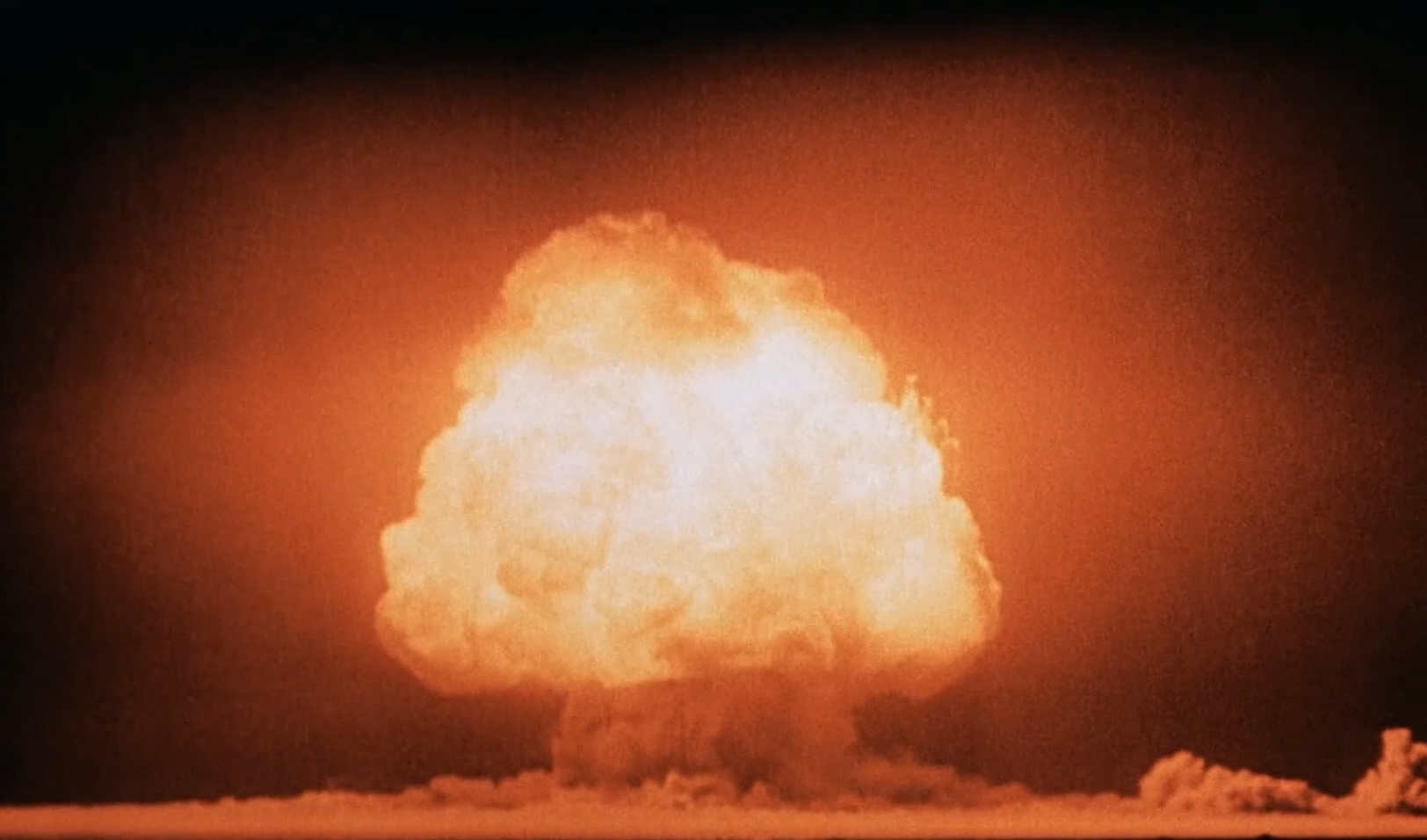
The mushroom cloud seconds after the detonation

A 2010 study in the open access journal Proceedings of the National Academy of Sciences examined trinitite's potential value to the field of nuclear forensics. Prior to this research, it was assumed that trinitite's components fused identically, and their original composition could not be discerned. The study demonstrated that glass from nuclear detonations could provide information about the device and associated components, such as packaging.

During the 2010s, millions of dollars in research were undertaken to examine trinitite and determine what information the glasses held that could help explain the nuclear explosion that created them. The researchers theorized that trinitite analysis may be useful for forensically identifying perpetrators of a future nuclear attack.

Researchers involved in the discovery of quasicrystals speculated that their work could improve efforts to investigate nuclear weapons proliferation because quasicrystals do not decay, unlike other evidence produced by nuclear weapons testing. Trinitite has been chosen as a research subject partly because the nuclear test was well-documented. A 2015 study in the Journal of Radioanalytical and Nuclear Chemistry funded by the National Nuclear Security Administration describes a method by which trinitite-like glass could be deliberately synthesized for use as test subjects for new nuclear forensic techniques. Laser ablation was first successfully used to identify the isotopic signature unique to the uranium within the bomb from a sample of trinitite, demonstrating this faster method's effectiveness.

== Cultural impact ==
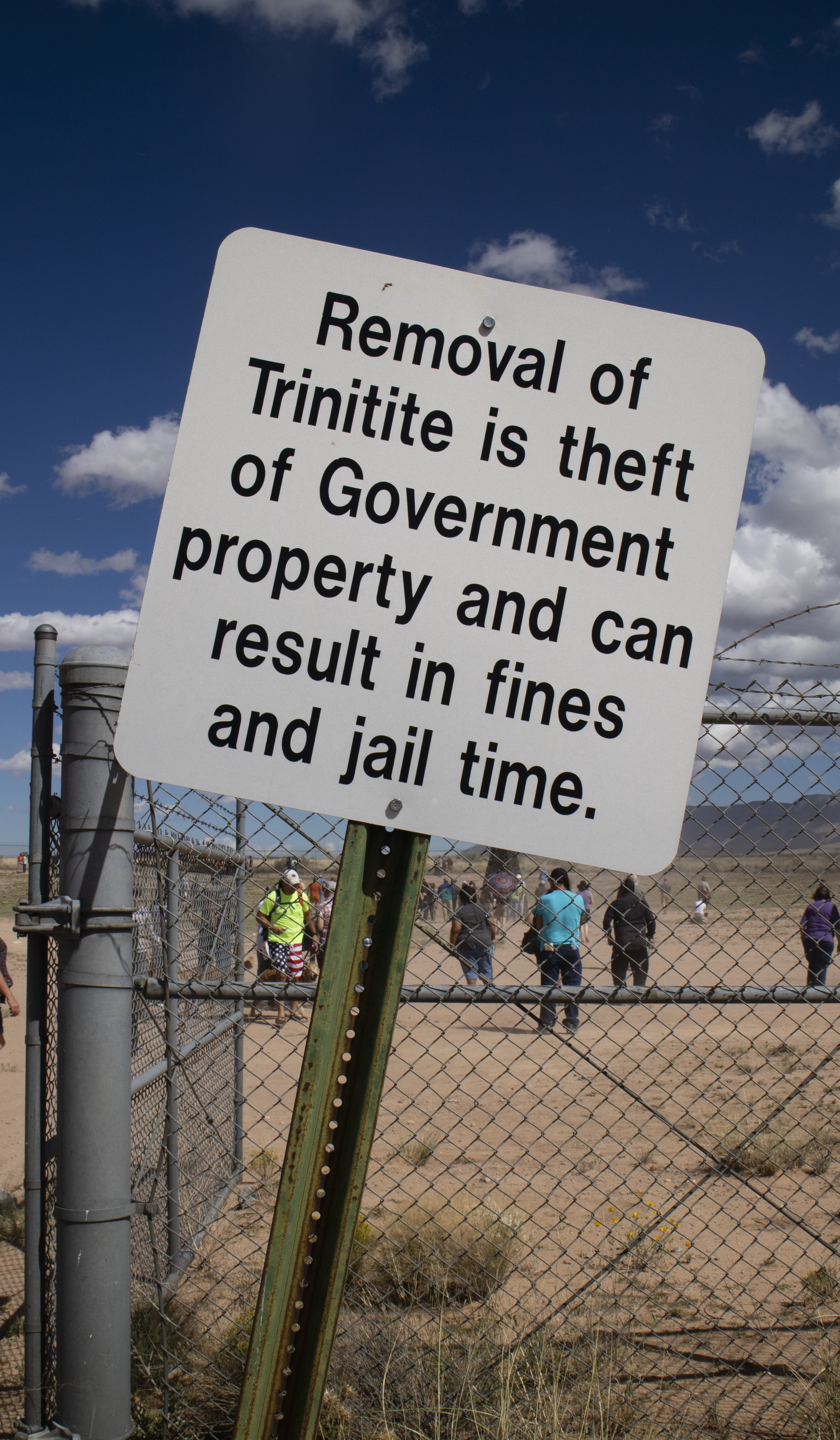
Sign at the test site warning of the illegality of collecting trinitite from the location

Trinitite was not initially considered remarkable in the context of the nuclear test and ongoing war, but when the war ended, visitors began to notice the glass and collect it as souvenirs. For a time, it was believed that the desert sand had simply melted from the direct radiant thermal energy of the fireball and was not particularly dangerous. Thus, it was marketed as suitable for use in jewelry in 1945 and 1946. It is now illegal to take the remaining material from the site, much of which has been removed by the US government and buried elsewhere in New Mexico; however, material that was taken prior to this prohibition is still in the hands of collectors and available legally in mineral shops. Counterfeit trinitite is also on the market; trinitite's authenticity requires scientific analysis. There are samples in the National Museum of Nuclear Science and History, Smithsonian National Museum of Natural History, the New Mexico Farm and Ranch Heritage Museum, and the Corning Museum of Glass;, the National Atomic Testing Museum houses a paperweight containing trinitite. In the United Kingdom, the Science Museum Group's collection contains a trinitite sample, as does the Canadian War Museum in Canada. There is also a Trinitite sample display at the Hiroshima Peace Memorial Museum in Hiroshima, Japan.

The SETI Institute, which seeks to find and research signs of intelligent life elsewhere in space, stated in 2021 that trinitite was to be included in their library of objects connected to "transformational moments" of potential interest to intelligent extraterrestrials. The sculpture Trinity Cube by Trevor Paglen, exhibited in 2019 at the Museum of Contemporary Art San Diego as part of a themed collection of Paglen's art titled Sights Unseen, is partially made from trinitite. The c.1988 artwork Trinitite, Ground Zero, Trinity Site, New Mexico by photographer Patrick Nagatani is housed at the Denver Art Museum.

== Similar materials ==
Occasionally, the name trinitite is broadly applied to all glassy residues of nuclear bomb testing, not just the Trinity test. Black vitreous fragments of fused sand that had been solidified by the heat of a nuclear explosion were created by French testing at the Reggane site in Algeria. Following the atomic bombing of Hiroshima, it was discovered in 2016 that between 0.6% and 2.5% of sand on local beaches was fused glass spheres formed during the bombing. Like trinitite, the glass contains material from the local environment, including materials from buildings destroyed in the attack. The material has been called hiroshimaite. Kharitonchiki (singular: kharitonchik, Russian: харитончик) is an analog of trinitite found in Semipalatinsk Test Site in Kazakhstan at ground zeroes of Soviet atmospheric nuclear tests. The porous black material is named after one of the leading Russian nuclear weapons scientists, Yulii Borisovich Khariton.

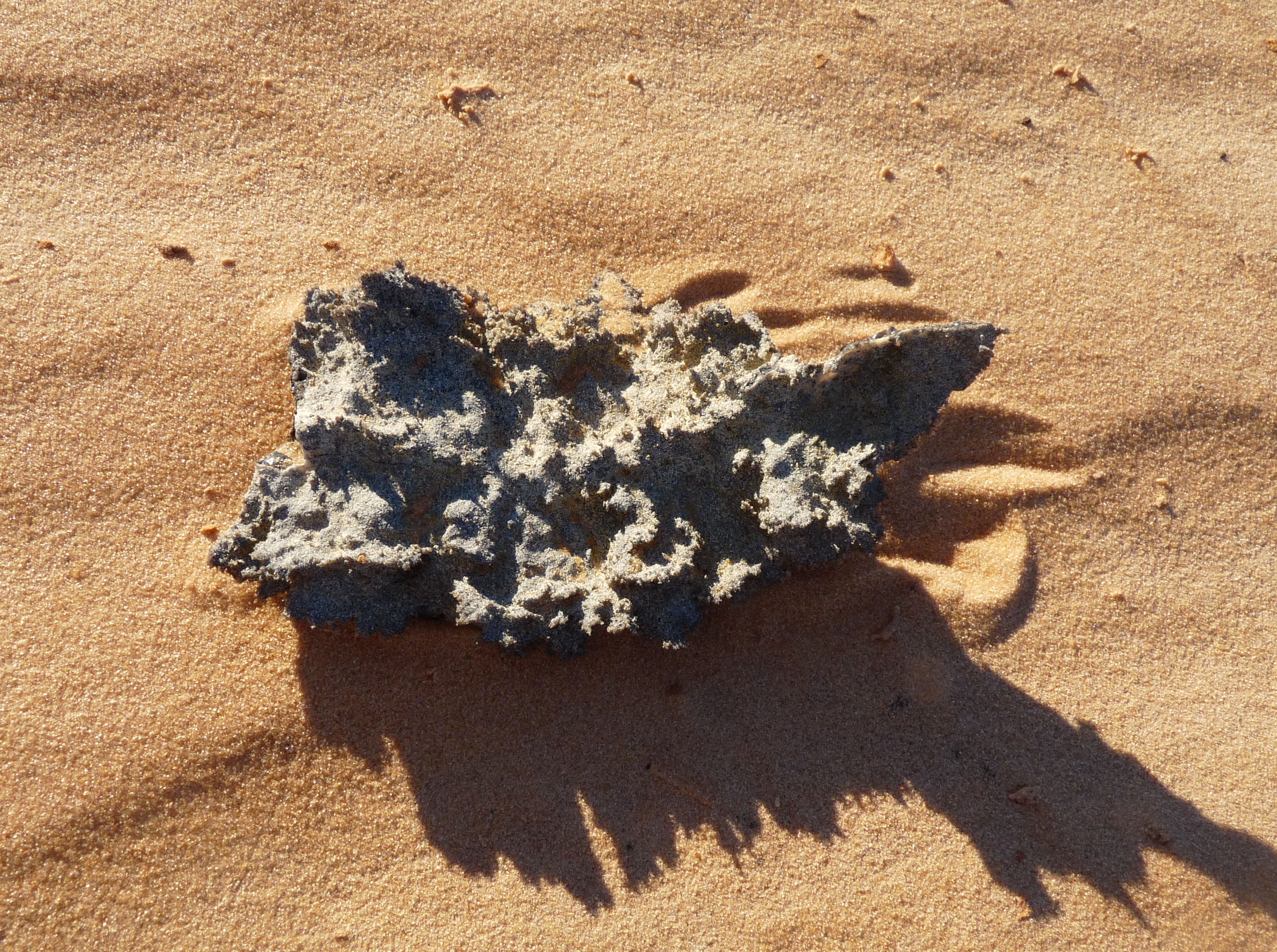
A fulgurite from the Mauritanian desert

Trinitite, in common with several similar naturally occurring minerals, is a melt glass. While trinitite and materials of similar formation processes such as lavinite are anthropogenic, fulgurites, found in many thunderstorm-prone regions and in deserts, are naturally-formed, glassy materials and are generated by lightning striking sediments such as sand. Impactite, a material similar to trinitite, can be formed by meteor impacts. The Moon's geology includes many rocks formed by one or more large impacts in which increasingly volatile elements are found in lower amounts the closer they are to the point of impact, similar to the distribution of volatile elements in trinitite.

== See also ==
- Chernobylite
- Corium
- Fulgurite
- Icosahedrite
- Impactite
- Lechatelierite
- Libyan desert glass
- Tektite
- Uranium glass
- Fordite
