= Fordite =

Layered automotive paint buildup which is cut, polished, and used in jewelry

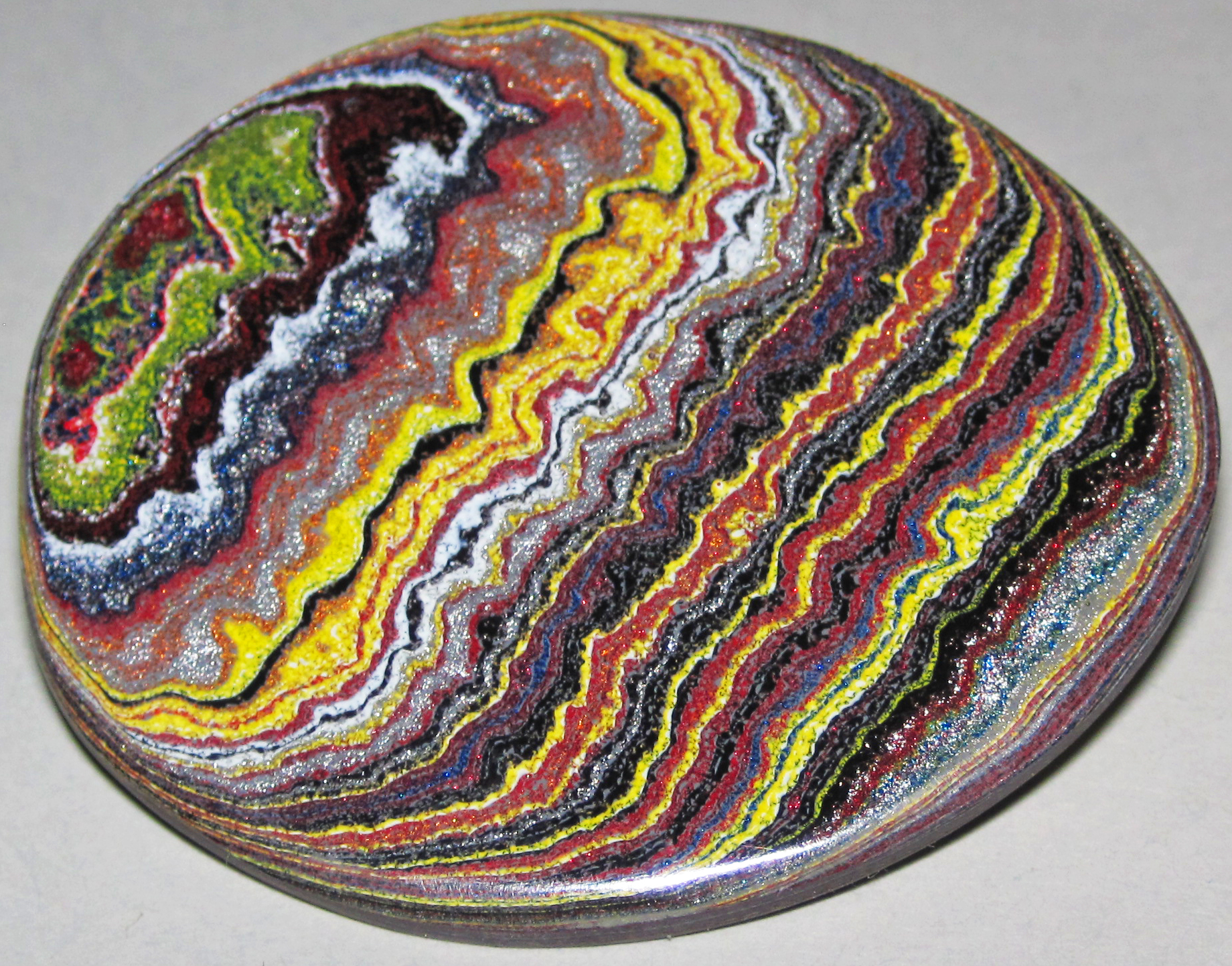
Fordite in Dearborn, Michigan, 2019

Fordite, also known as Detroit agate, Motor City agate, paint rock, or paint slag, is a lapidarist term for polished pieces of finely layered paint masses from automobile factories. The masses consist of automotive paint which has hardened sufficiently to be cut and polished. It was formed from the progressive buildup of layers of enamel paint on tracks and skids on which cars were painted with acrylic lacquer, which have been baked numerous times. In recent times the material has been upcycled into jewelry.

Fordite is notable for the way it displays "the history of the American automotive industry", both to illustrate the changing colors of car paint as well as the transformation and disappearance of the Ford Motor Company factories in Detroit.

== History ==
According to the Ford Motor Company, fordite has been around since the 1920s.

Gems & Gemology claims fordite "was first collected at Ford Motor Company in Michigan in the 1940s". The colors were initially dark and muted neutrals, though they still consisted of swirling patterns.

The colorful acrylic lacquers of the 1950s and 1960s caused fordite to appear "in bright metallic colors". The 1960s and 1970s allowed for the "boldest hues" as there was rising demand for more colorful vehicles during those decades.

The electrostatic spray painting process has replaced acrylic lacquer painting, meaning the supply of Fordite is limited. The electrostatic process "magnetizes the enamels to the car bodies", reducing or eradicating overspray.

== Composition ==
Fordite is made of hardened enamel paints. Many of these paints contain lead. This has led to restrictions on selling fordite jewelry in states such as California which have strict regulations on toxic substances.

== Gallery ==
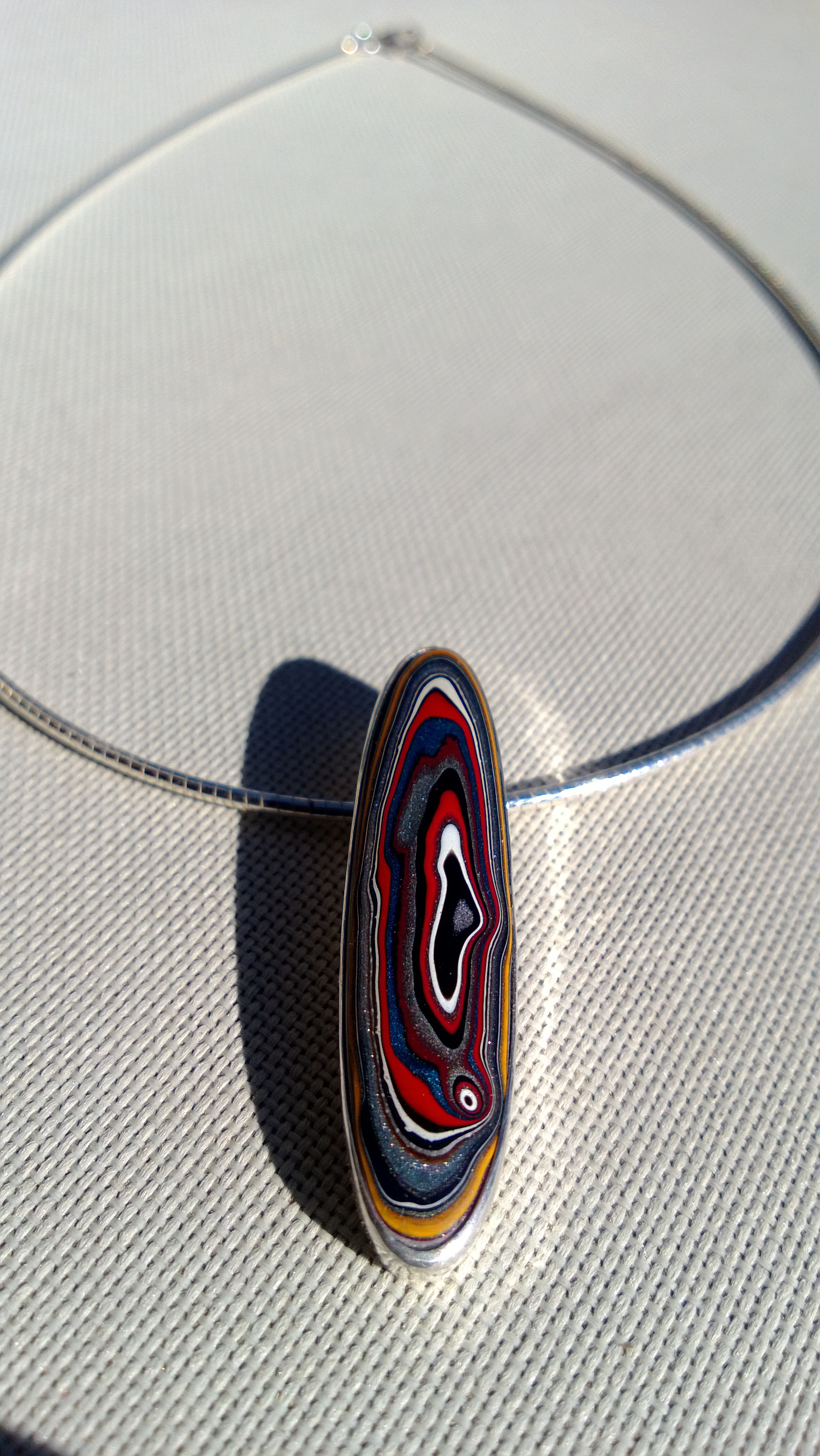
Handmade fordite pendant, 2013

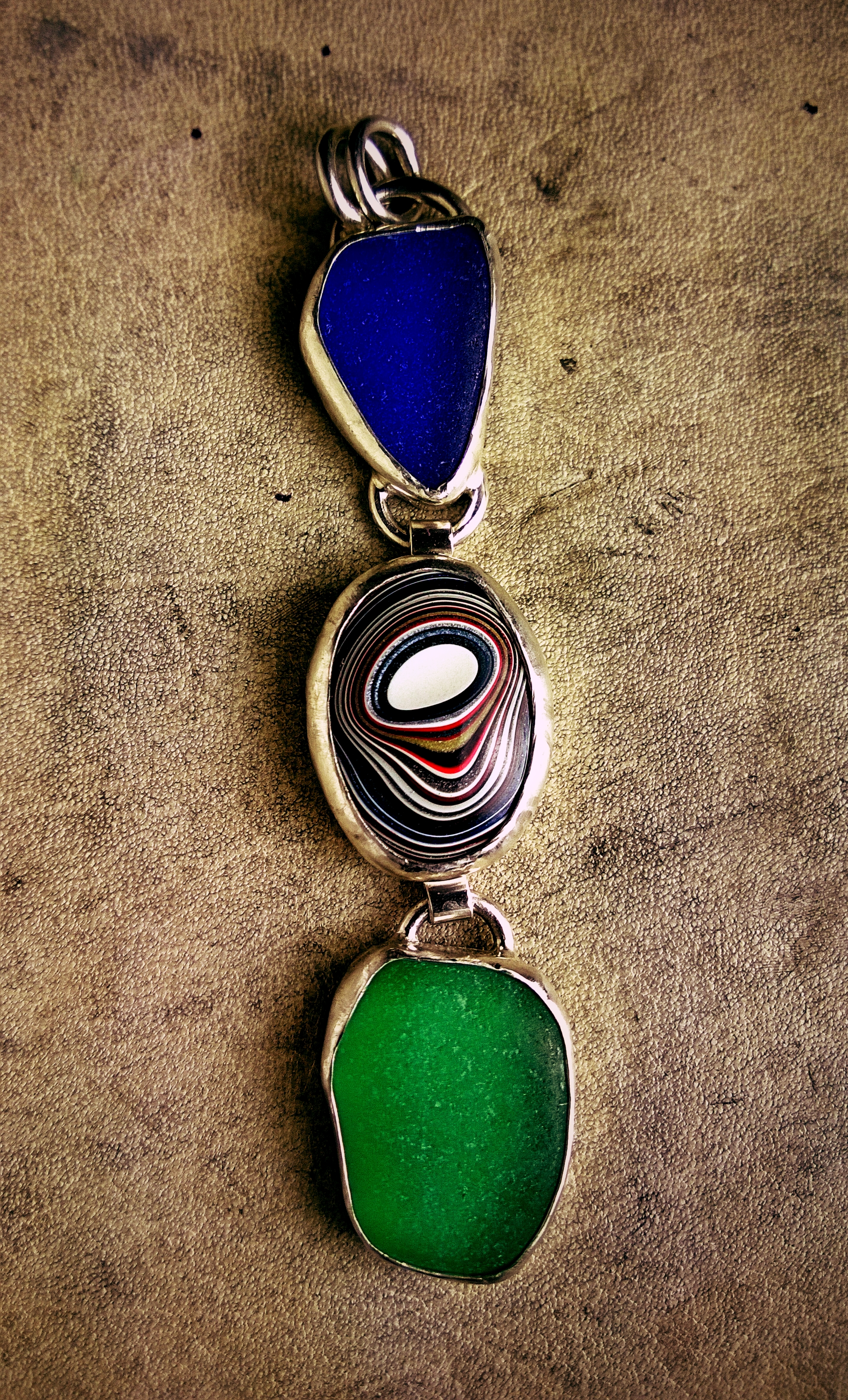
Fordite (center) on a piece of jewelry alongside blue and green beach glass, 2013

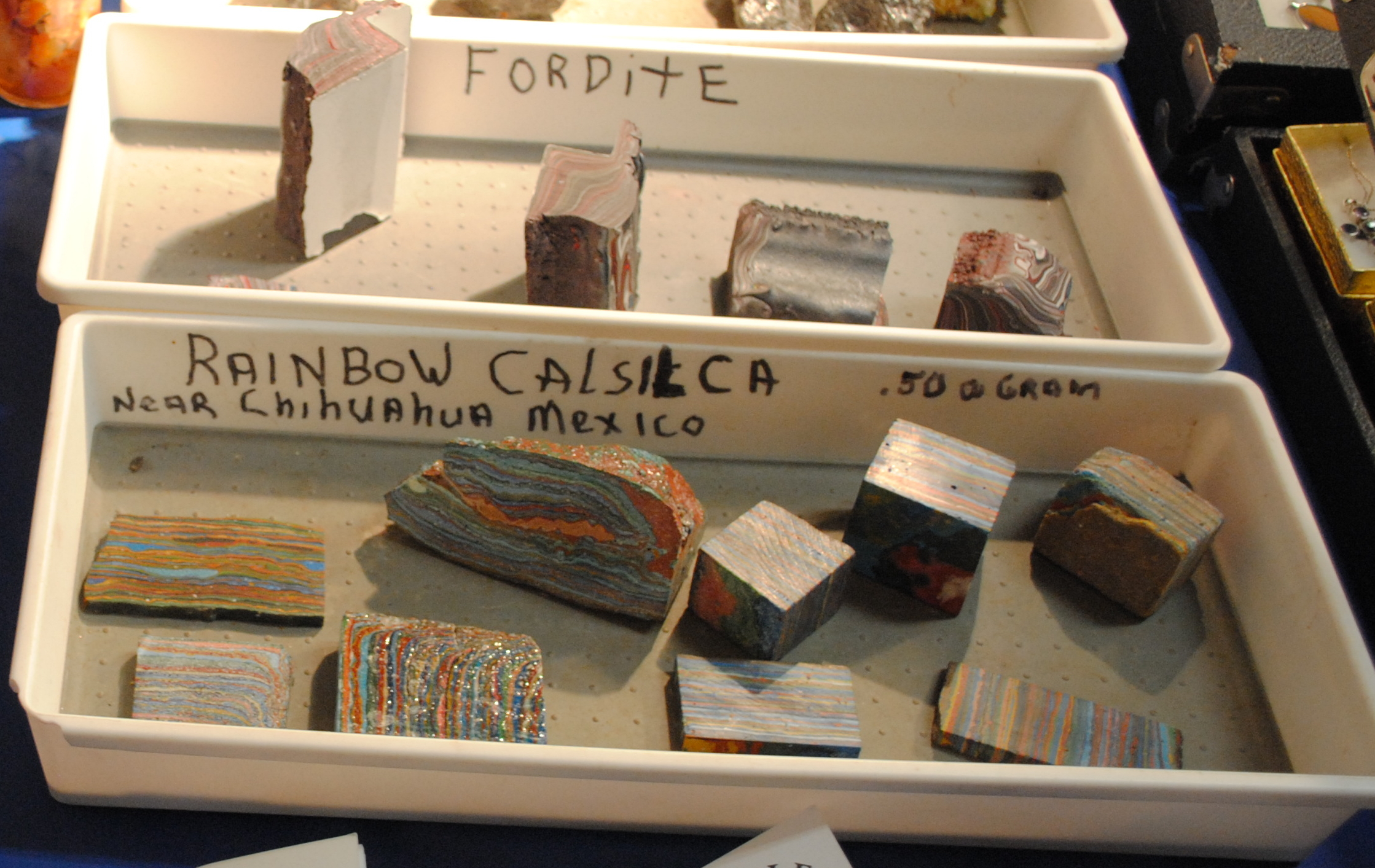
Raw and unpolished fordite on display above rainbow calsilica, which is meant to emulate fordite, 2016

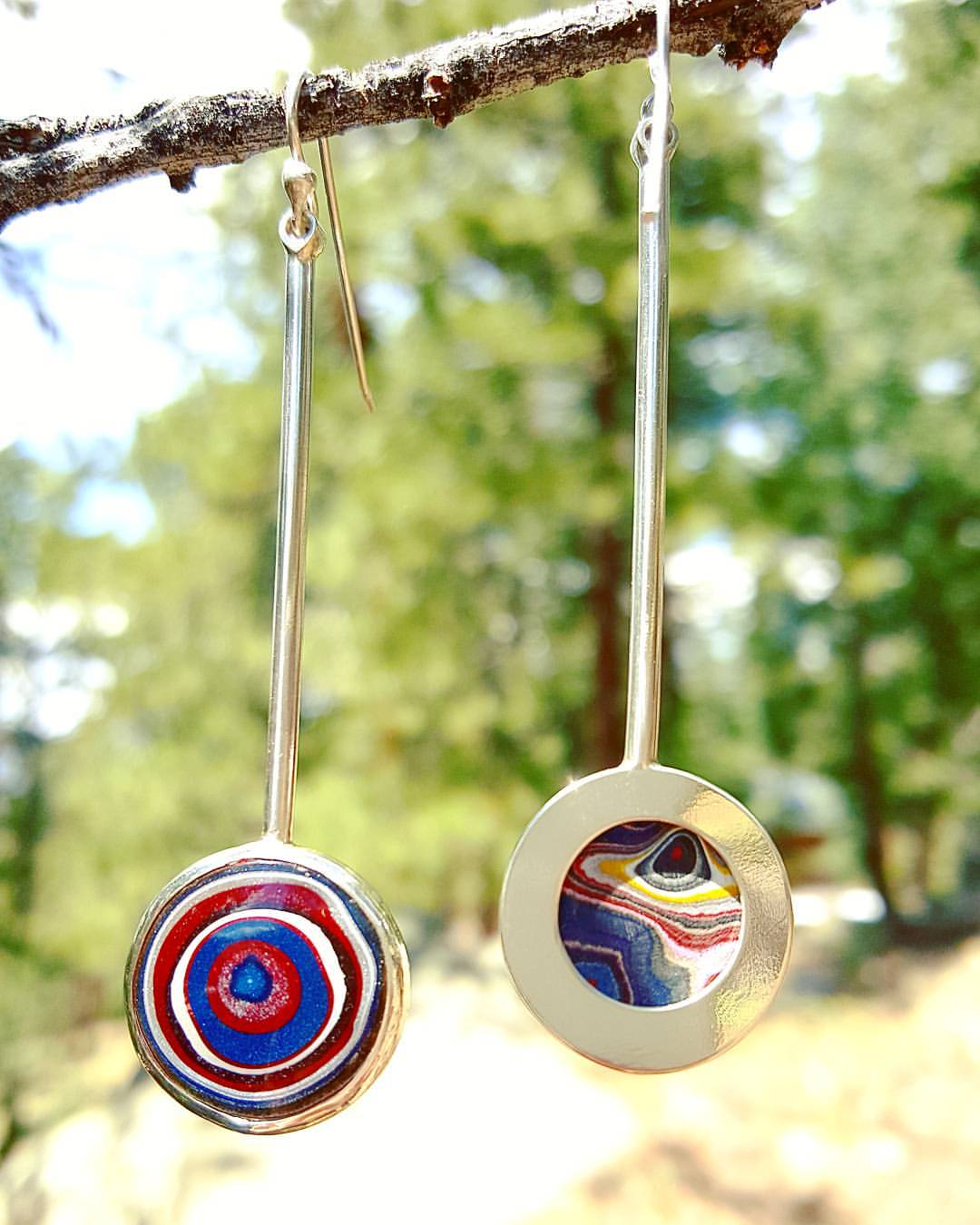
Handmade Fordite jewelry in Colorado, 2016

== See also ==
- Trinitite
- Corium (nuclear reactor)
- Calthemite
