= Elephant's Foot (Chernobyl) =

Radioactive mass created during meltdown

Coordinates: 51.3892°N 30.09833°E

Artur Korneyev's photo of the Elephant's Foot, 1996. His movements under a slow shutter speed likely caused his flashlight to look like lightning.

The Elephant's Foot (Ukrainian: Слонова нога, romanized: Slonova noha, Russian: Слоновья нога, romanized: Slonovya noga) is the nickname given to the large mass of corium beneath Reactor 4 of the Chernobyl Nuclear Power Plant, near Pripyat, Ukraine. The mass formed during the 1986 Chernobyl disaster from materials such as molten concrete, sand, steel, uranium, and zirconium. It is named for its wrinkled appearance and large size, evocative of the foot of an elephant.

Discovered in December 1986, the "foot" is located in a maintenance corridor below the remains of Reactor No. 4, though the often-photographed formation is only a small portion of several larger corium masses in the area. It has a popular reputation as being one of the most, if not the most radioactive object in history, though this is false. There are several more radioactive masses of corium at Chernobyl, and a spent nuclear fuel rod can emit as much as 10 times the radiation of the Elephant's Foot. Decay of its radioactive components has also significantly reduced the radiation.

== Origin ==
The Elephant's Foot is a mass of black corium with many layers, resembling tree bark and glass when it was initially discovered. It was formed during the Chernobyl disaster of April 1986 from a lava-like mixture of molten core materials such as zirconium and uranium oxide, materials from the Lower Biological Shield of the reactor such as steel and serpentinite, silicates and various construction materials like concrete and sand.

The Elephant's Foot is part of what is known as the "Horizontal Flow". Immediately after the explosion, corium began pooling in the room directly beneath the reactor, the Sub-Reactor room 305/2, +9.0 meters (29.5 ft) above ground level, or the fourth floor. Several days after the accident, some of the corium in 305/2 spilled down through steam vents into the steam suppression system, becoming the "Large Vertical Flow" and "Small Vertical Flow". Other corium in 305/2 melted through 2 meters (6 ft 7 in) of reinforced concrete in the wall between 305/2 and 304/3, becoming the "Horizontal Flow". From 304/3, it spilled out into the corridor 301/5, and flowed like lava along the floor, before entering 301/6. Through several holes intended for cables, the corium flowed downwards into several distinct masses in the cable corridor 217/2, on +6.0, or the 3rd floor. These distinct masses included several stalactites varying in size, with the largest of them being partially buried in concrete, hiding its true size. The Elephant's Foot was the largest of these 3 masses in the room 217/2. On the floor plans, the foot is located 2 meters north of Row "E"/"Ye" and 3 meters (9.8 ft) east of Axis 44. The Foot is located on the corner of 2 walls in 217/2, and borders a staircase leading down to 017/2 on the ground floor of the building. A small piece of corium was found in room 017/2. It is theorized that this piece fell down the stairs during efforts to sample the Elephant's Foot.

== Composition ==
The Elephant's Foot is a black ceramic composed primarily of silicon dioxide, with smaller amounts of other oxides, primarily uranium, calcium, iron, zirconium, aluminum, magnesium, and potassium. Over time, zircon crystals have started to form slowly within the mass as it cools, and crystalline uranium dioxide dendrites are growing quickly and breaking down repeatedly. Despite the distribution of uranium-bearing particles not being uniform, the radioactivity of the mass is evenly distributed. The mass was quite dense and unyielding to efforts to collect samples for analysis via a drill mounted on a remote-controlled trolley. Armor-piercing rounds fired from a rifle were required to break off usable chunks. By June 1998, the outer layers had started turning to dust and the mass had started to crack, as the radioactive components were starting to disintegrate to a point where the structural integrity of the glass was failing. In 2021, the mass was described as having a consistency similar to sand.

== Discovery ==
In late June 1986, two dosimetrists, Mikhail Kostyakov and Vladimir Kabanov, were in the corridor 017/2 on the level OTM (Above Ground Level) +0.0 (Metres), searching for an access route to the corridors on the same floor as the sub reactor space from below. Despite them being 12 meters (39 ft) below the core, and 15 meters (49 ft) to the southeast, their dosimeters read 25 roentgens per hour. Coming across a staircase that led up to the corridor 217/2 on OTM +6.0, they began slowly ascending with the dosimeter, as that was where the radiation was coming from. Eventually, their dosimeter, which could read a peak of 3,000 roentgens per hour, went off the scale and broke. The pair left the dosimeter on the stairs and ran. This was the first highly radioactive gamma source encountered inside Unit 4. Unbeknownst to them, they had discovered The Elephant's Foot. Relative to them ascending the stairs, it would have been behind them.

Months later, in November and December 1986, Vasya Koryagin, another dosimetrist, became interested in the room directly underneath the reactor, room 305/2, on OTM +9.0, the fourth floor. It contained a steel cross that was holding up the Lower Biological Shield (Scheme OR), a serpentinite steel "cap" for the bottom of the core. Some had theorized that the scheme OR was still intact; others believed that there was a large hole in it. Koryagin wished to solve this mystery. In December, Koryagin, after being authorized by his superior Vladimir Azmolov, entered the sarcophagus from the Vent Block to the east of Unit 4. Since the construction of the sarcophagus, concrete had been both purposefully and sometimes inadvertently pumped through the corridors of Unit 4 to stabilize the structure, due to fears that the sarcophagus was too heavy for the decaying structure of Unit 4 to handle. Koryagin's route intended for him to descend the staircase marked "257" on the floorplans down to +9.0. There, he would take a left into the corridor 301/6, a right into 318/2 and then the first door to his left would lead to 305/2. At some point Koryagin lost count of how many floors he had descended. Descending the staircase, he eventually came across a corridor filled with concrete that he was unable to enter. Unbeknownst to him, this was OTM +9.0, the floor that he was looking for. He descended another floor down to OTM +6.0, thinking that he was now at OTM +9.0. Here, he found another large concrete flow, however it was arranged in a manner that he could crawl through. He did, and very suddenly as he emerged from the tight crawlspace, his dosimeter reached 50 roentgens per hour, the air around him became immensely hot, and at the end of the corridor was a black, glassy mass that he knew was the source of the radiation. Unbeknownst to him, he had entered 217/2, the resting place of The Elephant's Foot, and he was facing it from the north. Using the inverse square law, he estimated the distance to be 20 meters (66 ft), and using his measurement of 50 roentgens per hour, determined the object was emitting 20,000 roentgens per hour, lethal in less than 90 seconds. The actual number was only 10,000 roentgens per hour.

He believed the door to 318/2 was just beyond the object. He ran down the corridor, but was only able to find a staircase behind the object and not the door he was looking for. He ran back and left the sarcophagus, never having entered 305/2, and reported his findings to his superiors, Konstantin Checherov and Alexander Borovoi. Koryagin would have never been able to access 305/2 anyway, as the entrances to it were completely filled by concrete and debris. It would take nearly an entire year of digging boreholes before 305/2 was able to be accessed, in late 1988.

After Koryagin's discovery, his superiors initially believed he had found molten lead that had been dropped into the core by helicopters, but weren't entirely sure. Within a month, professional photographer Valentin Obodzinsky was sent in. Obodzinsky took the first photograph of the Elephant's Foot sometime between December 25 and December 31, 1986. It wouldn't take long before more people visited. Samples were collected using an AKM rifle to chip off pieces, other attempts to use a remote-controlled drill failed.

== Radioactivity ==
At the time of its discovery, about eight months after formation, radioactivity on the surface of the Elephant's Foot was approximately 8,000 to 10,000 roentgens per hour, or 80 to 100 grays per hour, delivering a 50/50 lethal dose of radiation (4.5 grays) within 3 minutes. Since that time, the radiation intensity has declined significantly, and in 1996, the Elephant's Foot was briefly visited by the deputy director of the New Safe Confinement Project, Artur Korneyev, (Note: Korneyev was interviewed by The New York Times reporter Henry Fountain in 2014 in Slavutich, Ukraine, before his retirement.) who took photographs using an automatic camera and a flashlight to illuminate the otherwise dark room. This photo would become the most famous photograph of the Elephant's Foot.

In 1989, the Foot showed a peak of 1,100 roentgens per hour on the surface. These levels were reduced to 700 roentgens per hour in the year 2000 according to Igor Kabachenko's Cartograms.

Some theories have suggested the Elephant Foot's initial radioactivity was caused by the ruthenium-106 isotope, due to the relatively fast drop-off of radioactivity from 8,000 roentgens per hour to 1,000 roentgens per hour after just 3 years, lining up with the half life of ruthenium-106. Molten metals extracted from the destroyed Unit 4 were found to emit much higher levels of radiation than the corium.

The Elephant's Foot is roughly 10% uranium by mass, which is an alpha emitter. While alpha radiation is ordinarily unable to penetrate the skin, it is the most damaging form of radiation when radioactive particles are inhaled or ingested. This renewed concerns as some samples of material from the meltdown (including the Elephant's Foot) have turned to dust. Nevertheless, the corium still poses an external gamma radiation hazard due to the presence of fission products, mainly caesium-137.

== See also ==
- Chernobylite – Technogenic mineral
- Demon core – 1945–1946 sphere of plutonium
- Trinitite – Glassy mineral left in the dirt after the plutonium-based Trinity bomb test
