= Taikisha =

Taikisha Global Ltd.
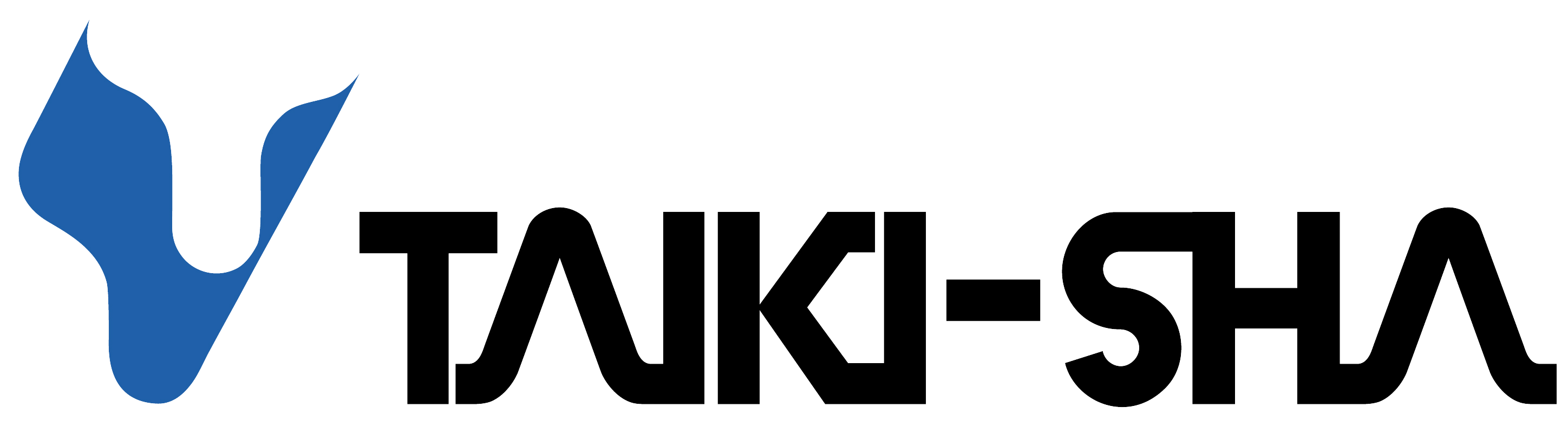

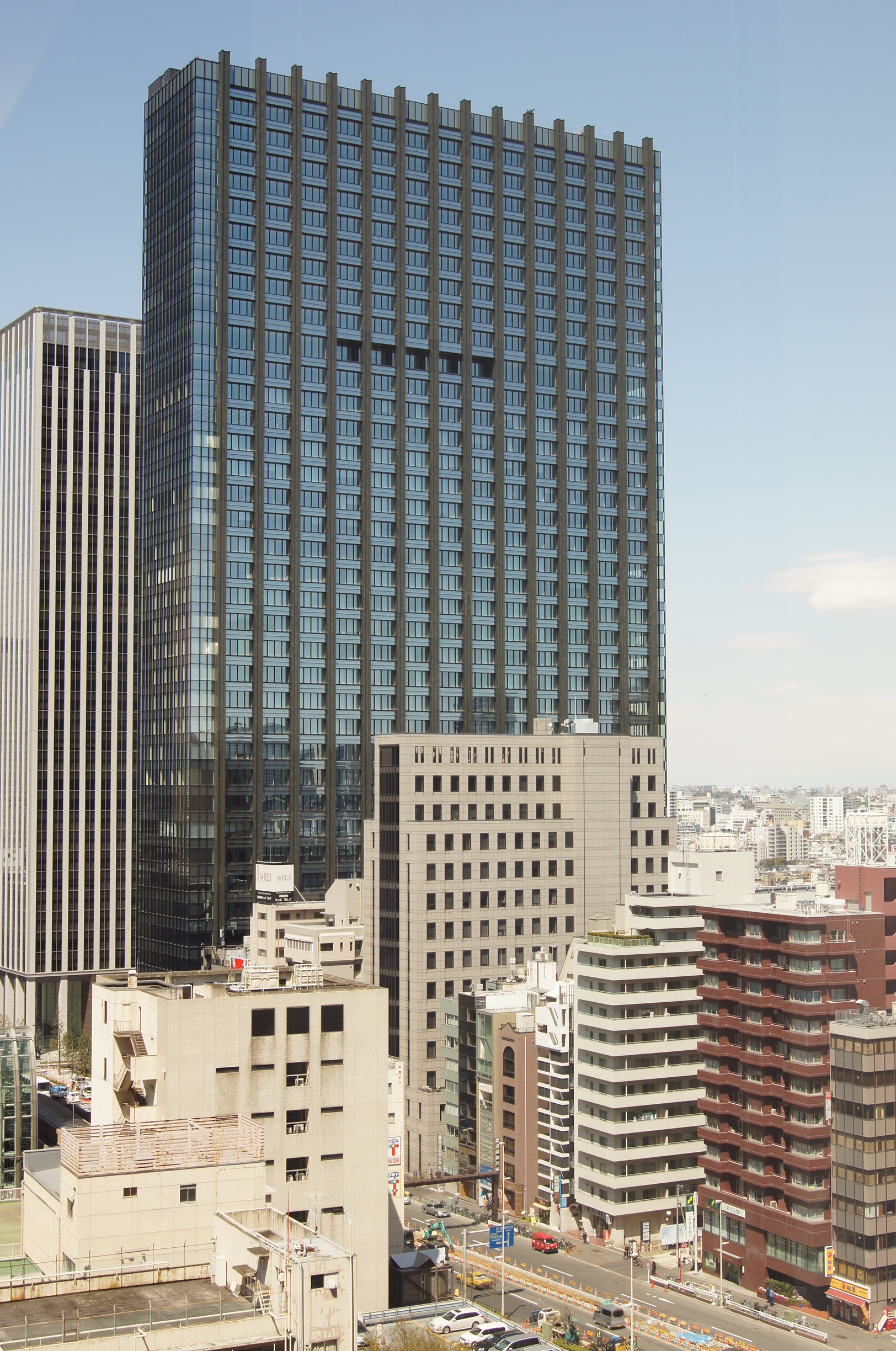
- Taikisha World Headquarters; Shinjuku Grand Tower - Tokyo, Japan
- Type: Public
- Traded as: TYO: 1979 Tokyo Stock Exchange
- Industry: HVAC Construction Engineering
- Headquarters: Tokyo, Japan
- Number of locations: 50+ facilities in 24 countries
- Area served: Worldwide (except Africa, Australia, North Korea, Cuba, Iran, Sudan, and Syria)
- Key people: Satoru Kamiyama (President); Koji Kato (CEO); Eitaro Uenishi (Chairman)
- Products: Commercial building HVAC; Automotive paint Equipment; Air Pollution Control Equipm.
- Services: Engineering; Consulting
- Revenue: ▲US$ 1.70 billion (2015)
- Operating income: ▲US$ 69.0 million (2015)
- Net income: ▼US$ 50.0 million (2015)
- Total assets: ▲US$ 1.5 billion (2014)
- Total equity: ▼US$ 890 million (2014)
- Number of employees: 5,000 (2015)
- Website: tksindustrial.com

Taikisha Global Limited, commonly known as Taikisha or TKS, is a Japanese multinational corporation headquartered in Tokyo, Japan, that designs, fabricates, installs, and commissions large-scale heating, ventilation, and air conditioning (HVAC) systems for large infrastructures and industrial process equipment.

== History ==
The company was founded in 1913 by Uenishi. In 1952, the paint plant business begins. In 1971, Taikisha established a new office in Bangkok, Thailand. Then in 1974, it was listed on the Tokyo Stock Exchange.

Taikisha founded TKS Industrial Company in the United States in 1981, Taikisha Canada in 1985, Taikisha España in 1987, Taikisha United Kingdom Ltd and Malaysia Kuala Lumpur Engineering in 1989, Taikisha Indonesia Engineering and Taikisha de Mexico SA de CV in 1990, Taikisha Korea in 1991, Goshu Process Co. Ltd (China) in 1994, Taikisha Engineering India, Philippines and Vietnam in 1995, Taikisha Brazil in 1996, Hong Kong in 2000. In 2004, the group founded Tianjin Azuma Tsubaki (paint transport system equipment) in China.

In 2007, Taikisha reorganized into two divisions: Paint Systems division and Environmental Systems division. In 2011, Taikisha Paint division globally partnered with Geico Paint Systems, headquartered in Italy. In 2015, Taikisha U.S. - TKS Industrial acquired Encore Automation.

== Activities ==
Taikisha Global is divided into two core business units:

- Green Technology
- Paint Finishing

Taikisha Global has corporate offices in 24 countries.

Taikisha Global Offices
#	Country	City	Year established
1	Japan	Tokyo	1913
2	United States	Detroit	1981
3	China	Beijing	1994
4	Brazil	São Paulo	1996
5	Canada	Toronto	1985
6	Russia	Moscow	2009
7	Taiwan	Taipei	1989
8	Mexico	Mexico City	1990
9	Thailand	Bangkok	1969
10	South Korea	Seoul	1991
11	France	Montbeliard	2011
12	Spain	Madrid	2011
13	Argentina	Buenos Aires	1997
14	Indonesia	Jakarta	1990
15	Cambodia	Phnom Penh	2011
16	India	New Delhi	1995
17	United Kingdom	Birmingham, UK	1989
18	Vietnam	Hanoi	1998
19	Malaysia	Kuala Lumpur	1989
