= Chernobylite =

Technogenic mineral

Chernobylite is a solid solution technogenic compound consisting of a crystalline zirconium silicate and an amount of uranium as high as 10%.

It was discovered in corium (a lava-like glassy material) that was formed during the nuclear meltdown of Unit 4 in the Chernobyl disaster. Chernobylite is highly radioactive due to its substantial uranium content and contamination by fission products, but it is no more radioactive than the corium itself.

Some yellow, powdery, secondary uranyl phases made up of studtite, becquerelite and phurcalite that formed on the surface of the corium due to interaction with water are often mistaken for Chernobylite. True chernobylite cannot be seen with the naked eye, as it appears as microscopic crystals that can only be viewed with a scanning electron microscope.

== See also ==
- Elephant's Foot – Radioactive mass created during meltdown
- Trinitite – Glassy mineral left in the dirt after the plutonium-based Trinity bomb test
