= Lunarcrete =

Hypothetical aggregate building material, similar to concrete, formed from lunar regolith

Laboratory-determined properties for lunarcrete
- Compressive strength: 39–75.7 N/mm^{2} (MPa)
- Young's modulus: 21.4 kN/mm^{2}
- Density: 2.6 g/cm^{3}
- Temperature coefficient: 5.4 × 10^{−6} K^{−1}

Lunarcrete, also known as "mooncrete", an idea first proposed by Larry A. Beyer of the University of Pittsburgh in 1985, is a hypothetical construction aggregate, similar to concrete, formed from lunar regolith, that would reduce the construction costs of building on the Moon. AstroCrete is a more general concept also applicable for Mars.

== Ingredients ==
Only comparatively small amounts of Moon rock have been transported to Earth, so in 1988 researchers at the University of North Dakota proposed simulating the construction of such a material by using lignite coal ash. Other researchers have used the subsequently developed lunar regolith simulant materials, such as JSC-1 (developed in 1994 and as used by Toutanji et al.) and LHS-1 (developed and produced by Exolith Lab). Some small-scale testing, with actual regolith, has been performed in laboratories, however.

The basic ingredients for lunarcrete would be the same as those for terrestrial concrete: aggregate, water, and cement. In the case of lunarcrete, the aggregate would be lunar regolith. The cement would be manufactured by beneficiating lunar rock that had a high calcium content. Water would either be supplied from off the Moon, or by combining oxygen with hydrogen produced from lunar soil.

Lin et al. used 40 g of the lunar regolith samples obtained by Apollo 16 to produce lunarcrete in 1986. The lunarcrete was cured by using steam on a dry aggregate/cement mixture. Lin proposed that the water for such steam could be produced by mixing hydrogen with lunar ilmenite at 800 °C, to produce titanium oxide, iron, and water. It was capable of withstanding compressive pressures of 75 MPa, and lost only 20% of that strength after repeated exposure to vacuum.

In 2008, Houssam Toutanji, of the University of Alabama in Huntsville, and Richard Grugel, of the Marshall Space Flight Center, used a lunar soil simulant to determine whether lunarcrete could be made without water, using sulfur (obtainable from lunar dust) as the binding agent. The process to create this sulfur concrete required heating the sulfur to 130–140 °C. After exposure to 50 cycles of temperature changes, from −27 °C to room temperature, the simulant lunarcrete was found to be capable of withstanding compressive pressures of 17 MPa, which Toutanji and Grugel believed could be raised to 20 MPa if the material were reinforced with silica (also obtainable from lunar dust).

== Casting and production ==
There would need to be significant infrastructure in place before industrial scale production of lunarcrete could be possible.

The casting of lunarcrete would require a pressurized environment, because attempting to cast in a vacuum would simply result in the water sublimating, and the lunarcrete failing to harden. Two solutions to this problem have been proposed: premixing the aggregate and the cement and then using a steam injection process to add the water, or the use of a pressurized concrete fabrication plant that produces pre-cast concrete blocks.

Lunarcrete shares the same lack of tensile strength as terrestrial concrete. One suggested lunar equivalent tensioning material for creating pre-stressed concrete is lunar glass, also formed from regolith, much as fibreglass is already sometimes used as a terrestrial concrete reinforcement material. Another tensioning material, suggested by David Bennett, is Kevlar, imported from Earth (which would be cheaper, in terms of mass, to import from Earth than conventional steel).

== Sulfur-based waterless concrete ==
This proposal is based on the observation that water is likely to be a precious commodity on the Moon. Additionally, sulfur gains strength in a very short time and does not need any period of cooling, unlike hydraulic cement. This would reduce the time that human astronauts would need to be exposed to the surface lunar environment.

Sulfur is present on the Moon in the form of the mineral troilite (FeS), and could be reduced to obtain sulfur. It also does not require the extremely high temperatures needed for extraction of cementitious components (e.g. anorthosites).

Sulfur concrete is an established construction material. Strictly speaking it is not a concrete as there is little by way of chemical reaction. Instead the sulfur acts as a thermoplastic material binding with a non reactive substrate. Cement and water are not required. The concrete does not have to be cured, instead it is simply heated to above the melting point of sulfur, 140 °C, and after cooling it reaches high strength immediately.

The best mixture for tensile and compressive strength is 65% JSC-1 lunar regolith simulant and 35% sulfur, with an average compressive strength of 33.8 MPa and tensile strength of 3.7 MPa. Addition of 2% metal fiber increase the compressive strength to 43.0 MPa Addition of silica also increases the strength of the concrete.

This sulfur concrete could be of especial value for dust minimization, for instance to create a launching pad for rockets leaving the Moon.

=== Issues with sulfur concrete ===
It provides less protection from cosmic radiation, so walls would need to be thicker than Portland-cement-based concrete walls (the water in concrete is an especially good absorber of cosmic radiation).

Sulfur melts at 115.2 °C, and lunar temperatures in high latitudes can reach 123 °C at midday. In addition, the temperature changes could change the volume of the sulfur concrete due to polymorphic transitions in the sulfur. See Allotropes of sulfur.

So unprotected sulfur concrete on the Moon, if directly exposed to the surface temperatures, would need to be limited to higher latitudes or shaded locations with maximum temperatures less than 96 °C and monthly variations not exceeding 114 °C.

The material would degrade through repeated temperature cycles, but the effects are likely to be less extreme on the Moon due to the slowness of the monthly temperature cycle. The outer few millimeters may be damaged through sputtering from impact of high energy particles from the solar wind and solar flares. This may however be easy to repair, by reheating or recoating the surface layers in order to sinter away cracks and heal the damage.

== AstroCrete ==
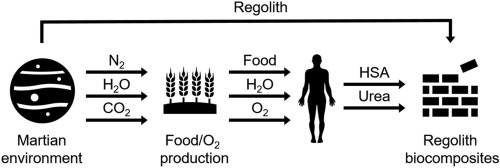
Graphical abstract of AstroCrete concept

AstroCrete is a concrete-like material proposed to be used on Moon or Mars made from regolith and human serum albumin (HSA), a protein from human blood. Scientists demonstrated that such material had compressive strengths as high as 25 MPa, while ordinary concrete had 20–32 MPa. By adding urea (byproduct in urine, sweat, and tears), the resultant material became substantially stronger than ordinary concrete, with 40 MPa of compressive strength.

As noted by the authors:

In essence, human serum albumin produced by astronauts in vivo could be extracted on a semi-continuous basis and combined with lunar or Martian regolith to 'get stone from blood', to rephrase the proverb. We believe that human serum albumin extraterrestrial regolith biocomposites could potentially have a significant role in a nascent Martian colony.

Researchers also experimented with synthetic spider silk and bovine serum albumin as regolith binders, noting that these materials could also be produced on Mars after advancements in biomanufacturing technology.

The idea behind AstroCrete is not new, that is acknowledged by authors: "adhesives and binders of biological origin were widely utilized by humanity for millennia before the development of synthetic petroleum-derived adhesives. Tree resins, collagen from hooves, casein from cheese, and animal blood were all used as binders and additives for various applications".

Researchers calculated that a crew of 6 astronauts could produce over 500 kg of AstroCrete over the course of a two-year mission on the surface of Mars. Each astronaut "could produce enough additional habitat space to support another astronaut, potentially allowing the steady expansion of an early Martian colony".

In 2023, A.D. Roberts, wrote a story on the use of 'AstroCrete' being tested in the creation of a building material on Mars in order to overcome the challenge of obtaining bulk material for construction on the planet.

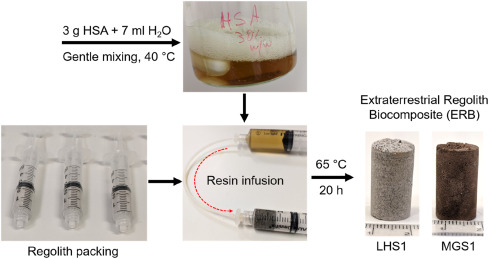
Scheme depicting the typical fabrication procedure for producing HSA-based biocomposites

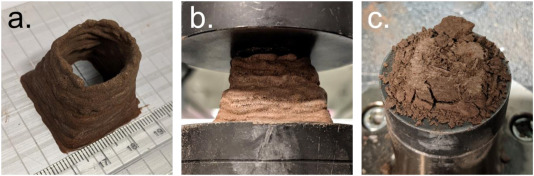
3D-printed Astrocrete samples. (a) after fabrication, (b) during compression testing, and (c) after compression testing.

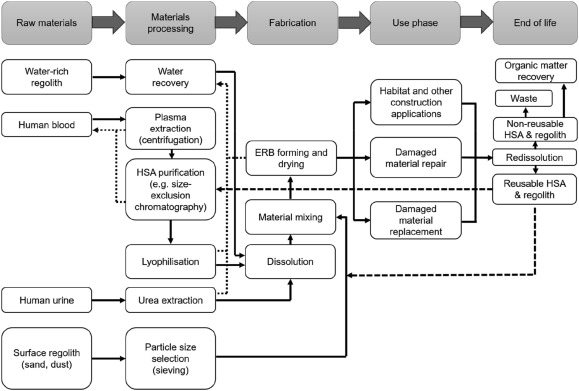
Life-cycle process flow diagram for HSA/Urea-based biocomposites

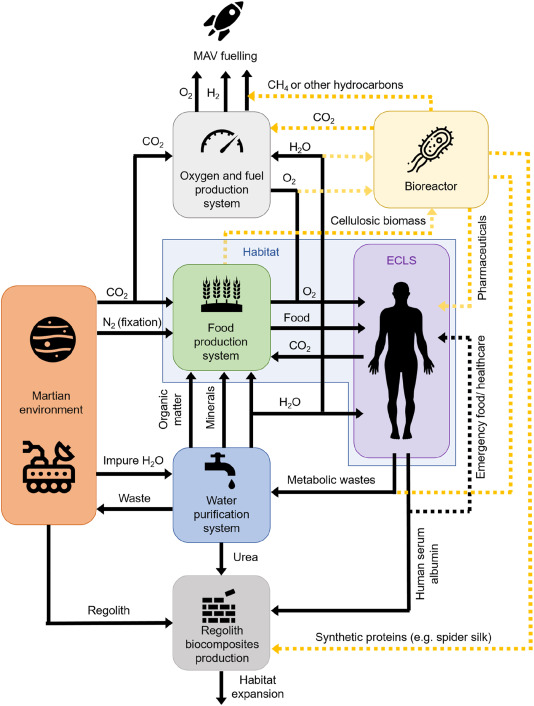
A hypothetical block diagram depicting how HSA could be produced in vivo from in situ resources available on Mars

== Use ==
David Bennett, of the British Cement Association, argues that lunarcrete has the following advantages as a construction material for lunar bases:

- Lunarcrete production would require less energy than lunar production of steel, aluminium, or brick.
- It is unaffected by temperature variations of 120 °C to −150 °C.
- It will absorb gamma rays.
- Material integrity is not affected by prolonged exposure to vacuum. Although free water will evaporate from the material, the water that is chemically bound as a result of the curing process will not.

He observes, however, that lunarcrete is not an airtight material, and to make it airtight would require the application of an epoxy coating to the interior of any lunarcrete structure.

Bennett suggests that hypothetical lunar buildings made of lunarcrete would most likely use a low-grade concrete block for interior compartments and rooms, and a high-grade dense silica particle cement-based concrete for exterior skins.

== See also ==
- In situ resource utilization – Astronautical use of materials harvested in outer space
- Lunar resources
