= Sulfur concrete =

Composite construction material with elemental sulfur as a binder

Sulfur concrete, sometimes named thioconcrete or sulfurcrete, is a composite construction material, composed mainly of sulfur and aggregate (generally a coarse aggregate made of gravel or crushed rocks and a fine aggregate such as sand). Cement and water, important compounds in normal concrete, are not part of sulfur concrete. The concrete is heated above the melting point of elemental sulfur (115.21 °C (239.38 °F)) at ca. 140 °C (284 °F) in a ratio of between 12% and 25% sulfur, the rest being aggregate.

Low-volatility (i.e., with a high boiling point) organic admixtures (sulfur modifiers), such as dicyclopentadiene (DCPD), styrene, turpentine, or furfural, are also added to the molten sulfur to inhibit its crystallization and to stabilize its polymeric structure after solidification.

In the absence of modifying agents, elemental sulfur crystallizes in its most stable allotropic (polymorphic) crystal phase at room temperature. With the addition of some modifying agents, elemental sulfur forms a copolymer (linear chains with styrene, cross-linking structure with DCPD) and remains plastic. (Note: In the natural rubber vulcanization process developed by Charles Goodyear, elemental sulfur is added to the material (extracted from rubber tree latex) heated to high temperatures to cross-link it (cross-linking with formation of disulfide bonds). In sulfur concrete, the opposite is true: a low-volatility organic liquid (dicyclopentadiene (DCPD), styrene, turpentine, or furfural...) is added to the molten sulfur to inhibit its crystallization and maintain a certain plasticity during its cooling/hardening. In both cases, cross-linking reactions take place between the sulfur and the organic molecules.)

Sulfur concrete then achieves high mechanical strength within ~ 24 hours of cooling. It does not require a prolonged curing period like conventional cement concrete, which after setting (a few hours) must still harden to reach its expected nominal strength at 28 days. The rate of hardening of sulfur concrete depends on its cooling rate and also on the nature and concentration of modifying agents (cross-linking process). Its hardening is governed by the fairly rapid liquid/solid state change and associated phase transition processes (the added modifiers maintaining the plastic state while avoiding its recrystallization). It is a thermoplastic material whose physical state depends on temperature. It can be recycled and reshaped in a reversible way, simply by remelting it at high temperature.

A sulfur concrete patent was already registered in 1900 by McKay. Sulfur concrete was studied in the 1920s and 1930s and received renewed interest in the 1970s because of the accumulation of large quantities of sulfur as a by-product of the hydrodesulfurization process of oil and gas production and its low cost.

== Characteristics ==
Sulfur concrete has a low porosity and is a poorly permeable material. Its low hydraulic conductivity slows down water ingress in its low porosity matrix and so decreases the transport of harmful chemical species, such as chloride (pitting corrosion), towards the steel reinforcements (physical protection of steel as long as no microcracks develop in the sulfur concrete matrix). It is resistant to some compounds like acids which attack normal concrete.

Beside its impermeability, Loov et al. (1974) also consider amongst the beneficial characteristics of sulfur concrete its low thermal and electrical conductivities. Sulfur concrete does not cause adverse reaction with glass (no alkali–silica reaction), does not produce efflorescences, and also presents a smooth surface finish. They also mention amongst its main limitations, its high coefficient of thermal expansion, the possible formation of acid under the action of water and sunlight. It also reacts with copper and produces a smell when melted.

== Uses ==
Sulfur concrete was developed and promoted as a building material to get rid of large amounts of stored sulfur produced by hydrodesulfurization of gas and oil (Claus process). As of 2011, sulfur concrete has only been used in small quantities when fast curing or acid resistance is necessary. The material has been suggested by researchers as a potential building material on Mars, where water and limestone are not easily available, but sulfur is.

== Advantages and benefits ==
More recently, it has been proposed as a near-carbon-neutral construction material. Its waterless and less energy-intensive production (in comparison with ordinary cement and regular concrete) makes it a potential alternative for high-CO_{2}-emission portland-cement-based materials. Due to improvements in fabrication techniques, it can be produced in high quality and large quantities. Recyclable sulfur concrete sleepers are used in Belgium for the railways infrastructure, and are mass-produced locally. THIOTUBE is the brand name for certified acid-resistant DWF (dry weather flow) discharge pipes used in Belgium.

== Long-term scientific and technical challenges ==
Sulfate-reducing bacteria (SRB) and sulfur-oxidizing bacteria (SOB) produce hydrogen sulfide (H_{2}S) and sulfuric acid (H_{2}SO_{4}) respectively. When the sulfur cycle is active in sewers and H_{2}S emanations from the effluent waters are oxidized in H_{2}SO_{4} by atmospheric oxygen at the moist surface of tunnel walls, sulfuric acid can attack the hydrated Portland cement paste of cementitious materials, especially in the non-totally immersed sections of sewers (non-completely water-filled vadose zone). It causes extensive damages to masonry mortar and concrete in older sewage infrastructures. Sulfur concrete, if proven resistant to long-term chemical and bacterial attacks, could provide an effective and long-lasting solution to this problem. However, since elemental sulfur itself participates in redox reactions used by some autotrophic bacteria to produce the energy they need from the sulfur cycle, elemental sulfur could contribute directly fueling the bacterial activity. Biofilms adhering to the surface of sewer walls could harbor autotrophic microbial colonies that can degrade sulfur concrete if they are able to use elemental sulfur directly as an electron donor to reduce nitrate (autotrophic denitrification process), or sulfate, present in wastewater. Studies and real life tests have shown that only bio sulfur is accessible to these bacteria.

The very long-term durability of sulfur concrete also depends on physicochemical factors such as those controlling, among other things, the diffusion of modifying agents (if not completely chemically fixed) out of the elemental sulfur matrix and their leaching by water. The resulting changes in the physical properties of the material will determine its long-term mechanical strength and chemical behavior. The biodegradability of the organic admixtures (sulfur modifiers), or their resistance to microbial activity, and their possible biocidal properties (which may protect the sulfur concrete from microbial attack) are important aspects in assessing the durability of the material. This could also depend on the progressive recrystallization of elemental sulfur over time, or on the rate of plastic deformation of its structure modified by the different types of organic admixtures.

== Disadvantages and limitations ==
Swamy and Jurjees (1986) have pointed out the limitations of sulfur concrete. They questioned the stability and the long-term durability of sulfur concrete beams with steel reinforcement, especially for sulfur concrete modified with dicyclopentadiene and dipentene. Even when dry, modified concrete beams show strength loss with ageing. Ageing in a wet environment leads to softening of sulfur concrete and loss of strength. It causes structural damages in sulfur concrete beams leading to shear failures and cracking. Swamy and Jurjees (1986) also observed severe corrosion of steel reinforcements. They concluded that the stability of reinforced sulfur concrete beams can only be guaranteed when they are unmodified and kept dry.

Being based on the use of elemental sulfur (S^{0}, or S_{8}) as a binder, sulfur concrete applications are expected to suffer the same limitations as those of elemental sulfur which is not a really inert material, can burn, and is also known to be a potent corrosive agent.

In case of fire, this concrete is flammable and will generate toxic and corrosive fumes of sulfur dioxide (SO_{2}), and sulfur trioxide (SO_{3}), ultimately leading to the formation of sulfuric acid (H_{2}SO_{4}).

According to Maldonado-Zagal and Boden (1982), the hydrolysis of elemental sulfur (octa-atomic sulphur, S_{8}) in water is driven by its disproportionation into oxidised and reduced forms in the ratio H_{2}S/H_{2}SO_{4} = 3/1. Hydrogen sulfide (H_{2}S) causes sulfide stress cracking (SSC) and in contact with air is also easily oxidized into thiosulfate (S_{2}O^{2−}_{3}), responsible for pitting corrosion.

Like pyrite (FeS_{2}, iron(II) disulfide), in the presence of moisture, sulfur is also sensitive to oxidation by atmospheric oxygen and could ultimately produce sulfuric acid (H_{2}SO_{4}), sulfate (SO^{2−}_{4}), and intermediate chemical species such as thiosulfates (S_{2}O^{2−}_{3}), or tetrathionates (S_{4}O^{2−}_{6}), which are also strongly corrosive substances (pitting corrosion), as all the reduced species of sulfur. Therefore, long-term corrosion problems of steels and other metals (aluminium, copper...) need to be anticipated, and correctly addressed, before selecting sulfur concrete for specific applications.

The formation of sulfuric acid could also attack and dissolve limestone (CaCO_{3}) and concrete structures while also producing expansive gypsum (CaSO_{4}·2H_{2}O), aggravating the formation of cracks and fissures in these materials.

If the local physico-chemical conditions are conducive (sufficient space and water available for their growth), sulfur-oxidizing bacteria (microbial oxidation of sulfur) could also thrive at the expense of concrete sulfur and contribute to aggravate potential corrosion problems.

The degradation rate of elemental sulfur depends on its specific surface area. The degradation reactions are the fastest with sulfur dust, or crushed powder of sulfur, while intact compact blocks of sulfur concrete are expected to react more slowly. The service life of components made of sulfur concrete depends thus on the degradation kinetics of elemental sulfur exposed to atmospheric oxygen, moisture and microorganisms, on the density/concentration of microcracks in the material, and on the accessibility of the carbon-steel surface to the corrosive degradation products present in aqueous solution in case of macrocracks or technical voids exposed to water ingress. All these factors need to be taken into account when designing structures, systems and components (SSC) based on sulfur concrete, certainly if they are reinforced, or pre-stressed, with steel elements (rebar or tensioning cables respectively).

While the process of elemental sulfur oxidation will also lower the pH value, aggravating carbon steel corrosion, in contrast to ordinary Portland cement and classical concrete, fresh sulfur concrete does not contain alkali hydroxides (KOH, NaOH), nor calcium hydroxide (Ca(OH)_{2}), and therefore does not provide any buffering capacity to maintain a high pH passivating the steel surface. In other words, intact sulfur concrete does not chemically protect steel reinforcement bars (rebar) against corrosion. The corrosion of steel elements embedded into sulfur concrete will thus depends on water ingress through cracks and to their exposure to aggressive chemical species of sulfur dissolved in the seeping water. The presence of microorganisms fuelled by elemental sulfur could also play a role and accelerate the corrosion rate.

== See also ==
- Asphalt concrete, similar aggregate material using 'bitumen' as a binder
- Sulfur-based lunarcrete, a proposed lunar construction material
- Cenocell, a concrete material using fly ash cenospheres (hollow spheres) in place of cement
- Rubber vulcanisation and cross-linking made by disulfide bridges formed after the reaction of elemental sulfur with natural rubber terpenoids (polyisoprene) (process discovered by Charles Goodyear)
- Sulfur vulcanization, produced by the reaction of elemental sulfur with allyl groups (-CH=CH-CH_{2}-) of natural rubber (latex extracted from hevea) heated at elevated temperature
- Lavinite, another sulfur conglomeration material
