= Interpenetrating polymer network =

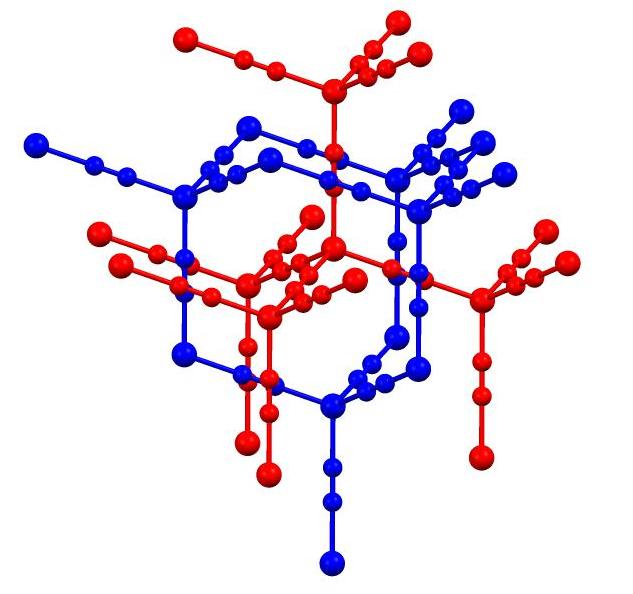
Structure of cadmium cyanide (Cd(CN)_{2}), highlighting the interpenetrated structure. Blue = one Cd(CN)_{2} substructure, red = other Cd(CN)_{2} substructure.

An Interpenetrating polymer network (IPN) is a polymer comprising two or more networks which are at least partially interlaced on a polymer scale but not covalently bonded to each other. The network cannot be separated unless chemical bonds are broken. The two or more networks can be envisioned to be entangled in such a way that they are concatenated and cannot be pulled apart, but not bonded to each other by any chemical bond.

IUPAC definition

Interpenetrating polymer network (IPN): A polymer comprising two
or more networks which are at least partially interlaced on a molecular scale
but not covalently bonded to each other and cannot be separated unless chemical
bonds are broken.

Note: A mixture of two or more pre-formed polymer networks is not an IPN.

Semi-interpenetrating polymer network (SIPN): A polymer comprising one or
more networks and one or more linear or branched polymer(s) characterized by the
penetration on a molecular scale of at least one of the networks by at least some
of the linear or branched macromolecules.

Note: Semi-interpenetrating polymer networks are distinguished from
interpenetrating polymer networks because the constituent linear or branched
polymers can, in principle, be separated from the constituent polymer network(s)
without breaking chemical bonds; they are polymer blends.

Sequential interpenetrating polymer network: Interpenetrating polymer network
prepared by a process in which the second component network is formed
following the formation of the first component network.

Sequential semi-interpenetrating polymer network: Semi-interpenetrating
polymer network prepared by a process in which the linear or branched
components are formed following the completion of the reactions that lead to
the formation of the network(s) or vice versa.

Simply mixing two or more polymers does not create an interpenetrating polymer network (polymer blend), nor does creating a polymer network out of more than one kind of monomers which are bonded to each other to form one network (heteropolymer or copolymer).

There are semi-interpenetrating polymer networks (SIPN) and pseudo-interpenetrating polymer networks.

To prepare IPNs and SIPNs, the different components are formed simultaneously or sequentially.

== History ==
The first known IPN was a combination of phenol-formaldehyde resin with vulcanized natural rubber made by Jonas Aylsworth in 1914. However, this was before Staudinger's hypothesis on macromolecules and thus the terms "polymer" or "IPN" were not yet used. The first usage of the term "interpenetrating polymer networks" was first introduced by J.R. Millar in 1960 while discussing networks of sulfonated and unsulfonated styrene–divinylbenzene copolymers.

== Mechanical Properties ==
IPNs exhibit unique mechanical properties that arise from the interlacing of two or more polymer networks, typically with differing chemical and physical characteristics. The entanglement and phase continuity of these networks–without covalent bonding between them–allows for synergistic enhancements in mechanical strength, elasticity, toughness, and resilience. These mechanical improvements are not typically observed in individual polymer networks or polymer blends without interpenetration.

Some key mechanical properties that IPNs can tune and enhance include tensile strength, stiffness, toughness, elongation at break, and damping. IPNs generally display enhanced tensile strength compared to their single-network counterparts. This is especially evident in double network hydrogels, which consist of a tightly crosslinked brittle first network and a loosely crosslinked ductile second network; systems with these contrasting network properties exhibit nonlinear increases in fracture stress and toughness. Elastic modulus, or the stiffness of the network, is influenced by the density and nature of the individual networks. For example, PEG/PAA IPNs show increased initial Young’s moduli under physiological buffer conditions due to the swelling-induced pre-stress and hydrogen bonding between networks. IPNs also often demonstrate high toughness through mechanisms such as energy dissipation via inter-network sliding or physical entanglement. In double network systems, toughness can exceed that of either constituent network by an order of magnitude due to crack deflection and distribution of stress across domains. Network composition in IPNs can be used to tune the material’s ability to stretch before failure, known as elongation at break. In some semi-IPN systems, elongation is enhanced by the mobility of the linear component, while full-IPN systems may trade off extensibility for strength. Finally, some IPN materials demonstrate excellent mechanical damping properties over a wide range of temperatures and frequencies due to broadened glass transition regions, an effect of the molecular intermixing.

A key consideration in the development of IPNs is establishing the impact of the many factors that influence the mechanical performance of these materials. For example, IPN mechanical properties highly depend on the crosslinking density of both networks. Higher crosslinking often increases modulus and strength but may reduce toughness or flexibility. In sequentially formed IPNs, controlling the crosslinker content in the second network has been shown to modulate overall mechanical behavior. Additionally, IPNs derive many of their mechanical advantages from a fine-scale interpenetrated morphology. When phase domains are smaller than ~20 nm, the materials may appear optically transparent and behave as homogeneous materials. The degree of phase separation is generally less in simultaneous IPNs than in sequential ones. Miscibility of the two polymers during IPN formation can significantly impact the morphology and mechanical properties of the networks. Incompatible systems may undergo phase separation, weakening inter-network adhesion; however, IPN synthesis can suppress large-scale phase separation even in incompatible blends, enabling synergistic mechanical effects. Finally, sequential and simultaneous polymerization methods produce different mechanical behaviors due to differences in how the networks interlock.

== Morphology ==
Most IPNs do not interpenetrate completely on a molecular scale, but rather form small dispersed or bicontinuous phase morphologies with characteristic length scales on the order of tens of nanometers. However, since these length scales are relatively small, they are often considered homogeneous on a macroscopic scale. The characteristic lengths associated with these domains often scale with the length of chains between crosslinks, and thus the morphology of the phases is often dictated by the crosslinking density of the constituent networks. The kinetics of phase separation in IPNs can arise from both nucleation and growth and spinodal decomposition mechanisms, with the former producing discrete phases akin to dispersed spheres and the latter forming bicontinuous phases akin to interconnected cylinders. Contrary to many typical phase separation processes, coarsening, where the length scale of the phases tends to increase over time, can be impeded by the formation of crosslinks in either network. Furthermore, IPNs are often able to maintain these complex morphologies over long periods of time compared to what could be achieved by simple polymer blends.

== Applications ==
IPNs have been used in automotive parts (including modern automotive paint), damping materials, medical devices, molding compounds, and in engineering plastics. While many benefits come from the enhanced mechanical properties of the IPN materials, other characteristics such as resistance to solvent swelling can also make IPNs a material of commercial interest. More recent applications and areas of research for IPNs include uses in drug delivery systems, energy storage materials, and tissue engineering.
