= Dispersion (materials science) =

In materials science, dispersion is the fraction of atoms of a material exposed to the surface. In general, D = N_{S}/N_{T}, where D is the dispersion, N_{S} is the number of surface atoms and N_{T} is the total number of atoms of the material. It is an important concept in heterogeneous catalysis, since only atoms exposed to the surface can affect catalytic surface reactions. Dispersion increases strongly as crystallite size decreases, reflecting the increasing fraction of atoms located at the surface. Atomistic models of small clusters show that this fraction can decrease from 100% for a single atom to approximately 50% at a crystallite diameter of about nine atomic spacings, and to below 10% for particles larger than roughly one hundred atomic spacings.

== Relationship to particle size ==
Dispersion is closely related to particle size through geometric relationships. For idealized spherical particles, the number of surface atoms $N_S$ scales with the particle surface area ($\propto d^2$), while the total number of atoms $N_T$ scales with the particle volume ($\propto d^3$). As a result, the dispersion $D = N_S/N_T$ is inversely proportional to the particle diameter:

$D \propto \frac{1}{d}$

This reflects the general dependence of the surface-to-volume ratio on particle size. A more rigorous expression for spherical particles relates dispersion to the mean particle diameter $d$ as:

$D = \frac{6 (v_m / a_m)}{d}$

where $v_m$ is the atomic volume and $a_m$ is the surface area occupied by a surface atom.

Smaller particles therefore exhibit higher dispersion and a greater fraction of catalytically accessible surface atoms. For very small particles, however, simple geometric models become inaccurate and atomistic descriptions are required.

== Interfacial scaling ==
In supported catalysts, catalytic activity may depend not only on the dispersion of surface atoms but also on metal–support interfacial or edge sites. In such cases, a stronger dependence on particle size can arise.

For a fixed total mass of metal catalyst, the number of particles scales inversely with particle volume:

$N_{\text{particles}} \propto \frac{1}{d^3}$

If the relevant active sites are associated with the boundary between the metal particle and the support, the characteristic interfacial length per particle scales with particle diameter:

$L_{\text{boundary}} \propto d$

The total density of such interfacial sites therefore scales as:

$L_{\text{total}} \propto \frac{1}{d^3} \cdot d = \frac{1}{d^2}$

This $1/d^2$ dependence can arise in models of edge- or interface-controlled catalytic processes.

== See also ==
- Emulsion dispersion
