= Lavinite =

Mixture of metal particles and sand

Lavinite (Polish: Lawinit) is a mixture of metal particles (usually iron) and sand held together by solidified molten sulfur. Instead of metal particles, magnesite could be used to give a whiter product. The idea was to make a material that looks like marble.

It was invented c. 1912 by Willy Henker, who in that year opened the factory "Kunststein-Industrie W. Henker & Co" in Berlin, which was in operation until at least 1936. Henker produced decorative items from lavinite such as vases, candlesticks, lamps, chandeliers and rosettes as well as letters and advertising signs.

Lavinite products were usually black, less often white or colored, enameled or covered with "antique" bronze. Initially, the factory offered items in the Art Nouveau style. Later they introduced lines in antique, oriental and Art Deco styles.

In 1922, Kunststein-Industrie W. Henker & Co opened a sales office in New York City and lavinite became very popular in the United States. Afterwards, Henker sold the patent for lavinite production to the U.S., France, Austria and Poland. In 1923 the factory "Lavinit. Krupka I Perlicz" opened in Włocławek, Poland, where it operated until 1939. They offered products from Willy Henker's factory catalogue. Over time, the assortment was expanded by items referring to the history of Poland, such as busts of Prince Józef Poniatowski or Adam Mickiewicz. For a short time, lavinite items were also produced by the Wulkanit factory in Grudziądz.

Currently, decorative items in lavinite are popular and valued at auctions all around the world. The biggest collection of them, comprising 63 items, is in the Muzeum Ziemi Kujawskiej i Dobrzyńskiej in Włocławek.

== See also ==
- Sulfur concrete
