= Corium (nuclear reactor) =

Material in core during nuclear meltdown

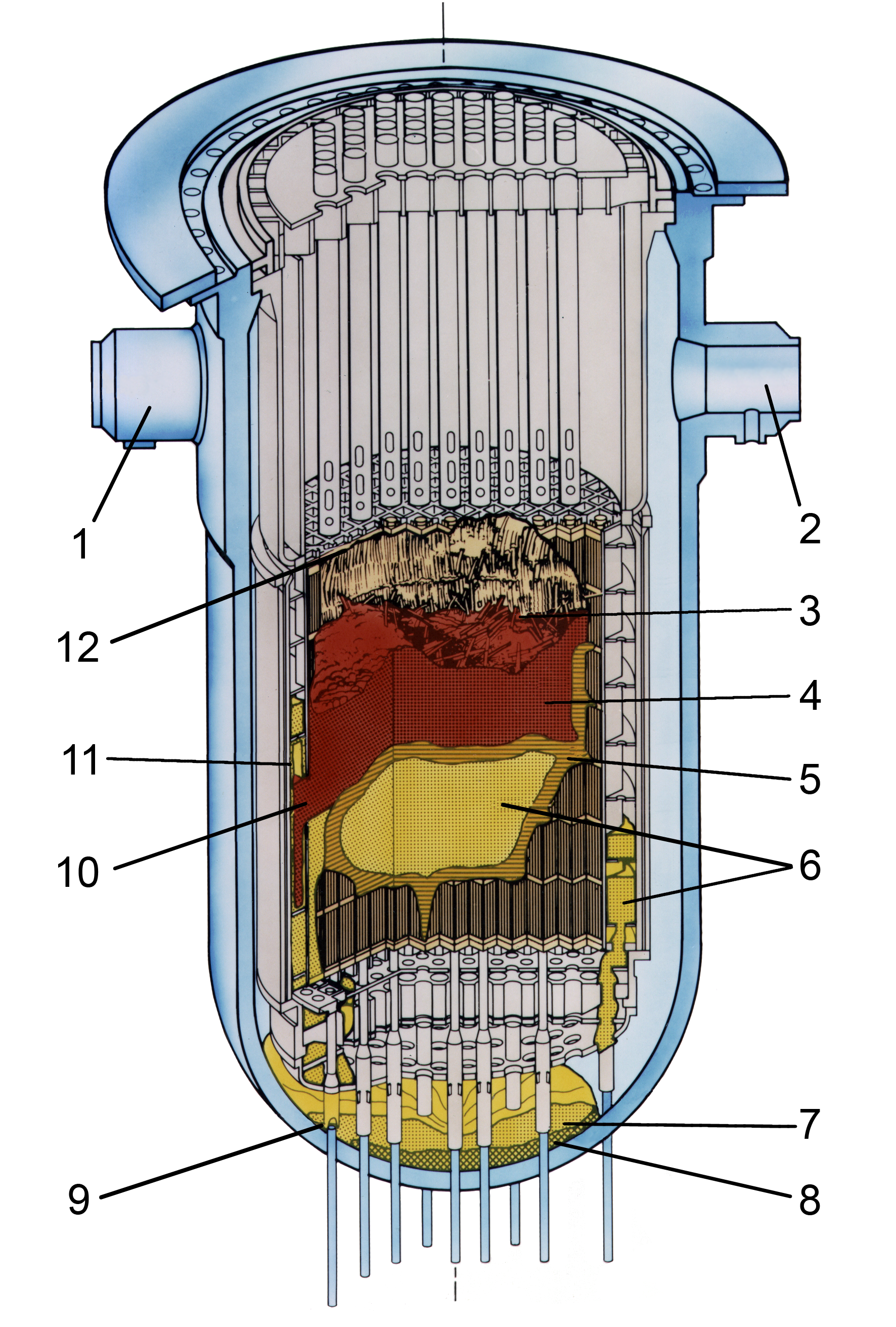
The Three Mile Island reactor 2 after the partial meltdown.: 1. Inlet 2B; 2. Inlet 1A; 3. Cavity; 4. Loose core debris; 5. Crust; 6. Previously molten material; 7. Lower plenum debris; 8. Possible region depleted in uranium; 9. Ablated incore instrument guide; 10. Hole in baffle plate; 11. Coating of previously molten material on bypass region interior surfaces; 12. Upper grid damaged top plate

Corium, also called fuel-containing material (FCM) or lava-like fuel-containing material (LFCM), is a material that is created in a nuclear reactor core during a nuclear meltdown accident. Resembling lava in consistency, it consists of a mixture of nuclear fuel, fission products, control rods, structural materials from the affected parts of the reactor, products of their chemical reaction with air, water, steam, and in the event that the reactor vessel is breached, molten concrete from the floor of the reactor room.

== Composition and formation ==
The heat causing the melting of a reactor may originate from the nuclear chain reaction, but more commonly decay heat of the fission products contained in the fuel rods is the primary heat source. The heat production from radioactive decay drops quickly, as the short half-life isotopes provide most of the heat and radioactive decay, with the curve of decay heat being a sum of the decay curves of numerous isotopes of elements decaying at different exponential half-life rates. A significant additional heat source can be the chemical reaction of hot metals with oxygen or steam.

Hypothetically, the temperature of corium depends on its internal heat generation dynamics: the quantities and types of isotopes producing decay heat, dilution by other molten materials, heat losses modified by the corium physical configuration, and heat losses to the environment. An accumulated mass of corium will lose less heat than a thinly spread layer. Corium of sufficient temperature can melt concrete. A solidified mass of corium can remelt if its heat losses drop, by being covered with heat insulating debris, or if water that is cooling the corium evaporates.

Crust can form on the corium mass, acting as a thermal insulator and hindering thermal losses. Heat distribution throughout the corium mass is influenced by different thermal conductivity between the molten oxides and metals. Convection in the liquid phase significantly increases heat transfer.

The molten reactor core releases volatile elements and compounds. These may be gas phase, such as molecular iodine or noble gases, or condensed aerosol particles after leaving the high temperature region. A high proportion of aerosol particles originates from the reactor control rod materials. The gaseous compounds may be adsorbed on the surface of the aerosol particles.

=== Composition and reactions ===
The composition of corium depends on the design type of the reactor, and specifically on the materials used in the control rods, coolant and reactor vessel structural materials. There are differences between pressurized water reactor (PWR) and boiling water reactor (BWR) coriums.

In contact with water, hot boron carbide from BWR reactor control rods forms first boron oxide and methane, then boric acid. Boron may also continue to contribute to reactions by the boric acid in an emergency coolant.

Zirconium from zircaloy, together with other metals, reacts with water and produces zirconium dioxide and hydrogen. The production of hydrogen is a major danger in reactor accidents. The balance between oxidizing and reducing chemical environments and the proportion of water and hydrogen influences the formation of chemical compounds. Variations in the volatility of core materials influence the ratio of released elements to unreleased elements. For instance, in an inert atmosphere, the silver-indium-cadmium alloy of control rods releases almost only cadmium. In the presence of water, the indium forms volatile indium(I) oxide and indium(I) hydroxide, which can evaporate and form an aerosol of indium(III) oxide. The indium oxidation is inhibited by a hydrogen-rich atmosphere, resulting in lower indium releases. Caesium and iodine from the fission products can react to produce volatile caesium iodide, which condenses as an aerosol.

During a meltdown, the temperature of the fuel rods increases and they can deform, in the case of zircaloy cladding, above 700–900 °C (1,292–1,652 °F). If the reactor pressure is low, the pressure inside the fuel rods ruptures the control rod cladding. High-pressure conditions push the cladding onto the fuel pellets, promoting formation of uranium dioxide–zirconium eutectic with a melting point of 1,200–1,400 °C (2,190–2,550 °F). An exothermic reaction occurs between steam and zirconium, which may produce enough heat to be self-sustaining without the contribution of decay heat from radioactivity. Hydrogen is released in an amount of about 0.5 m^{3} (18 cu ft) of hydrogen (at normal temperature/pressure) per kilogram of zircaloy oxidized. Hydrogen embrittlement may also occur in the reactor materials and volatile fission products can be released from damaged fuel rods. Between 1,300 and 1,500 °C (2,370 and 2,730 °F), the silver-indium-cadmium alloy of control rods melts, together with the evaporation of control rod cladding. At 1,800 °C (3,270 °F), the cladding oxides melt and begin to flow. At 2,700–2,800 °C (4,890–5,070 °F) the uranium oxide fuel rods melt and the reactor core structure and geometry collapses. This can occur at lower temperatures if a eutectic uranium oxide-zirconium composition is formed. At that point, the corium is virtually free of volatile constituents that are not chemically bound, resulting in correspondingly lower heat production (by about 25%) as the volatile isotopes relocate.

The temperature of corium can be as high as 2,400 °C (4,350 °F) in the first hours after the meltdown, potentially reaching over 2,800 °C (5,070 °F). A large amount of heat can be released by reaction of metals (particularly zirconium) in corium with water. Flooding of the corium mass with water, or the drop of molten corium mass into a water pool, may result in a temperature spike and production of large amounts of hydrogen, which can result in a pressure spike in the containment vessel. The steam explosion resulting from such sudden corium-water contact can disperse the materials and form projectiles that may damage the containment vessel by impact. Subsequent pressure spikes can be caused by combustion of the released hydrogen. Detonation risks can be reduced by the use of catalytic hydrogen recombiners.

Brief re-criticality (resumption of neutron-induced fission) in parts of the corium is a theoretical but remote possibility with commercial reactor fuel, due to low enrichment and the loss of moderator. This condition could be detected by presence of short life fission products long after the meltdown, in amounts that are too high to remain from the pre-meltdown reactor or be due to spontaneous fission of reactor-created actinides.

=== Reactor vessel breaching ===
Without adequate cooling, the materials inside of the reactor vessel overheat and deform as they undergo thermal expansion, and the reactor structure fails once the temperature reaches the melting point of its structural materials. The corium melt then accumulates at the bottom of the reactor vessel. In the case of adequate cooling of the corium, it can solidify and the damage is limited to the reactor itself. Corium may also melt through the reactor vessel and flow out or be ejected as a molten stream by the pressure inside the reactor vessel. The reactor vessel failure may be caused by heating of its vessel bottom by the corium, resulting first in creep failure and then in breach of the vessel. Cooling water from above the corium layer, in sufficient quantity, may obtain a thermal equilibrium below the metal creep temperature, without reactor vessel failure.

If the vessel is sufficiently cooled, a crust between the corium melt and the reactor wall can form. The layer of molten steel at the top of the oxide may create a zone of increased heat transfer to the reactor wall; this condition, known as "heat knife", increases the probability of formation of a localized weakening of the side of the reactor vessel and subsequent corium leak.

In the case of high pressure inside the reactor vessel, breaching of its bottom may result in high-pressure blowout of the corium mass. In the first phase, only the melt itself is ejected; later a depression may form in the center of the hole and gas is discharged together with the melt with a rapid decrease of pressure inside the reactor vessel; the high temperature of the melt also causes rapid erosion and enlargement of the vessel breach. If the hole is in the center of the bottom, nearly all corium can be ejected. A hole in the side of the vessel may lead to only partial ejection of corium, with a retained portion left inside the reactor vessel. Melt-through of the reactor vessel may take from a few tens of minutes to several hours.

After breaching the reactor vessel, the conditions in the reactor cavity below the core govern the subsequent production of gases. If water is present, steam and hydrogen are generated; dry concrete results in production of carbon dioxide and a smaller amount of steam.

=== Interactions with concrete ===
Thermal decomposition of concrete produces water vapor and carbon dioxide, which may further react with the metals in the melt, oxidizing the metals, and reducing the gases to hydrogen and carbon monoxide. The decomposition of the concrete and volatilization of its alkali components is an endothermic process. Aerosols released during this phase are primarily based on concrete-originating silicon compounds; otherwise volatile elements, for example, caesium, can be bound in nonvolatile insoluble silicates.

Several reactions occur between the concrete and the corium melt. Free and chemically bound water is released from the concrete as steam. Calcium carbonate is decomposed, producing carbon dioxide and calcium oxide. Water and carbon dioxide penetrate the corium mass, exothermically oxidizing the non-oxidized metals present in the corium and producing gaseous hydrogen and carbon monoxide; large amounts of hydrogen can be produced. The calcium oxide, silica, and silicates melt and are mixed into the corium. The oxide phase, in which the nonvolatile fission products are concentrated, can stabilize at temperatures of 1,300–1,500 °C (2,370–2,730 °F) for a considerable period of time. An eventually present layer of more dense molten metal can form an interface between the oxides and the concrete farther below, slowing down the corium penetration and solidifying within a few hours. The oxide layer produces heat primarily by decay heat, while the principal heat source in the metal layer is exothermic reaction with the water released from the concrete. Decomposition of concrete and volatilization of the alkali metal compounds consumes a substantial amount of heat.

The fast erosion phase of the concrete basemat lasts for about an hour and progresses to about one meter in depth, then slows to several centimeters per hour, and stops completely when the melt cools below the decomposition temperature of concrete (about 1,100 °C [2,010 °F]). Complete melt-through can occur in several days even through several meters of concrete; the corium then penetrates several meters into the underlying soil, spreads around, cools and solidifies.

During the interaction between corium and concrete, very high temperatures can be achieved. Less volatile aerosols of Ba, Ce, La, Sr, and other fission products are formed during this phase and introduced into the containment building at a time when most of the early aerosols are already deposited. Tellurium is released with the progress of zirconium telluride decomposition. Bubbles of gas flowing through the melt promote aerosol formation.

The thermal hydraulics of corium-concrete interactions (CCI, or also MCCI, "molten core-concrete interactions") is sufficiently understood. The dynamics of the movement of corium in and outside the reactor vessel is highly complex, however, and the number of possible scenarios is wide; slow drip of melt into an underlying water pool can result in complete quenching, while the fast contact of a large mass of corium with water may result in a destructive steam explosion. Corium may be completely retained by the reactor vessel, or the reactor floor or some of the instrument penetration holes can be melted through.

The thermal load of corium on the floor below the reactor vessel can be assessed by a grid of fiber optic sensors embedded in the concrete. Pure silica fibers are needed as they are more resistant to high radiation levels.

Some reactor building designs, for example, the EPR, incorporate dedicated corium spread areas (core catchers), where the melt can deposit without coming in contact with water and without excessive reaction with concrete. Only later, when a crust is formed on the melt, limited amounts of water can be introduced to cool the mass.

Materials based on titanium dioxide and neodymium(III) oxide seem to be more resistant to corium than concrete.

Deposition of corium on the containment vessel inner surface, e.g. by high-pressure ejection from the reactor pressure vessel, can cause containment failure by direct containment heating (DCH).

== Specific incidents ==
=== Three Mile Island accident ===
During the Three Mile Island accident, a slow partial meltdown of the reactor core occurred. About 41,900 pounds (19,000 kg) of material melted and relocated in about 2 minutes, approximately 224 minutes after the reactor scram. A pool of corium formed at the bottom of the reactor vessel, but the reactor vessel was not breached. The layer of solidified corium ranged in thickness from 5 to 45 cm.

Samples were obtained from the reactor. Two masses of corium were found, one within the fuel assembly, one on the lower head of the reactor vessel. The samples were generally dull grey, with some yellow areas.

The mass was found to be homogeneous, primarily composed of molten fuel and cladding. The elemental constitution was about 70 wt.% uranium, 13.75 wt.% zirconium, 13 wt.% oxygen, with the balance being stainless steel and Inconel incorporated into the melt; the loose debris showed somewhat lower content of uranium (about 65 wt.%) and higher content of structural metals. The decay heat of corium at 224 minutes after scram was estimated to be 0.13 W/g, falling to 0.096 W/g at scram+600 minutes. Noble gases, caesium and iodine were absent, signifying their volatilization from the hot material. The samples were fully oxidized, signifying the presence of sufficient amounts of steam to oxidize all available zirconium.

Some samples contained a small amount of metallic melt (less than 0.5%), composed of silver and indium (from the control rods). A secondary phase composed of chromium(III) oxide was found in one of the samples. Some metallic inclusions contained silver but not indium, suggesting a sufficiently high temperature to cause volatilization of both cadmium and indium. Almost all metallic components, with the exception of silver, were fully oxidized; even silver was oxidized in some regions. The inclusion of iron and chromium rich regions probably originate from a molten nozzle that did not have enough time to be distributed through the melt.

The bulk density of the samples varied between 7.45 and 9.4 g/cm^{3} (the densities of UO_{2} and ZrO_{2} are 10.4 and 5.6 g/cm^{3}). The porosity of samples varied between 5.7% and 32%, averaging at 18±11%. Striated interconnected porosity was found in some samples, suggesting the corium was liquid for a sufficient time for formation of bubbles of steam or vaporized structural materials and their transport through the melt. A well-mixed (U,Zr)O_{2} solid solution indicates peak temperature of the melt between 2,600 and 2,850 °C (4,710 and 5,160 °F).

The microstructure of the solidified material shows two phases: (U,Zr)O_{2} and (Zr,U)O_{2}. The zirconium-rich phase was found around the pores and on the grain boundaries and contains some iron and chromium in the form of oxides. This phase segregation suggests slow gradual cooling instead of fast quenching, estimated by the phase separation type to be between 3–72 hours.

=== Chernobyl accident ===
The largest known amounts of corium were formed during the Chernobyl disaster. The molten mass of reactor core dripped under the reactor vessel and now is solidified in forms of stalactites, stalagmites, and lava flows; the best-known formation is the "Elephant's Foot", located under the bottom of the reactor in a Cable Corridor.

The corium was formed in three phases.

- The first phase lasted only several seconds, with temperatures locally exceeding 2,600 °C (4,710 °F), when a zirconium-uranium-oxide melt formed from no more than 30% of the core. Examination of a hot particle showed a formation of Zr-U-O and UO_{x}-Zr phases; the 0.9-mm-thick niobium zircaloy cladding formed successive layers of UO_{x}, UO_{x}+Zr, Zr-U-O, metallic Zr(O), and zirconium dioxide. These phases were found individually or together in the hot particles dispersed from the core.
- The second stage, lasting for six days, was characterized by interaction of the melt with silicate structural materials—sand, concrete, serpentinite. The molten mixture is enriched with silica and silicates.
- The third stage followed, when lamination of the fuel occurred and the melt broke through into the floors below and solidified there.

The Chernobyl corium is composed of the reactor uranium dioxide fuel, its zircaloy cladding, molten concrete, as well as other materials in and below the reactor, and decomposed and molten serpentinite packed around the reactor as its thermal insulation. Analysis has shown that the corium was heated to at most 2,255 °C (4,091 °F), and remained above 1,660 °C (3,020 °F) for at least 4 days.

The molten corium settled in the bottom of the reactor shaft, forming a layer of graphite debris on its top. Eight days after the meltdown the melt penetrated the lower biological shield and spread on the reactor room floor, releasing radionuclides. Further radioactivity was released when the melt came in contact with water.

Three different lavas are present in the sub reactor levels of the reactor building: black, brown and a porous ceramic. They are silicate glasses with inclusions of other materials present within them. The porous lava is brown lava that had dropped into water thus being cooled rapidly.

During radiolysis of the Pressure Suppression Pool water below the Chernobyl reactor, hydrogen peroxide was formed. The hypothesis that the pool water was partially converted to H_{2}O_{2} is confirmed by the identification of the white crystalline minerals studtite and metastudtite in the Chernobyl lavas, the only minerals that contain peroxide.

The coriums consist of a highly heterogeneous silicate glass matrix with inclusions. Distinct phases are present:

- uranium oxides, from the fuel pellets
- uranium oxides with zirconium (UO_{x}+Zr)
- Zr-U-O
- zirconium dioxide with uranium
- zirconium silicate with up to 10% of uranium as a solid solution, (Zr,U)SiO_{4}, called chernobylite
- uranium-containing glass, the glass matrix material itself; mainly a calcium aluminosilicate with small amount of magnesium oxide, sodium oxide, and zirconium dioxide
- metal, present as solidified layers and as spherical inclusions of Fe-Ni-Cr alloy in the glass phase

Five types of material can be identified in Chernobyl corium:

- Black ceramics, a glass-like coal-black material with a surface pitted with many cavities and pores. Usually located near the places where corium formed. Its two versions contain about 4–5 wt.% and about 7–8 wt.% of uranium.
- Brown ceramics, a glass-like brown material usually glossy but also dull. Usually located on a layer of a solidified molten metal. Contains many very small metal spheres. Contains 8–10 wt.% of uranium. Multicolored ceramics contain 6–7% of fuel.
- Slag-like granulated corium, slag-like irregular gray-magenta to dark-brown glassy granules with crust. Formed by prolonged contact of brown ceramics with water, located in large heaps in both levels of the Pressure Suppression Pool.
- Pumice, friable pumice-like gray-brown porous formations formed from molten brown corium foamed with steam when immersed in water. Located in the pressure suppression pool in large heaps near the sink openings, where they were carried by water flow as they were light enough to float.
- Metal, molten and solidified. Mostly located in the Steam Distribution Corridors on OTM +6.0. Also present as small spherical inclusions in all the oxide-based materials above. Does not contain fuel per se, but contains some metallic fission products, e.g. ruthenium-106.

The molten reactor core accumulated in room 305/2, until it reached the edges of the steam relief valves; then it migrated downward to the Steam Distribution Corridor 210/7 as part of the Great Vertical Flow and 210/6 as the Small Vertical Flow. It also broke or burned through into room 304/3 as part of the Great Horizontal Flow. The corium flowed from the reactor in three streams. Stream 1, the Large Vertical, was composed of brown lava and molten steel; steel formed a layer on the floor of the Steam Distribution Corridor 210/7, on the Level +6, with brown corium on its top. From this area, brown corium flowed through the Steam Distribution Channels into the Pressure Suppression Pool 012/15 on the Level +3 and Pool 012/7 Level 0, forming porous and slag-like formations there. Stream 2, the Small Vertical was composed of black lava, and entered the other side of the Steam Distribution Corridor in 210/6. Stream 3, the Great Horizontal Flow, also composed of black lavas, flowed to other areas under the reactor via burning through 2 meters (6.6ft) of concrete from the sub-reactor room 305/2 to 304/3. The well-known "Elephant's Foot" structure is composed of two metric tons of black lava, forming a multilayered structure similar to tree bark, located in the cable corridor 217/2. The material is dangerously radioactive and hard and strong, and using remote controlled systems was not possible due to high radiation interfering with electronics.

The Chernobyl melt was a silicate melt that contained inclusions of Zr/U phases, molten steel and high levels of uranium zirconium silicate ("chernobylite", a black and yellow technogenic mineral). The lava flow consists of more than one type of material—a brown lava and a porous ceramic material have been found. The uranium to zirconium ratio in different parts of the solid differs a lot, in the brown lava a uranium-rich phase with a U:Zr ratio of 19:3 to about 19:5 is found. The uranium-poor phase in the brown lava has a U:Zr ratio of about 1:10. It is possible from the examination of the Zr/U phases to determine the thermal history of the mixture. It can be shown that before the explosion, in part of the core the temperature was higher than 2,000 °C, while in some areas the temperature was over 2,400–2,600 °C (4,350–4,710 °F).

The composition of some of the corium samples is as follows:

Composition of some corium samples
Type	SiO_{2}	U_{3}O_{8}	MgO	Al_{2}O_{3}	PbO	Fe_{2}O_{3}
Slag	60	13	9	12	0	7
Glass	70	8	13	2	0.6	5
Pumice	61	11	12	7	0	4

==== Degradation of the lava ====
The corium undergoes degradation. The Elephant's Foot, hard and strong shortly after its formation, is now cracked enough that a cotton ball treated with glue can remove 1-2 centimeters of material. The structure's shape itself is changed as the material slides down and settles. The corium temperature is now just slightly different from ambient. The material is therefore subject to both day–night temperature cycling and weathering by water. The heterogeneous nature of corium and different thermal expansion coefficients of the components causes material deterioration with thermal cycling. Large amounts of residual stresses were introduced during solidification due to the uncontrolled cooling rate. The water, seeping into pores and microcracks, has frozen there. This is the same process that creates potholes on roads, accelerating cracking.

Corium (and also highly irradiated uranium fuel) has the property of spontaneous dust generation, or spontaneous self-sputtering of the surface. The alpha decay of isotopes inside the glassy structure causes Coulomb explosions, degrading the material and releasing submicron particles from its surface. The level of radioactivity is such that during 100 years, the lava's self irradiation (2×10^{16} α decays per gram and 2 to 5×10^{5} Gy of β or γ) will fall short of the level required to greatly change the properties of glass (10^{18} α decays per gram and 10^{8} to 10^{9} Gy of β or γ). Also the lava's rate of dissolution in water is very low (10^{−7} g·cm^{−2}·day^{−1}), suggesting that the lava is unlikely to dissolve in water.

It is unclear how long the ceramic form will retard the release of radioactivity. From 1997 to 2002, a series of papers were published that suggested that the self irradiation of the lava would convert all 1,200 tons into a submicrometre and mobile powder within a few weeks. But it has been reported that it is likely that the degradation of the lava is to be a slow and gradual process rather than a sudden rapid process. The same paper states that the loss of uranium from the wrecked reactor is only 10 kg (22 lb) per year. This low rate of uranium leaching suggests that the lava is resisting its environment. The paper also states that when the shelter is improved, the leaching rate of the lava will decrease.

Some of the surfaces of the lava flows have started to show new uranium minerals such as UO_{3}·2H_{2}O (eliantinite), (UO_{2})O_{2}·4H_{2}O (studtite), uranyl carbonate (rutherfordine), čejkaite (Na_{4}(UO_{2})(CO_{3})_{3}), and the unnamed compound Na_{3}U(CO_{3})_{2}·2H_{2}O. These are soluble in water, allowing mobilization and transport of uranium. They look like whitish yellow patches on the surface of the solidified corium. These secondary minerals show several hundred times lower concentration of plutonium and several times higher concentration of uranium than the lava itself.

=== Fukushima Daiichi ===
The March 11, 2011, Tōhoku earthquake and tsunami caused various nuclear accidents, the worst of which was the Fukushima Daiichi nuclear disaster. At an estimated eighty minutes after the tsunami strike, the temperatures inside Unit 1 of the Fukushima Daiichi Nuclear Power Plant reached over 2,300˚C, causing the fuel assembly structures, control rods and nuclear fuel to melt and form corium. (The physical nature of the damaged fuel has not been fully determined but it is assumed to have become molten). The reactor core isolation cooling system (RCIC) was successfully activated for Unit 3; the Unit 3 RCIC subsequently failed, however, and at about 09:00 on March 13, the nuclear fuel had melted into corium. Unit 2 retained RCIC functions slightly longer and corium is not believed to have started to pool on the reactor floor until around 18:00 on March 14. TEPCO believes the fuel assembly fell out of the pressure vessel to the floor of the primary containment vessel, and that it has found fuel debris on the floor of the primary containment vessel.

In September 2024, TEPCO started an attempt to extract three grams of Corium using a robotic arm. Previously, a robotic arm was developed and built to withstand the intense radiation. This took four to five years.
