= Peter Boyle (epidemiologist) =

British epidemiologist (1951–2022)

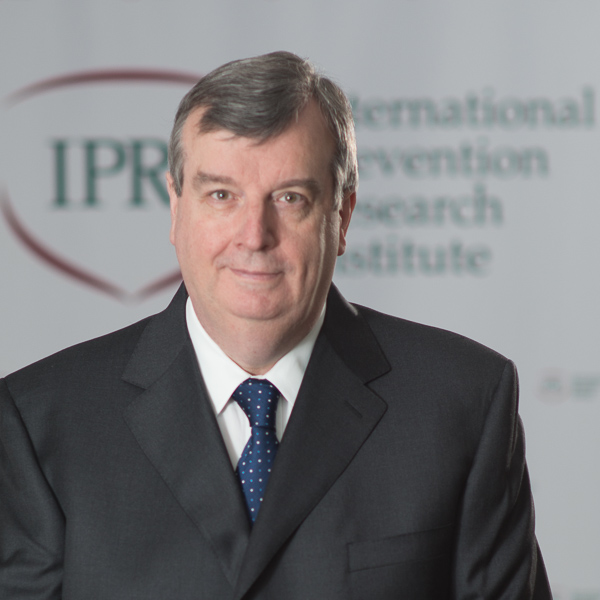
- Born: 8 June 1951; Glasgow, Scotland
- Died: 23 July 2022 (aged 71); Lyon, France
- Known for: Contribution to cancer epidemiology
- Awards: Knight's Cross of Order of Merit of Republic of Poland, 2000
- Scientific career
- Fields: Epidemiology
- Institutions: International Prevention Research Institute

Peter Boyle (8 June 1951 – 23 July 2022) was a British epidemiologist. He conducted research on globalisation of cancer, where he showed the dramatic increase of cancer in low- and medium income countries.

== Early life and education ==
Boyle was born in Glasgow, Scotland and studied statistics at the University of Glasgow (BSC in 1974) and received a Doctor of Philosophy degree in Epidemiology in 1985 from the University of Glasgow, Faculty of Medicine).

== Career ==
He initially wanted to become a teacher but became fascinated in science. From 1974 to 1977 he worked as a statistician at the University Department of Medicine, Glasgow and the following seven years at the West of Scotland Cancer Surveillance Unit in Glasgow. Here, he developed his lifelong concern over tobacco and tobacco control, and was drawn into epidemiology.

In 1984, he moved to Boston and worked at the Departments of Biostatistics and Epidemiology, Harvard School of Public Health and the Division of Biostatistics and Epidemiology, Dana–Farber Cancer Institute as Instructor and Assistant Professor. During this time Boyle coauthored his first two Lancet publications on cancer mortality in Scotland. In 1986, he returned to Europe and became Scientist at the International Agency for Research on Cancer, IARC, in Lyon, and Group Head of SEARCH (Surveillance of Environmental Aspects Related to Cancer in Humans.

In 1991, he moved to Milan, Italy to become the first chairperson of the Department of Epidemiology and Biostatistics and Director of the Division of Cancer Control of the European Institute of Oncology, EIO. During this time in 2003, the European Code against Cancer was developed and updated to its current third edition under the leadership of Boyle.

In 2003, he was elected the 4th Director of IARC and moved back to Lyon, a position he held from 2004 to 2008. He stood as a candidate for a second term as Director but was not successful.

In 2009, Boyle was the founding President of a new private research institute, named International Prevention Research Institute in Lyon, France.

Beside his main appointments he held several visiting and/or honorary professorships from different Universities, incl. University of Birmingham (1996–2022), University of Milan (1996–2004), University of Pittsburgh (1996–2002), University of Glasgow (1998–2022), University of Innsbruck (1998), University of Oxford (2003–2022).

== Personal life and death ==
Boyle was married and had three daughters (all of whom had distinguished themselves in medicine), two sons-in-law and three grandchildren. He joked that "the stream of strange foreign medical people arriving for dinner over the years was a clear risk factor in their career choices". He was very fond of Chinese restaurants and died on 23 July 2022 after a long illness in Lyon.

== Service ==
From 1995 to 2003 he was editor-in-chief (together with Carlo La Vecchia and Alec Walker) of the Journal of Epidemiology and Biostatistics and of the European Journal of Cancer from 1990 to 1994. Boyle was associate editor of Oncology and Haematology Literature Service from 1993 to 1998 and for the journals Annals of Oncology (1999-2022) and the British Journal of Urology International (2002-2022). Furthermore, he was a member of the editorial boards of the following Journals, Cancer Causes and Control (1990–1994), Swiss Journal of Social and Preventive Medicine (1990–2022), British Journal of Cancer (1990–1997), Prospectives (1990–99), BPH Observer (1990–99), The Breast (journal) (1991–97), Oral Oncology (1991–2022), European R and D Database (1993–98), Lung Cancer (1995–2022), Journal of Radiation Therapy (1996–2022), European Cancer News (1996–98), Journal of Gynecologic Oncology (1996–2022), Annals of Oncology (1996–2022), URO (Portuguese Journal of Urology) (1996–2022), Breast Cancer Online (1999–2022), Lancet (2003–2022), Nature Reviews Urology (2004–2022), Molecular Oncology (2006–2022).

== Scientific work ==
Boyle published more than 500 articles in scientific journals and co-authored some 23 books, including textbooks and cancer atlases. Boyle's specific field of investigation was prevention research. He contributed to the fields of tobacco and lung cancer, breast cancer and prostate cancer. Boyle was an internationally well-known cancer prevention advocate (European Code against Cancer, or The Globalisation of Cancer).

Boyle was member of many national and international scientific committees, including Secretary, Epidemiology and Prevention Branch, EORTC, Brussels (1986–92), Chairman, Epidemiology and Prevention Branch, European Society of Mastology (1989–1997), International Prostate Health Council (1989–2003), Scientific Advisory Board, European School of Oncology, Milan (1992–1999), Chairman, European Commission Expert Committee Cancer Plan (2000–2004), Chairman, Scientific Evaluation Committee, European Tobacco Fund, EC (1999–2002), CEO Advisory Committee, American Cancer Society (2002–2022), International Affairs Committee, American Association for Cancer Research (2003–2022), Multidisciplinary Oncology Committee, European Society for Medical Oncology (ESMO) (2006–2022), International Affairs Committee, American Society of Clinical Oncology (2008–2022).

== Awards and honors ==
Boyle received many awards, medals and was member of many scientific societies, among which are Honorary Member of the Argentine Medical Association (1996), Knight's Cross of Order of Merit of the Republic of Poland (2000), Fellow of Royal Society of Edinburgh (2000), Award from the President of Israel for Lifetime Contribution to Cancer Research, on Occasion of 50th Anniversary of Israel Cancer Association, Jerusalem (2002), Honorary Member, Hungarian Cancer Society (2003), Honorary Member, European Society for Therapeutic Radiology and Oncology (ESTRO) in 2003, Award of Honorary Doctor of Science by University of Aberdeen (2006) and Elected Fellow of Academy of Medical Sciences (2006), Elected Fellow of Royal College of Physicians of Edinburgh (2006), elected full member of ESMO (first non-medical oncologist elected to full membership) in 2006, Gold Award of the Health Promotion Foundation of Poland (2008), received the ESMO Lifetime Achievement Award (2014).
