= Effects of the Chernobyl disaster =

Assessment of Chernobyl's impact on Earth since 1986

The Chernobyl disaster of 1986 triggered the release of radioactive contamination into the atmosphere in the form of both particulate and gaseous radioisotopes. As of 2026 it remains the world's largest uncontrolled release of radioactivity into the natural environment.

The work of the Scientific Committee on Problems of the Environment (SCOPE) suggests that the Chernobyl disaster cannot be directly compared to atmospheric tests of nuclear weapons by simply saying that it is better or worse. This is partly because the isotopes released at the Chernobyl Nuclear Power Plant tended to be longer-lived than those released by the detonation of atomic bombs.

It is estimated that the Chernobyl disaster caused US$235 billion in economic damages.

== Radioactive release and dispersal ==
A map showing caesium-137 contamination in the Chernobyl area in 1996

Although it is difficult to compare the Chernobyl accident with a deliberate air burst nuclear detonation, it is estimated that Chernobyl released about 400 times more radioactive material than the combined atomic bombings of Hiroshima and Nagasaki. However, the Chernobyl disaster released only about one-hundredth to one-thousandth of the total radioactivity released during nuclear weapons testing at the height of the Cold War, due to varying isotope abundances.

The explosion at the power station and subsequent fires inside the remains of the reactor resulted in the development and dispersal of a radioactive cloud which drifted not only over Russia, Belarus, and Ukraine, but also over most of Europe and as far as Canada.

Following the explosion on April 26, 1986, the Chernobyl reactor continued releasing radioactive gases, aerosols, and fuel particles into the atmosphere for approximately 10 days. An estimated 14 exabecquerels (EBq) of radioactive material were released, with one exabecquerel representing ($10^{18}$) radioactive decays per second. These releases included iodine-131, cesium-137, strontium-90, and plutonium radioisotopes. Radioactive noble gases accounted for about half of the total radioactivity released.

Wind, particle size, and other atmospheric conditions played a major role in how radioactive particles spread after the Chernobyl disaster. Larger fuel particles generally settled within about 100 kilometers of the reactor, while the smaller particles remained in the air and were carried much farther by the wind. The area within 30 kilometers of the reactor was one of the most heavily contaminated areas. Rainfall caused radioactive particles in the air to fall to the ground, leading to higher contamination levels in areas that received more rain. This contributed to the uneven spread of contamination throughout Europe.

The initial evidence that a release of radioactive material had occurred came not from Soviet sources, but from Sweden, where on 28 April, two days after the disaster itself, workers at the Forsmark Nuclear Power Plant, approximately 1100 km from the Chernobyl site were found to have radioactive particles on their clothing. Sweden's elevated radioactivity levels, detected at noon on 28 April, were traced back to the western Soviet Union. Meanwhile, in Finland, the Finnish Meteorological Institute's measuring instruments located in Nurmijärvi detected rising radiation levels on 27 April, but a civil service strike delayed the response and publication.

Decades after the disaster, wildfires in the Chernobyl exclusion zone have caused the radioactive material that had previously settled on vegetation and soil to become airborne again. This process is known as radioactive resuspension. In April 2020, large wildfires burned through parts of the exclusion zone, releasing smoke and previously settled radioactive particles into the atmosphere. The smoke contained pollutants such as fine particulate matter ($PM_2_._5$), carbon monoxide, and black carbon. These wildfires led to very poor air quality, however, the study found that the levels of radioactive cesium-137 released posed no health risks to the surrounding areas.

=== Extent of ground contamination ===
According to reports from Soviet scientists, 28,000 square kilometers (km^{2}, or 10,800 square miles, mi^{2}) were contaminated by caesium-137 to levels greater than 185 kBq per square meter. 830,000 people lived in this area. About 10,500 km^{2} (4,000 mi^{2}) were contaminated by caesium-137 to levels greater than 555 kBq/m^{2}. Of this total, roughly 7,000 km^{2} (2,700 mi^{2}) lie in Belarus, 2,000 km^{2} (800 mi^{2}) in the Russian Federation and 1,500 km^{2} (580 mi^{2}) in Ukraine. About 250,000 people lived in this area. These reported data were corroborated by the International Chernobyl Project.

Areas of Europe contaminated with ^{137}Cs
Country	37–185 kBq/m^{2}		185–555 kBq/m^{2}		555–1,480 kBq/m^{2}		> 1,480 kBq/m^{2}	
Country	km^{2}	% of country	km^{2}	% of country	km^{2}	% of country	km^{2}	% of country
Belarus	29,900	14.4	10,200	4.9	4,200	2.0	2,200	1.1
Ukraine	37,200	6.2	3,200	0.53	900	0.15	600	0.1
Russia	49,800	0.3	5,700	0.03	2,100	0.01	300	0.002
Sweden	12,000	2.7	—	—	—	—	—	—
Finland	11,500	3.4	—	—	—	—	—	—
Austria	8,600	10.3	—	—	—	—	—	—
Norway	5,200	1.3	—	—	—	—	—	—
Bulgaria	4,800	4.3	—	—	—	—	—	—
Switzerland	1,300	3.1	—	—	—	—	—	—
Greece	1,200	0.9	—	—	—	—	—	—
Slovenia	300	1.5	—	—	—	—	—	—
Italy	300	0.1	—	—	—	—	—	—
Moldova	60	0.2	—	—	—	—	—	—
Totals	162,160 km^{2}		19,100 km^{2}		7,200 km^{2}		3,100 km^{2}	

Contamination from the Chernobyl accident was scattered irregularly depending on weather conditions, much of it deposited on mountainous regions such as the Alps, the Welsh mountains and the Scottish Highlands, where adiabatic cooling caused radioactive rainfall. The resulting patches of contamination were often highly localized, and localized water-flows contributed to large variations in radioactivity over small areas. Sweden and Norway also received heavy fallout when the contaminated air collided with a cold front, bringing rain. There was also groundwater contamination.

Rain was deliberately seeded over 10,000 square km of Belarus by the Soviet Air Force to remove radioactive particles from clouds heading toward highly populated areas. Heavy, black-coloured rain fell on the city of Gomel. Reports from Soviet and Western scientists indicate that the Belarusian SSR received about 60% of the contamination that fell on the former Soviet Union. However, the 2006 TORCH report stated that up to half of the volatile particles had actually landed outside the former USSR area currently making up Ukraine, Belarus, and Russia. An unconnected large area in Russian SFSR south of Bryansk was also contaminated, as were parts of northwestern Ukrainian SSR. Studies in surrounding countries indicate that more than one million people could have been affected by radiation. 2016 data from a long-term monitoring program showed a decrease in internal radiation exposure of the inhabitants of a region in Belarus close to Gomel.

In Western Europe, precautionary measures taken in response to the radiation included banning the importation of certain foods. A 2006 study found contamination was "relatively limited, diminishing from west to east", such that a hunter consuming 40 kilograms of contaminated wild boar in 1997 would be exposed to about one millisievert.

=== Relative isotopic abundances ===
The Chernobyl release was characterized by the physical and chemical properties of the radio-isotopes in the core. Particularly dangerous were the highly radioactive fission products, those with high nuclear decay rates that accumulate in the food chain, such as some of the isotopes of iodine, caesium and strontium. Iodine-131 was and caesium-137 remains the two most responsible for the radiation exposure received by the general population.

Contributions of the various isotopes to the atmospheric absorbed dose in the contaminated area of Pripyat, from soon after the accident to 27 years after the accident

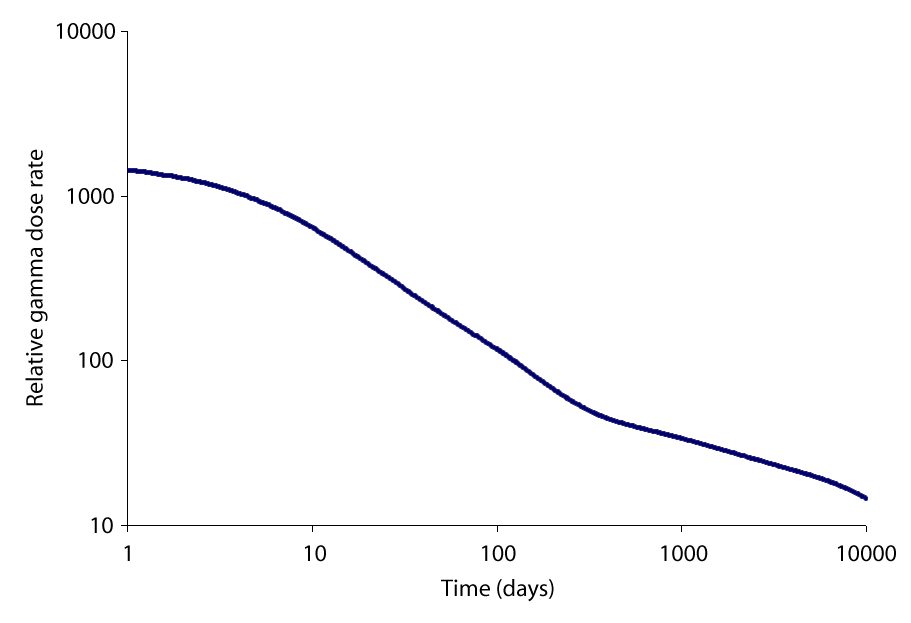
Logarithmic scaled graph of the external relative gamma dose for a person in the open near the disaster site. The dose that was calculated is the relative external gamma dose rate for a person standing in the open. The exact dose to a person in the real world requires a personnel-specific radiation dose reconstruction analysis and whole body count exams.

Soviet scientists reported that the Chernobyl Unit 4 reactor contained about 180–190 metric tons of uranium dioxide fuel and fission products. Estimates of the amount of this material that escaped range from 5 to 30%. Because of the heat of the fire, and with no containment building to stop it, part of the ejected fuel was vaporised or particulate and rose into the atmosphere, where it spread.

At different times after the accident, different isotopes were responsible for the majority of the external dose. The remaining quantity of any radioisotope, and therefore the activity of that isotope, after 7 decay half-lives have passed, is less than 1% of its initial magnitude, and it continues to decrease beyond 0.78% after 7 half-lives to 0.10% remaining after 10 half-lives have passed and so on. Some radionuclides have decay products that are likewise radioactive, which is not accounted for here. The release of radioisotopes from the nuclear fuel was largely controlled by their boiling points, and the majority of the radioactivity present in the core was retained in the reactor.

- All of the noble gases, including krypton and xenon, contained within the reactor were released immediately into the atmosphere by the first steam explosion. The atmospheric release of xenon-133, with a half-life of 5 days, is estimated at 5200 PBq.
- 50 to 60% of all core radioiodine in the reactor, about 1760 PBq (1760×10^{15} becquerels), or about 400 g, was released, as a mixture of sublimed vapour, solid particles, and organic iodine compounds. Iodine-131 has a half-life of 8 days.
- 20 to 40% of all core caesium-137 was released, 85 PBq in all. Caesium was released in aerosol form; caesium-137, along with isotopes of strontium, are the two primary elements preventing the Chernobyl exclusion zone being re-inhabited. 8.5×10^{16} Bq equals 24 kilograms of caesium-137. Cs-137 has a half-life of 30 years.
- Tellurium-132, half-life 78 hours, an estimated 1150 PBq was released.
- An early estimate for total nuclear fuel material released to the environment was 3±1.5%; this was later revised to 3.5±0.5%. This corresponds to the atmospheric emission of 6 tonnes of fragmented fuel.

== Environmental impact ==
=== Water bodies ===
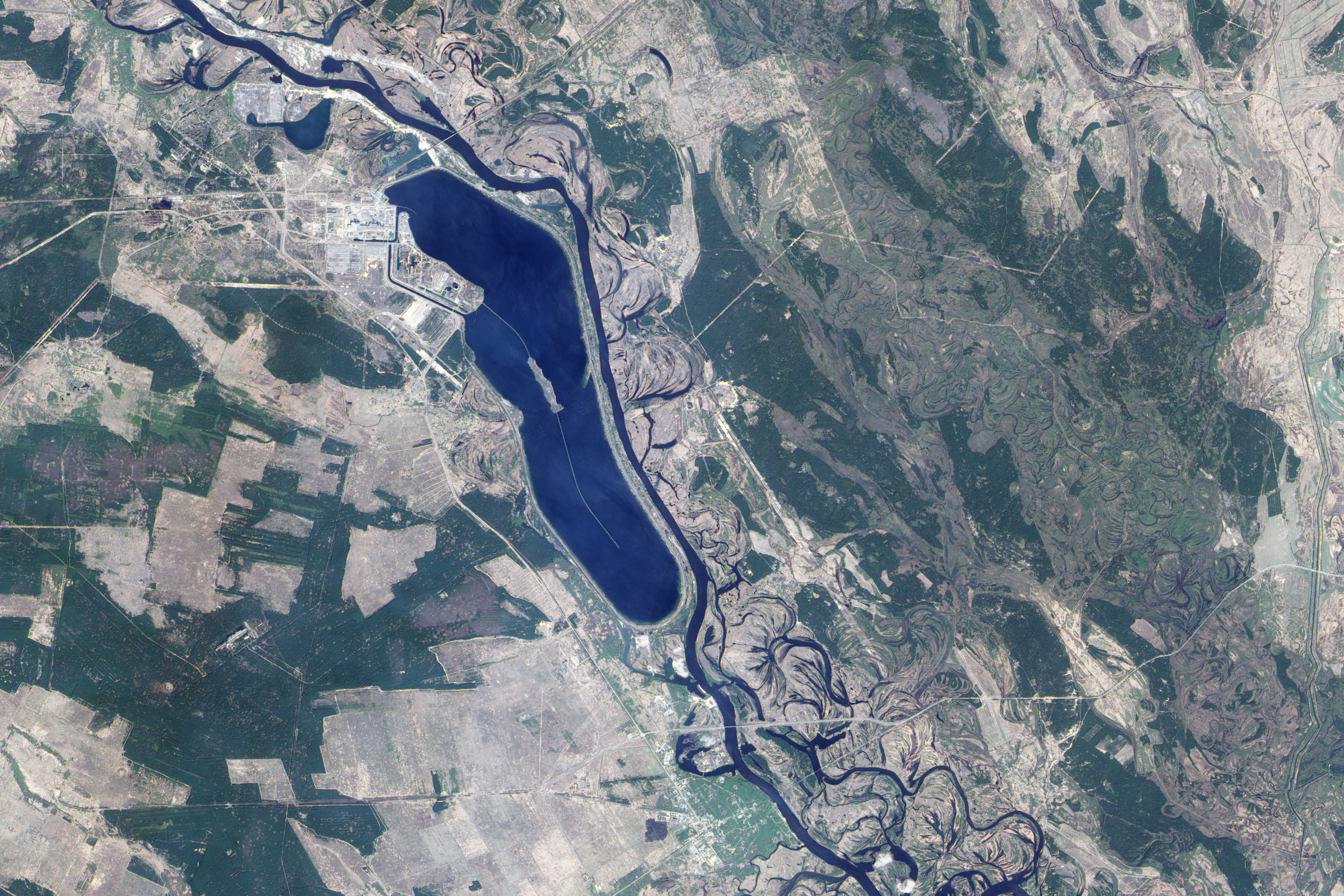
Reactor and surrounding area in April 2009

The Chernobyl nuclear power plant is located next to the Pripyat River, which feeds into the Dnieper reservoir system, one of the largest surface water systems in Europe, which at the time supplied water to Kiev's 2.4 million residents, and was still in spring flood when the accident occurred. The radioactive contamination of aquatic systems therefore became a major problem in the immediate aftermath.

In the most affected areas of Ukraine, levels of radioactivity in drinking water caused concern during the weeks and months after the accident. Guidelines for levels of radioiodine in drinking water were temporarily raised to 3,700 Bq/L, allowing most water to be reported as safe. Officially it was stated that all contaminants had settled to the bottom "in an insoluble phase" and would not dissolve for 800–1000 years. A year after the accident it was announced that even the water of the Chernobyl plant's cooling pond was within acceptable norms. Despite this, two months after the disaster the Kiev water supply was switched from the Dnieper to the Desna River. Meanwhile, massive silt traps were constructed, along with a 30 m deep underground barrier to prevent groundwater from the destroyed reactor entering the Pripyat River.

Groundwater was not badly affected by the Chernobyl accident since radionuclides with short half-lives decayed away long before they could affect groundwater supplies, and longer-lived radionuclides such as radiocaesium and radiostrontium were adsorbed to surface soils before they could transfer to groundwater. However, significant transfers of radionuclides to groundwater have occurred from waste disposal sites in the 30 km exclusion zone around Chernobyl. Although there is a potential for transfer of radionuclides from these disposal sites off-site, the IAEA Chernobyl Report argues that this is not significant in comparison to washout of surface-deposited radioactivity.

Radiation levels around Chernobyl in 1996

Bio-accumulation of radioactivity in fish resulted in concentrations significantly above guideline maximum levels for consumption. Guideline maximum levels for radiocaesium in fish vary but are approximately 1000 Bq/kg in the European Union. In the Kiev Reservoir in Ukraine, concentrations in fish were in the range of 3000 Bq/kg during the early years after the accident. In small "closed" lakes in Belarus and the Bryansk region of Russia, concentrations in a number of fish species varied from 100 to 60,000 Bq/kg during 1990–1992. The contamination of fish caused short-term concern in parts of the UK and Germany and in the long term in the affected areas of Ukraine, Belarus, and Russia as well as Scandinavia.

=== Plant and animal health ===
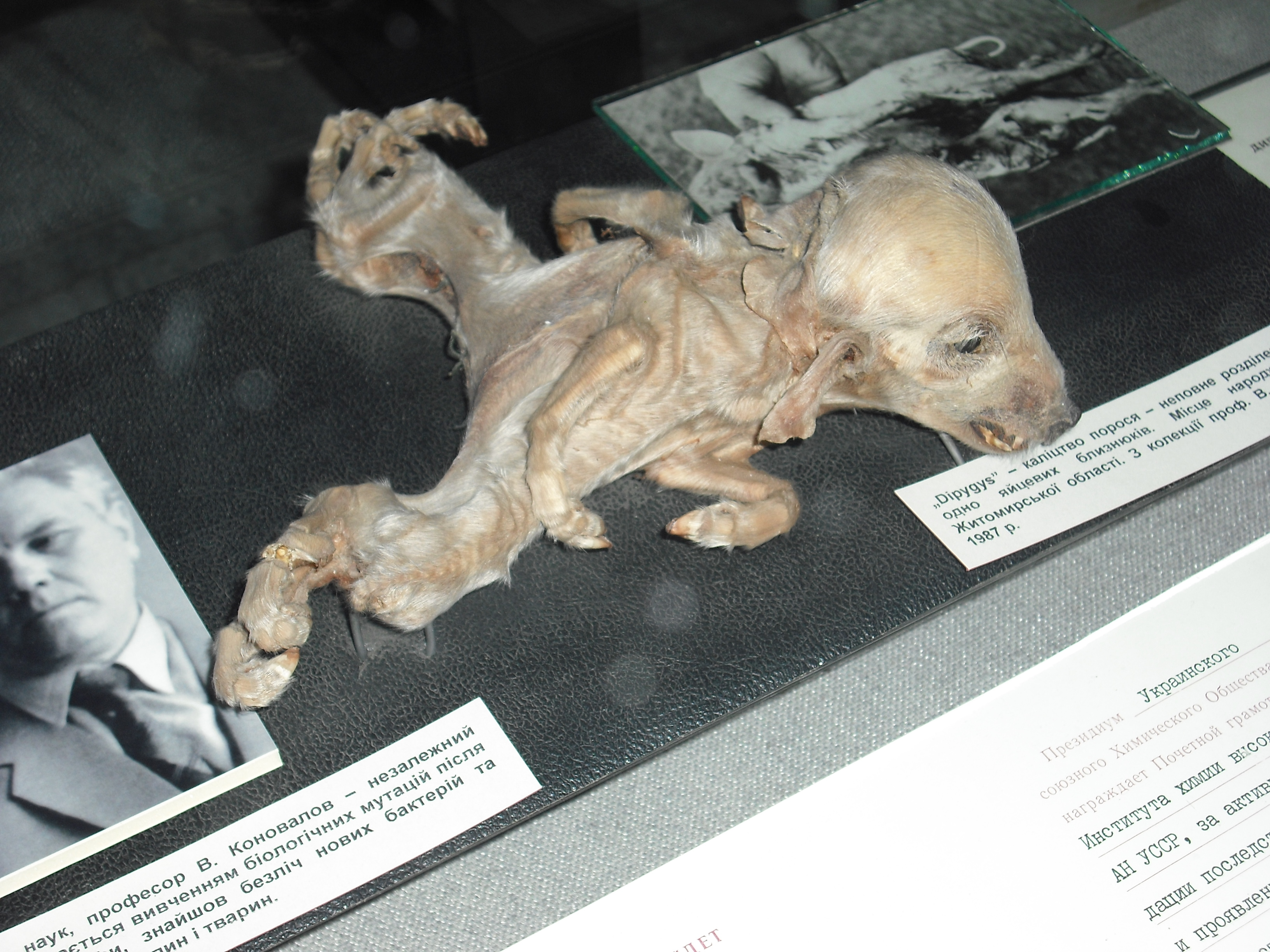
Piglet with dipygus on exhibit at the Ukrainian National Chernobyl Museum

The mutation rates for plants and animals have increased by a factor of 20 because of the release of radionuclides from Chernobyl. There is evidence for elevated mortality rates and increased rates of reproductive failure in contaminated areas, consistent with the expected frequency of deaths due to mutations. The disaster has been described by lawyers, academics and journalists as an example of ecocide.

After the disaster, 4 square km of pine forest directly downwind of the reactor turned reddish-brown and died, earning the name "Red Forest". The dead pines were bulldozed and buried. Livestock were removed during the human evacuations. Elsewhere in Europe, levels of radioactivity were examined in various natural food stocks. In both Sweden and Finland, fish in deep freshwater lakes were banned for resale and landowners were advised not to consume certain types.

When the disaster first occurred, the health and reproductive ability of animals and plants were negatively affected for the first six months. Some animals in the worst-hit areas also died or stopped reproducing. Most domestic animals were removed from the exclusion zone, but horses left on an island in the Pripyat River 6 km from the power plant died when their thyroid glands were destroyed by radiation doses of 150–200 Sv. Some cattle on the same island died and those that survived were stunted. The next generation appeared to be normal. On farms in Narodychi Raion of Ukraine it is claimed that from 1986 to 1990 nearly 350 animals were born with gross deformities; in comparison, only three abnormal births had been registered in the five years prior.

Invertebrate populations (including bumblebees, butterflies, grasshoppers, dragonflies, and spiders) decreased. As of 2009, most radioactivity around Chernobyl was located in the top layer of soil, where many invertebrates live or lay their eggs.

Radionuclides migrate through either soil diffusion or transportation within the soil solution. The effects of ionizing radiation on plants and trees in particular depend on factors that include climatic conditions, the mechanism of radiation deposition, and the soil type. Altitude, soil disturbance, and biological activity are also factors that influence the amount of radioisotopes in soil. Radiated vegetation affects organisms further up the food chain. Upper-level trophic organisms may have received less contamination, due to their ability to be more mobile and feed from multiple areas. The amount of radioactive nuclides found to have been deposited into surrounding lakes has doubled the normal baseline radioactive. Most of the radionuclides in surrounding water areas were found in the sediments at the bottom of the lakes. There has been a high incidence of chromosomal changes in plant and animal aquatic organisms, and this generally has correlated with the contamination and resulting genetic instability. Most of the lakes and rivers surrounding the Chernobyl exclusion zone are still contaminated with radionuclides (and will be for many years to come) as the natural decontamination processes of nuclides with longer half-lives can take years.

Subsequent research on microorganisms, while limited, suggests that in the aftermath of the disaster, bacterial and viral specimens exposed to the radiation underwent rapid changes. Activations of soil micromycetes have been reported. A paper in 1998 reported the discovery of an Escherichia coli mutant that was hyper-resistant to a variety of DNA-damaging elements, including x-ray radiation, UV-C, and 4-nitroquinoline 1-oxide (4NQO).

Due to the bioaccumulation of caesium-137, some mushrooms as well as wild animals which eat them, e.g. wild boars hunted in Germany and deer in Austria, may have levels which are not considered safe for human consumption. Mandatory radioactivity testing of sheep in parts of the UK that graze on lands with contaminated peat was lifted in 2012. Cladosporium sphaerospermum, an extremophile species of fungus which has thrived in the Chernobyl contaminated area, has been investigated for the purpose of using the fungus' particular melanin to protect against high-radiation environments, particularly space travel. It remains under intensive study, being radioresistant to such an extent, and indeed using ionizing radiation, that it has reached the rooms inside the exploded reactor building.

While effects on the immediate physical health of individual animals within the affected area tended to be negative, population levels of animals in the affected areas began to increase following the evacuation of humans. In the 1996 BBC Horizon documentary 'Inside Chernobyl's Sarcophagus', birds are seen flying in and out of large holes in the structure itself. Other casual observations also reported an increase in biodiversity due to the reduced human presence.

Radiation exposure has caused genetic damage in plants and animals, but over time, some plant species and populations of insects, amphibians, and rodents have shown signs of being able to tolerate these conditions. For example, Eastern tree frogs in the area affected by the Chernobyl disaster have been found to have darker skin pigmentation. This darker pigmentation may help protect the frogs from radiation-induced oxidative damage. Some populations of Scots pine trees have also continued to show stable growth and reproduction despite the high exposure to radiation. Even with these possible adaptations, some species may still experience negative effects from radiation.

==== Human food chain ====
One of the mechanisms by which radionuclides were passed to humans was through the ingestion of milk from contaminated cows. Most of the rough grazing that the cows took part in contained plant species such as coarse grasses, sedges, rushes, and plants such as heather (also known as Calluna vulgaris). These plant species grow in soils that are high in organic matter, low in pH, and are often well hydrated, thus making the storage and intake of these radionuclides more feasible and efficient.

Shortly after the Chernobyl accident, high levels of radionuclides were found in the milk and were a direct result of contaminated feeding. Within two months of banning most of the milk that was being produced in the affected areas, officials had phased out the majority of the contaminated feed that was available to the cows and much of the contamination was isolated.

With radiocaesium binding less with humic acid, peaty soils than the known binding "fixation" that occurs on kaolinite-rich clay soils, many marshy areas of Ukraine had the highest soil to dairy-milk transfer coefficients, of soil activity in ~ 200 kBq/m^{2} to dairy milk activity in Bq/L, that had ever been reported, with the transfer, from initial land activity into milk activity, ranging from 0.3^{−2} to 20^{−2} times that which was on the soil.

In 1987, Soviet medical teams conducted some 16,000 whole-body count examinations on inhabitants in otherwise comparatively lightly contaminated regions with good prospects for recovery. This was to determine the effect of banning local food and using only food imports on the internal body burden of radionuclides in inhabitants. Concurrent agricultural countermeasures were used when cultivation did occur, to further reduce the soil to human transfer as much as possible. The expected highest body activity was in the first few years, where the unabated ingestion of local food resulted in the transfer of activity from soil to body. After the dissolution of the Soviet Union, the now reduced scale initiative to monitor human body activity in these regions of Ukraine, recorded a small and gradual half-decade-long rise in internal committed dose before returning to the previous trend of observing lower body counts each year. This momentary rise is hypothesized to be due to the cessation of the Soviet food imports together with many villagers returning to older dairy food cultivation practices and large increases in wild berry and mushroom foraging.

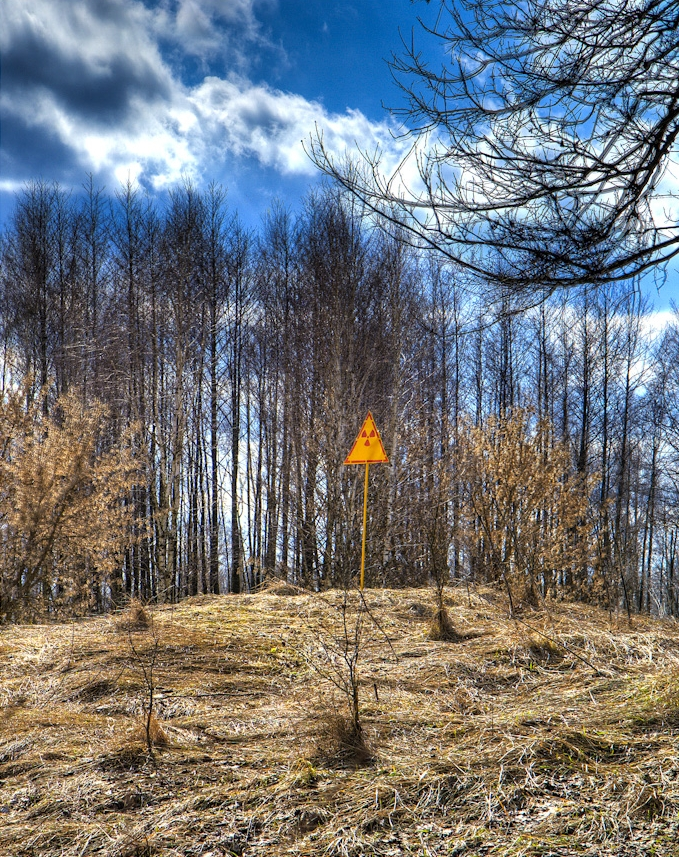
After the disaster, 4 square km of pine forest directly downwind of the reactor turned reddish-brown and died, earning the name of the "Red Forest", though it soon recovered. This photograph was taken years later, in March 2009, after the forest began to grow again, with the lack of foliage at the time of the photograph merely due to the local winter at the time.

In a 2007 paper, a robot sent into the no.4 reactor returned with samples of black, melanin-rich radiotrophic fungi that grow on the reactor's walls. In 2015, long-term empirical data showed no evidence of a negative influence of radiation on mammal abundance.

=== Precipitation on distant high ground ===
On high ground, such as mountain ranges, there is increased precipitation due to adiabatic cooling. This resulted in localized concentrations of contaminants in distant areas; higher in Bq/m^{2} values to many lowland areas much closer to the source of the plume.

The Norwegian Agricultural Authority reported that in 2009, a total of 18,000 livestock in Norway required uncontaminated feed for a period before slaughter, to ensure that their meat had an activity below the government permitted value of caesium per kilogram deemed suitable for human consumption. This contamination was due to residual radioactivity from Chernobyl in the mountain plants they grazed on in the wild during the summer. 1,914 sheep required uncontaminated feed for a time before slaughter during 2012, with these sheep located in only 18 of Norway's municipalities, a decrease from the 35 municipalities in 2011 and the 117 municipalities affected during 1986. The after-effects of Chernobyl on the mountain lamb industry in Norway were expected to be seen for a further 100 years, although the severity of the effects would decline over that period.

The United Kingdom restricted the movement of sheep from upland areas when radioactive caesium-137 fell across parts of Northern Ireland, Wales, Scotland, and northern England. In the immediate aftermath of the disaster, the movement of a total of 4,225,000 sheep was restricted across a total of 9,700 farms, to prevent contaminated meat entering the human food chain. The number of sheep and farms affected has decreased since 1986. Northern Ireland was released from all restrictions in 2000, and by 2009, 369 farms containing around 190,000 sheep remained under the restrictions in Wales, Cumbria, and northern Scotland. The restrictions applying in Scotland were lifted in 2010, while those applying to Wales and Cumbria were lifted during 2012, meaning no farms in the UK remain restricted because of Chernobyl. The legislation used to control sheep movement and compensate farmers was revoked in 2012.

=== Contested wildlife mutation research ===
The mutation rates among animals in the Chernobyl zone have been a topic of ongoing scientific debate, notably regarding the research conducted by Anders Moller and Timothy Mousseau. Their research, which suggests higher mutation rates among wildlife in the Chernobyl zone, has been met with criticism over the reproducibility of their findings and the methodologies used.

In 1996, geneticist Ronald Chesser and Robert Baker published a paper on the thriving vole population within the exclusion zone, in which the central conclusion was essentially that "The mutation rate in these animals is hundreds and probably thousands of times greater than normal". This claim occurred after they had done a comparison of the mitochondrial DNA of the "Chernobyl voles" with that of a control group of voles from outside the region. The authors discovered they had incorrectly classified the species of vole and were genetically comparing two different vole species. They issued a retraction in 1997.

== Human impact ==
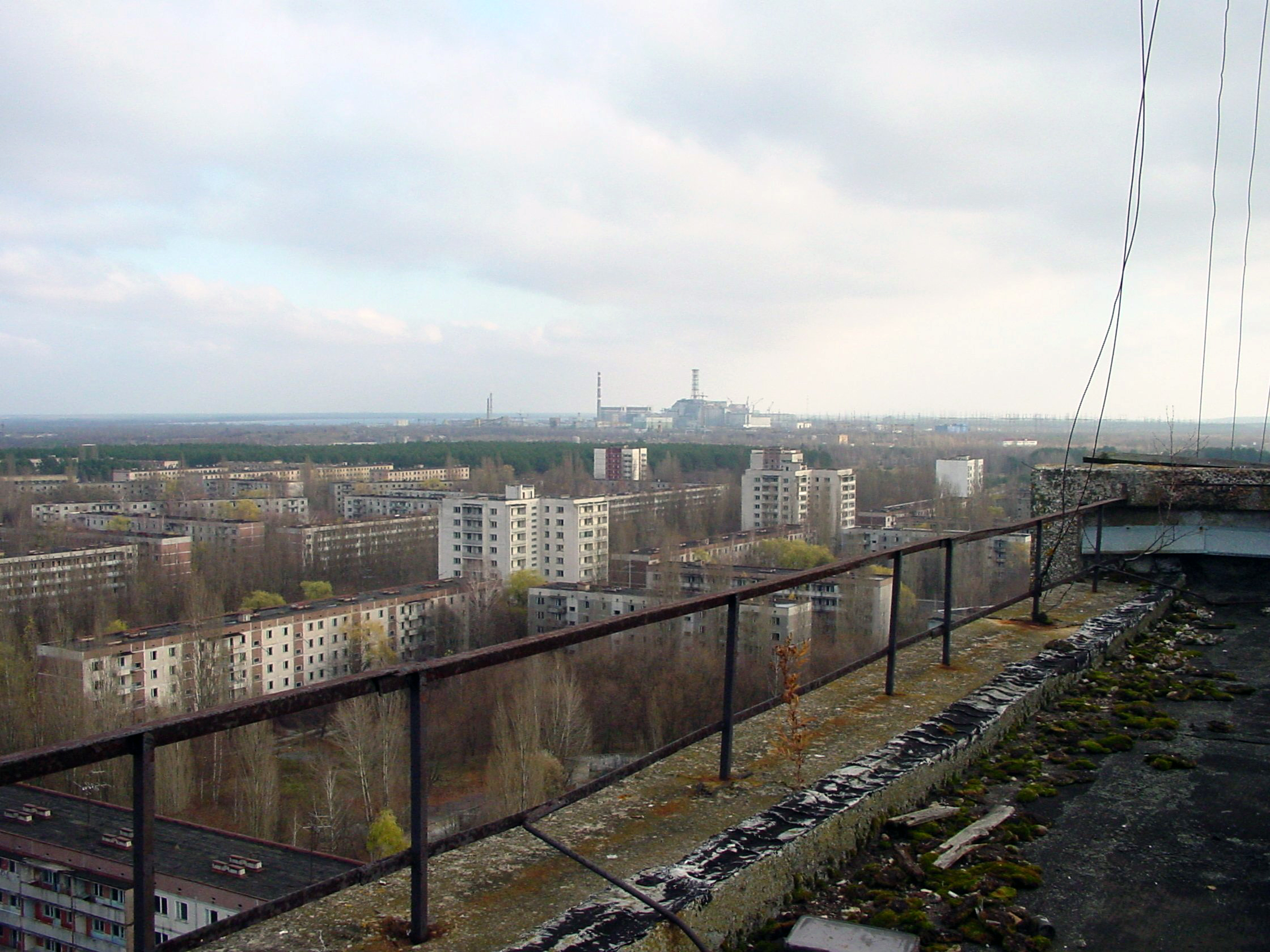
Pripyat lies abandoned with the Chernobyl facility visible in the distance.

=== Collective radiation dose ===
In a 2009 UNSCEAR study, the Chernobyl accident had by 2005 caused 61,200 man-Sv of radiation exposure to recovery workers and evacuees, 125,000 man-Sv to the populace of Ukraine, Belarus, and Russia, and 115,000 man-Sv to most other European countries combined; the report estimated a further 25% of exposure would be received from residual radioisotopes after 2005. UNSCEAR's earlier 1988 assessment put the global collective dose from Chernobyl at 600,000 man-Sv, "equivalent on average to 21 additional days of world exposure to natural background radiation." Doses were far higher among the roughly 530,000 recovery workers, who on average received an extra 50 years' worth of typical natural background radiation exposure.

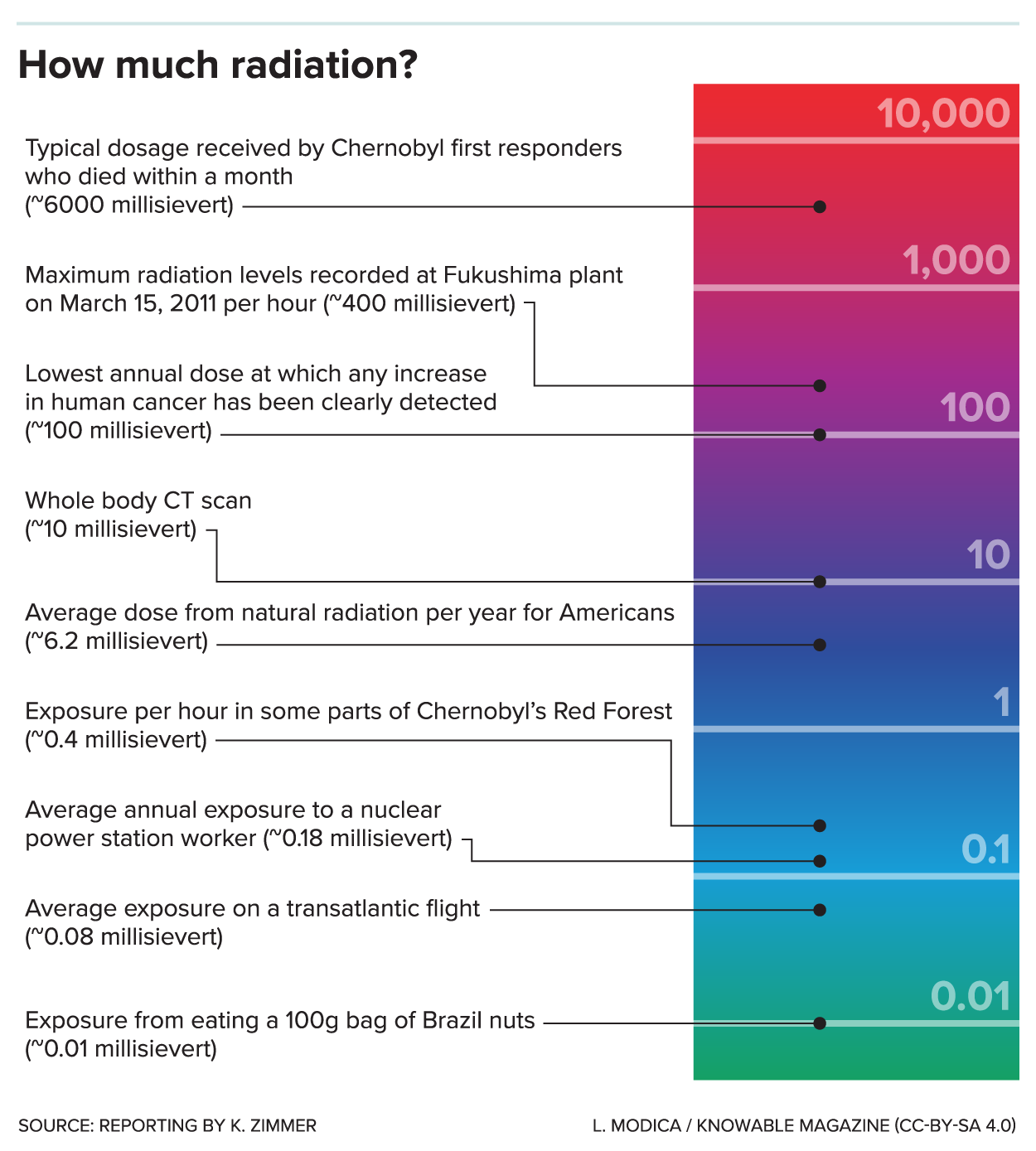
Radiation exposure to first responders at Chernobyl in comparison to a range of situations, from normal activities up to nuclear accident. Each step up the scale indicates a tenfold increase in radiation level.

=== Doses received by the public ===
The inhalation dose (internal dose) for the public during the time of the accident and their evacuation from the area in what is now the 30 km evacuation zone around the plant has been estimated, based on ground deposition of caesium-137, to be between 3 and 150 mSv.

Thyroid doses for adults around the Chernobyl area were estimated to be between 20 and 1000 mSv, whilst for one-year-old infants, these estimates were higher, at 20 to 6000 mSv. For those who left the area soon after the accident, the internal dose due to inhalation was 8 to 13 times higher than the external dose due to gamma/beta emitters. For those who remained until day 10 or later, the inhalation dose was 50-70% higher than the dose due to external exposure. The majority of the dose was due to iodine-131 (about 40%) and tellurium and rubidium isotopes (about 20 to 30% for Rb and Te).

The ingestion doses in this same group of people have also been estimated using the cesium activity per unit of area, isotope ratios, an average day of evacuation, intake rate of milk and green vegetables, and what is known about the transfer of radioactivity via plants and animals to humans. For adults, the estimated dose ranges from 3 to 180 mSv, while for one-year-old infants, the estimated dose ranges from 20 to 1300 mSv. Again, the majority of the dose was attributed to iodine-131.

=== How key radionuclides affect the body ===
The four most harmful radionuclides spread from Chernobyl were iodine-131, caesium-134, caesium-137 and strontium-90, with half-lives of 8 days, 2.07 years, 30.2 years and 28.8 years respectively. The iodine was initially viewed with less alarm than the other isotopes, because of its short half-life, but it is highly volatile and appears to have travelled furthest and caused the most severe health problems. Strontium is the least volatile and of main concern in areas near Chernobyl.

Iodine tends to become concentrated in the thyroid and milk glands, leading, among other things, to an increased incidence of thyroid cancers. The total ingested dose was largely from iodine and, unlike the other fission products, rapidly found its way from dairy farms to human ingestion. Similarly in dose reconstruction, for those evacuated at different times and from various towns, the inhalation dose was dominated by iodine (40%), along with airborne tellurium (20%) and oxides of rubidium (20%) both as equally secondary, appreciable contributors.

Long term hazards such as caesium tends to accumulate in vital organs such as the heart, while strontium accumulates in bones and may be a risk to bone-marrow and lymphocytes. Radiation is most damaging to cells that are actively dividing. In adult mammals cell division is slow, except in hair follicles, skin, bone marrow and the gastrointestinal tract, which is why vomiting and hair loss are common symptoms of acute radiation sickness.

=== Acute radiation sickness and immediate deaths ===
Estimated number of deaths from the Chernobyl nuclear disaster

The only known causal deaths from the accident involved plant workers and firefighters. The reactor explosion killed two engineers, and 28 others died within three months from acute radiation syndrome (ARS). Of 237 workers hospitalised, 134 showed symptoms of ARS. Some sources report a total initial fatality of 31, due to poorly substantiated reports of an individual who died during the evacuation of Pripyat from coronary thrombosis attributed to stress.

Most serious ARS cases were treated with the assistance of American specialist Robert Peter Gale, who supervised bone marrow transplant procedures, although these were unsuccessful. The fatalities were largely due to wearing dusty, soaked uniforms causing beta burns over large areas of skin, and due to bacterial infections of the gastrointestinal tract.

In the ten years following the accident, 14 more people who had been initially hospitalised died, mostly from causes unrelated to radiation exposure, with only two deaths resulting from myelodysplastic syndrome.

=== Workers and liquidators ===
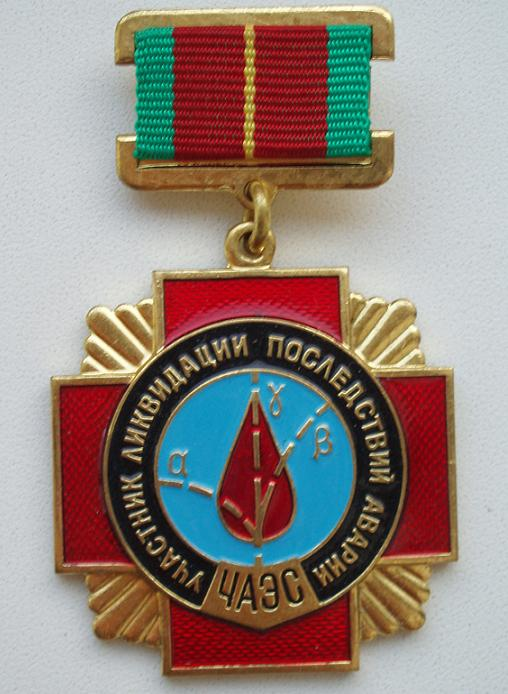
Soviet medal awarded to 600,000+ liquidators.

The workers involved in the recovery and clean-up after the disaster, called "liquidators", received high doses of radiation. In most cases, these workers were not equipped with individual dosimeters to measure the amount of radiation received, so experts could only estimate their doses, and dosimetric procedures varied enough that some workers are thought to have been given more accurate estimated doses than others. According to Soviet estimates, between 300,000 and 600,000 people were involved in the cleanup of the 30 km evacuation zone around the reactor, though many of them entered the zone two years after the disaster. Estimates of the number of liquidators vary; the World Health Organization, for example, puts the figure at about 600,000, while Russia lists as liquidators some people who did not work in contaminated areas. In the first year after the disaster, the number of cleanup workers in the zone was estimated to be 2,000; these workers received an estimated average dose of 165 millisieverts (16.5 REM).

Studies on genetic effects in the children of liquidators have reached varying conclusions. A 2001 study identified a sevenfold increase in DNA mutations in children of liquidators conceived after the accident, compared with siblings conceived beforehand, but a 2005 study of microsatellite mutations found no statistically significant increase in the frequency of germline mutations, nor an increase in developmental anomalies, among liquidators' children or among children living in other contaminated areas. A 2021 study using whole-genome sequencing of children of Chernobyl liquidators similarly found no evidence of trans-generational genetic effects.

=== Cancer cases ===
The Chernobyl Forum found no statistically significant increase in solid cancer incidence among rescue workers, though increased medical surveillance after the accident led to higher recorded rates of benign conditions and cancers generally. The IAEA states that there has been no increase in solid cancers or leukaemia beyond thyroid cancer, corroborating other UN assessments. Estimates of the eventual number of radiation-linked deaths across the wider population, beyond the roughly 30 confirmed acute fatalities, vary enormously by methodology and by the population studied, from official projections in the low thousands to disputed figures in the tens or hundreds of thousands; see § Estimating the human death toll below for the competing estimates and their methodologies.

==== Thyroid cancer ====
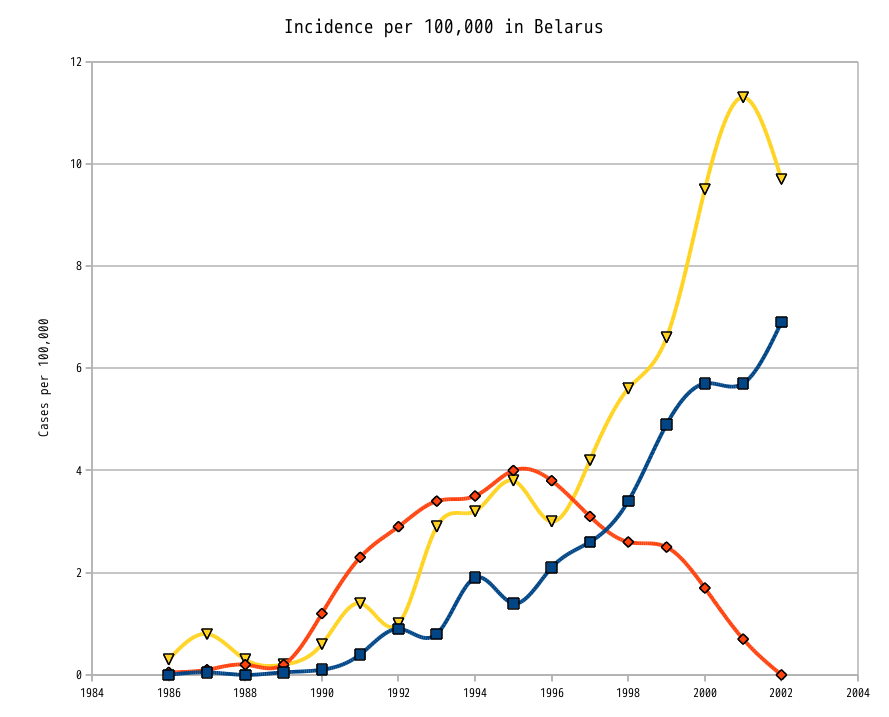
Thyroid cancer incidence in children and adolescents in Belarus Adults, ages 19 to 34 Adolescents, ages 15 to 18 Children, ages up to 14 While widely regarded as having a cause-and-effect relationship, the causality of Chernobyl with the increase in recorded rates of thyroid cancer is disputed.

In humans, ingestion of milk containing abnormally high levels of iodine radionuclides was the precursor for thyroid disease, especially in children and in the immunocompromised.

Iodine-131, though it has a short half-life compared with other radioactive isotopes released by the accident, made its way through the food chain via a milk-to-consumer pathway; an estimated 95% of ingested iodine-131 came from milk. Communities were largely unaware of the contamination deposited in soil and of how it transferred into other foods, and children absorbed much of their dose from drinking contaminated milk. Some children in the contaminated areas received thyroid doses of up to 50 gray, mostly from this pathway. Absorption in children has also been shown to be inversely proportional to age: children have smaller thyroid glands than adults and exhibit a different dose response after ingesting iodine-131, so the youngest children at the time of exposure received the highest doses. A 2013 cohort study of 12,000 people who were under 18 at the time of exposure in Belarus found a similar trend between age and dose response.

Before the accident, childhood thyroid cancer was rare, with an expected global incidence of about 0.1–2.2 cases per million children under 15 each year. Cases of paediatric thyroid cancer, overwhelmingly of the papillary type, began rising in Ukraine and Belarus three to four years after the accident; children were most at risk and adult incidence did not appear to rise, and the greatest increase was among those youngest at the time of exposure, with most cases reported in Gomel Oblast, Belarus, the area exposed to the highest contamination levels. Before the accident, the rate of thyroid cancer in Belarusian children was less than 1 per million; by 1995, nine years after the disaster, the rate in Gomel Oblast had risen to 1,000 per million per year.

Estimates of the total number of cases grew as follow-up continued and screening expanded. The IAEA at one point documented "1800 cases of thyroid cancer in children who were between 0 and 14 years of age when the disaster occurred", which it described as far higher than normal; the WHO linked nearly 700 cases among children and adolescents to the disaster by late 1995, with about 10 attributed deaths, while noting that the rapid rise in detected cases may partly reflect the screening process itself; the Chernobyl Forum reported more than 4,000 cases by 2004, and by 2005 UNSCEAR reported an excess of over 6,000 documented cases among those exposed as children or adolescents; and a 2006 study in the International Journal of Cancer estimated that Chernobyl had caused about 1,000 thyroid cancer cases in Europe by 2006, projecting a rise to about 16,000 cases by 2065, representing about 0.01% of all incident cancers since the accident against a background of several hundred million cancer cases expected from other causes over the same period. The German affiliate of the International Physicians for the Prevention of Nuclear War put the number affected at over 10,000 as of 2006, with 50,000 cases expected eventually.

The typical latency of radiation-induced thyroid cancer is about 10 years, though increases in some regions were observed as early as 1987. The cancers that have appeared are of an aggressive type but are highly treatable if detected early, with surgery followed by iodine-131 therapy for any metastases; well-differentiated thyroid cancers have a five-year survival rate of 96% and a 92% survival rate after 30 years, and treatment has been successful in the vast majority of cases. The WHO's Radiation Programme reported nine deaths among the roughly 4,000 documented cases as of the mid-2000s, and by 2011 UNSCEAR reported a cumulative total of 15 deaths from thyroid cancer. Despite these outcomes, several published studies maintain that the elevated thyroid cancer risk associated with Chernobyl remains high.

A group of experts affiliated with the Agenda for Research on Chernobyl Health (ARCH) has proposed further lifelong studies of the exposed population to clarify long-term risk and inform future radiation protection.

=== Congenital and reproductive effects ===
Despite spurious studies from Germany and Turkey, the only robust evidence of negative pregnancy outcomes that followed the accident was an increase in elective abortions across Europe, an "indirect effect" that researchers in Greece, Denmark, Italy, and elsewhere attributed to anxieties created by media coverage rather than to radiation itself. Journalists had encouraged public mistrust of medical professionals after the accident, and this framing is estimated to have led to about 150,000 elective abortions worldwide out of fear of radiation, including roughly 400 additional abortions in Denmark and an increase of 2,500 terminations in Greece despite low radiation doses.

No significant evidence of changes in the prevalence of congenital anomalies linked to the accident has been found in Belarus or Ukraine, and studies in Sweden and Finland found no association between the fallout and congenital malformations. Larger studies, such as the EUROCAT database, assessed nearly a million births across Europe and found no impact from Chernobyl, leading researchers to conclude that widespread fear about effects on unborn fetuses was not justified. The IAEA likewise states that there has been no increase in birth defects, corroborating other UN assessments.

Researchers at the time knew that high doses of radiation increase the rate of pregnancy and fetal abnormalities, but those familiar with both the existing human exposure data and animal testing knew that, unlike the linear no-threshold model used for cancer risk, malformation of organs is a deterministic effect with a threshold dose below which no rate increase is observed. Frank Castronovo of Harvard Medical School reviewed the available dose reconstructions and pregnancy data, including from Kyiv's two largest obstetrics hospitals, and concluded that lay-press coverage playing up anecdotal stories, together with studies flawed by selection bias, were the two primary factors behind the persistent belief that Chernobyl increased the background rate of birth defects; since no pregnant women took part in the most radioactive liquidator operations, none were exposed to the threshold dose.

Despite Castronovo's conclusions, other researchers have reported statistical anomalies consistent with a Chernobyl effect on specific conditions. Karl Sperling, Heidemarie Neitzel, and Hagen Scherb found that the prevalence of Down syndrome (trisomy 21) in West Berlin, Germany, peaked nine months after the main fallout: after a stable birth prevalence of 1.35–1.59 per 1,000 live births (27–31 cases) from 1980 to 1986, 46 cases were diagnosed in 1987 (2.11 per 1,000), with much of the increase concentrated in a cluster of 12 children born in January 1987; the prevalence fell back to pre-Chernobyl levels by 1989. Separately, an unusually high number of Down syndrome cases was reported in Belarus in January 1987, though no subsequent upward trend was observed there.

Studies in regions of Ukraine and Belarus suggest that around 50 children exposed in utero during weeks 8 to 25 of gestation may have experienced an increased rate of intellectual disability and lower verbal IQ. UNSCEAR has also noted the possibility of long-term genetic defects, citing a doubling of radiation-induced minisatellite mutations among children born in 1994. For genetic effects specifically in liquidators' children, see § Workers and liquidators above.

=== Psychological and social effects ===
Psychosomatic illness and post-traumatic stress, driven by widespread fear of radiological disease, have had a significant impact on the affected population, often exacerbating health issues by fostering fatalistic attitudes and harmful behaviours. By 2000, the number of Ukrainians claiming radiation-related "sufferer" status had reached 3.5 million, or 5% of the population, many of them resettled from contaminated zones or former Chernobyl workers. Fred Mettler, a radiation expert, noted that labelling the affected population as "victims" contributed to a sense of helplessness, and that even 20 years after the accident the population remained unsure about radiation's effects, leading to harmful behaviours.

== Economic impact to the Soviet Union ==
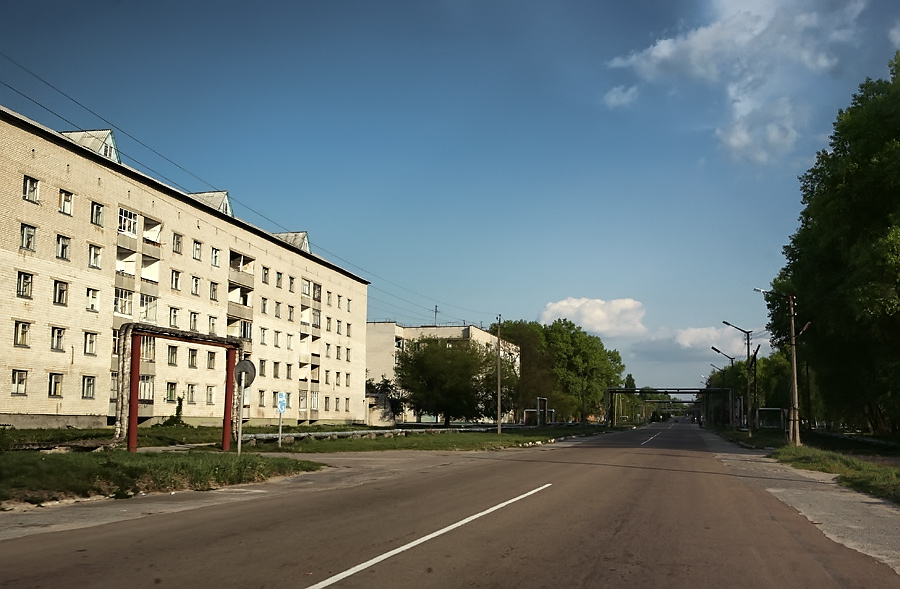
Abandoned buildings in Chernobyl

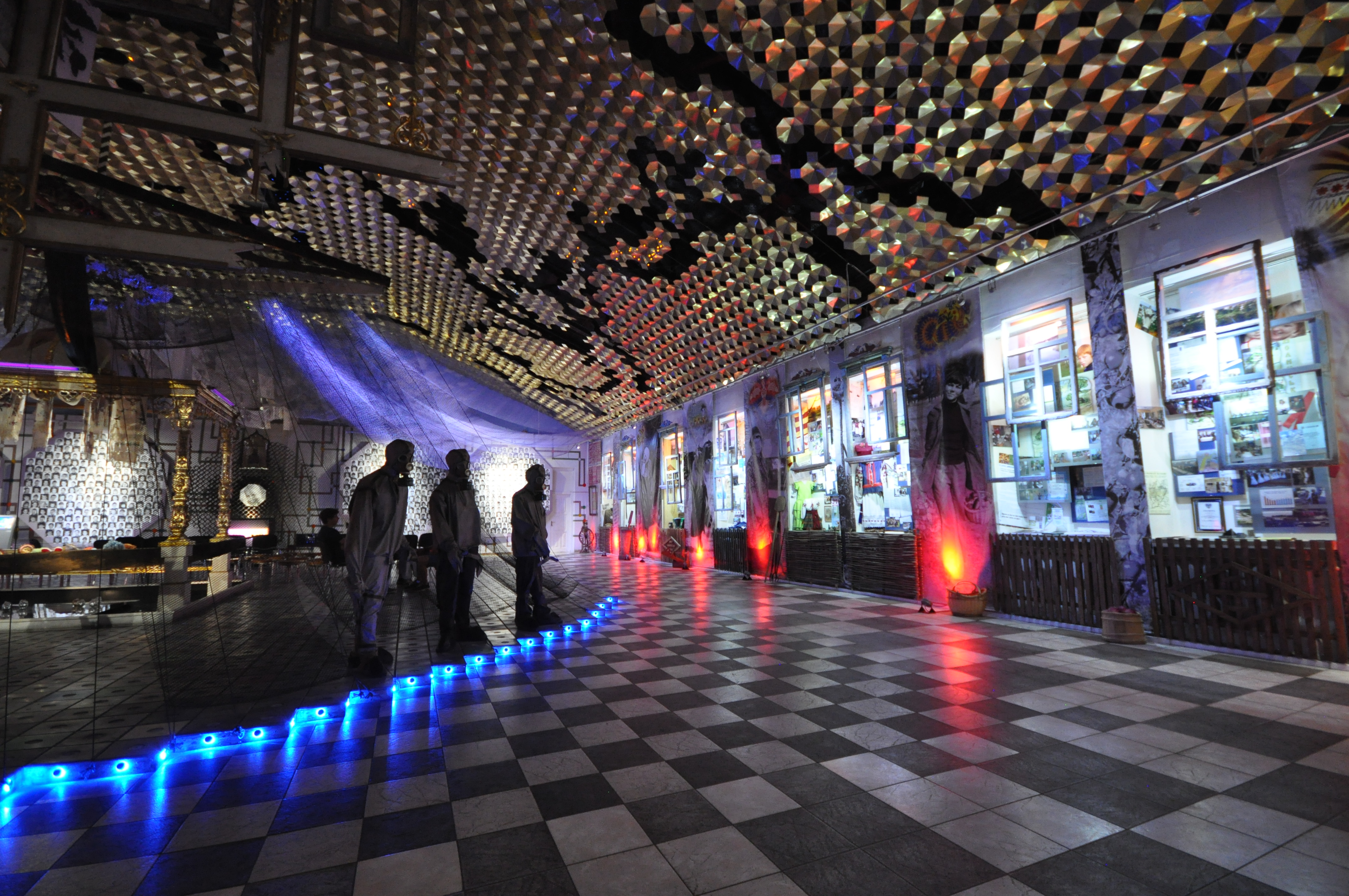
Exposition at Ukrainian National Chernobyl Museum

It is difficult to establish the total economic cost of the disaster. According to Mikhail Gorbachev, the Soviet Union spent 18 billion Rbls (US$6.22 billion in today's dollars) on containment and decontamination, virtually bankrupting itself. In 2005, the total cost over 30 years for Belarus was estimated at $235 billion. Gorbachev later wrote that "the nuclear meltdown at Chernobyl ... was perhaps the real cause of the collapse of the Soviet Union."

Ongoing costs remain significant; in their 2003–2005 report, the Chernobyl Forum stated that between five and seven percent of government spending in Ukraine is still related to Chernobyl, while in Belarus, over $13 billion was spent between 1991 and 2003. In 2018, Ukraine spent five to seven percent of its national budget on recovery activities. The economic loss is estimated at $235 billion in Belarus.

A significant impact was the removal of 784,320 ha of agricultural land and 694,200 ha of forest from production. While much has been returned to use, agricultural costs have risen due to the need for special cultivation techniques. Politically, the accident was significant for the new Soviet policy of glasnost, and helped forge closer USSR–US relations at the end of the Cold War. The disaster also became a key factor in the dissolution of the Soviet Union and shaped the 'new' Eastern Europe. Gorbachev stated that "More than anything else, (Chernobyl) opened the possibility of much greater freedom of expression, to the point that the (Soviet) system as we knew it could no longer continue."

Commentators have argued that the Chernobyl disaster was more likely to occur in a communist country than in a capitalist one. Soviet power plant administrators were reportedly not empowered to make crucial decisions during the crisis.

== Estimating the human death toll ==
The majority of premature deaths caused by Chernobyl are expected to be the result of cancers and other diseases induced by radiation in the decades after the event. This will be the result of a large population exposed to relatively low doses of radiation increasing the risk of cancer across that population. Some studies have considered the entire population of Europe. Interpretations of the current health state of exposed populations vary. Therefore, estimates of the ultimate human impact of the disaster have relied on numerical models of the effects of radiation on health. The effects of low-level radiation on human health are not well understood, and so the models used, notably the linear no threshold model, are open to question.

Given these factors, studies of Chernobyl's health effects have come up with different conclusions and are sometimes the subject of scientific and political controversy. The following section presents some of the major studies on this topic.

=== Official studies ===
==== Chernobyl Forum report ====
In September 2005, a draft summary report by the Chernobyl Forum, comprising a number of UN agencies including the International Atomic Energy Agency (IAEA), the World Health Organization (WHO), the United Nations Development Programme (UNDP), other UN bodies and the Governments of Belarus, the Russian Federation and Ukraine, set the number of deaths due to the accident at about 50 (47 workers who died of acute radiation syndrome and 9 children who died from thyroid cancer), and added that a "total of up to 4000 people could eventually die of radiation exposure from the Chernobyl nuclear power plant accident" (excess cancer deaths which might eventually happen among the 600,000 with the highest levels of exposure).

The full version of the WHO health effects report adopted by the UN, published in April 2006, included an added 5000 eventually possible fatalities from contaminated areas in Belarus, Russia and Ukraine and predicted that, in total, an upper limit of 9000 might eventually die from cancer among the 6.9 million most-exposed Soviet citizens. Some newspapers and antinuclear organizations claimed the paper was minimizing the consequences of the accident.

A study by Greenpeace estimated 10,000–200,000 additional deaths in Belarus, Russia, and Ukraine from 1990 to 2004. The report was criticized for relying on non-peer-reviewed studies, while Gregory Härtl, a WHO spokesman, suggested its conclusions were ideologically motivated.

The publication Chernobyl: Consequences of the Catastrophe for People and the Environment claimed 985,000 premature deaths, but was criticized for bias and using unverifiable sources.

==== 2008 UNSCEAR report ====
The United Nations Scientific Committee on the Effects of Atomic Radiation (UNSCEAR) produced a detailed report on the effects of Chernobyl for the General Assembly of the UN in 2011. This report concluded that 134 staff and emergency workers developed acute radiation syndrome and of those 28 died of radiation exposure within three months. Many of the survivors developed skin conditions and radiation induced cataracts, and 19 had since died, but from conditions not necessarily associated with radiation exposure. Of the several hundred thousand liquidators, apart from some emerging indications of increased leukaemia, there was no other evidence of health effects.

In the general public in the affected areas, the only effect with 'persuasive evidence' was the fraction of the 6,000 cases of thyroid cancer in adolescents of whom by 2005 15 cases had proved fatal. There was no evidence of increased rates of solid cancers or leukaemia among the general population. However, there was psychological worry about the effects of radiation.

The total deaths reliably attributable by UNSCEAR to the radiation produced by the accident therefore was 62.

The report concluded that 'the vast majority of the population need not live in fear of serious health consequences from the Chernobyl accident'.

==== 2006 International Journal of Cancer estimate ====
A 2006 paper in the International Journal of Cancer estimated that Chernobyl may have caused about 1,000 cases of thyroid cancer and 4,000 cases of other cancers in Europe by 2006. By 2065, models predict 16,000 cases of thyroid cancer and 25,000 cases of other cancers due to the accident.

The risk projections suggest that by now [2006] Chernobyl may have caused about 1000 cases of thyroid cancer and 4000 cases of other cancers in Europe, representing about 0.01% of all incident cancers since the accident. Models predict that by 2065 about 16,000 cases of thyroid cancer and 25,000 cases of other cancers may be expected due to radiation from the accident, whereas several hundred million cancer cases are expected from other causes.

=== Unofficial studies ===
==== TORCH report ====
In 2006, German Green Party Member of the European Parliament Rebecca Harms commissioned UK scientists Ian Fairlie and David Sumner for an alternate report (TORCH, The Other Report on CHernobyl) in response to the UN report. The report included areas not covered by the Chernobyl forum report, and also lower radiation doses. It predicted about 30,000 to 60,000 excess cancer deaths and warned that predictions of excess cancer deaths strongly depend on the risk factor used, and urged more research stating that large uncertainties made it difficult to properly assess the full scale of the disaster.

In 2016, an updated TORCH report was written by Ian Fairlie with support of Friends of the Earth Austria.

==== Greenpeace ====
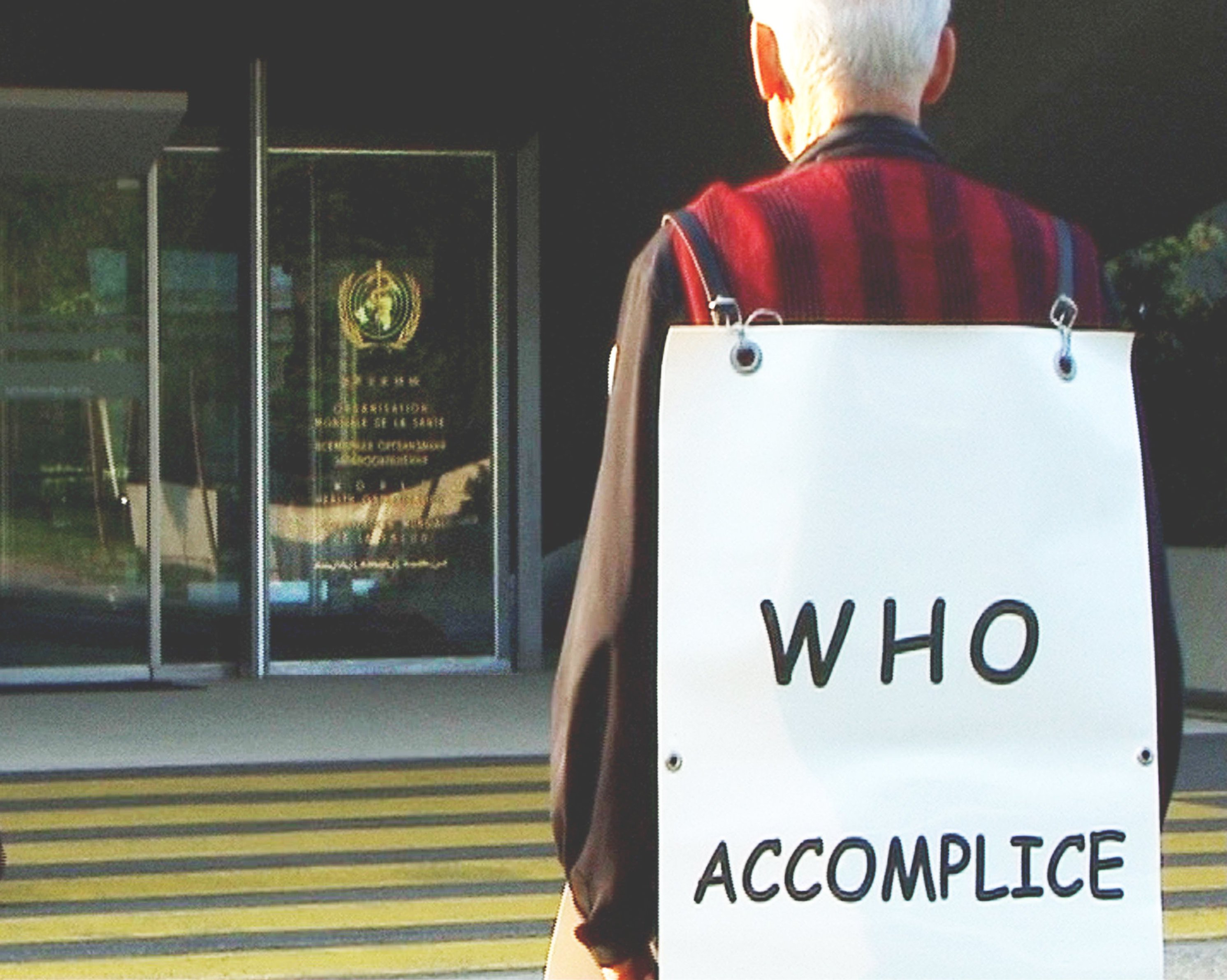
Demonstration on Chernobyl day near WHO in Geneva

Greenpeace claimed contradictions in the Chernobyl Forum reports, quoting a 1998 WHO study referenced in the 2005 report, which projected 212 dead from 72,000 liquidators. In its report, Greenpeace suggested there will be 270,000 cases of cancer attributable to Chernobyl fallout, and that 93,000 of these will probably be fatal, but state in their report that "The most recently published figures indicate that in Belarus, Russia and Ukraine alone the accident could have resulted in an estimated 200,000 additional deaths in the period between 1990 and 2004."

Blake Lee-Harwood, campaigns director at Greenpeace, believes that cancer was likely to be the cause of less than half of the final fatalities and that "intestinal problems, heart and circulation problems, respiratory problems, endocrine problems, and particularly effects on the immune system," will also cause fatalities. However, concern has been expressed about the methods used in compiling the Greenpeace report. It is not peer-reviewed nor does it rely on peer review science as the Chernobyl Forum report did.

==== April 2006 IPPNW report ====
According to an April 2006 report by the German affiliate of the International Physicians for Prevention of Nuclear Warfare (IPPNW), entitled "Health Effects of Chernobyl", more than 10,000 people are today affected by thyroid cancer and 50,000 cases are expected. The report projected tens of thousands dead among the liquidators. In Europe, it alleges that 10,000 deformities have been observed in newborns because of Chernobyl's radioactive discharge, with 5000 deaths among newborn children. They also claimed that several hundreds of thousands of the people who worked on the site after the accident are now sick because of radiation, and tens of thousands are dead.

==== Yablokov/Nesterenko publication ====
Chernobyl: Consequences of the Catastrophe for People and the Environment is an English translation of the 2007 Russian publication Chernobyl by Alexey Yablokov, Vassily Nesterenko and Alexey Nesterenko. It was published online in 2009 by the New York Academy of Sciences in their Annals of the New York Academy of Sciences. The New York Academy of Sciences included a disclaimer to inform readers it did not commission, endorse or peer review the work.

"In no sense did Annals of the New York Academy of Sciences or the New York Academy of Sciences commission this work; nor by its publication does the Academy validate the claims made in the original Slavic language publications cited in the translated papers. Importantly, the translated volume has not been formally peer‐reviewed by the New York Academy of Sciences or by anyone else."

The report presents an analysis of scientific literature and concludes that medical records between 1986, the year of the accident, and 2004 reflect 985,000 deaths as a result of the radioactivity released. The authors suggest that most of the deaths were in Russia, Belarus and Ukraine, but others were spread through the many other countries the radiation from Chernobyl struck. The literature analysis draws on over 1,000 published titles and over 5,000 internet and printed publications discussing the consequences of the Chernobyl disaster. The authors contend that those publications and papers were written by Eastern European authorities and have been downplayed or ignored by the IAEA and UNSCEAR. Author Alexy V. Yablokov was also one of the general editors on the Greenpeace commissioned report also criticizing the Chernobyl Forum findings published one year prior to the Russian-language version of this report.

A critical review by Dr. Monty Charles in the journal Radiation Protection Dosimetry states that Consequences is a direct extension of the 2005 Greenpeace report, updated with data of unknown quality. The New York Academy of Sciences also published a severely critical review by M. I. Balonov from the Institute of Radiation Hygiene (St. Petersburg, Russia) which stated that "The value of [Consequences] is not zero, but negative, as its bias is obvious only to specialists, while inexperienced readers may well be put into deep error." Several other critical responses have also been published.

In 2016, 187 local Ukrainians had returned and were living permanently in the zone.

==== Higher than statistically normal appearances of defects ====
The American Academy of Pediatrics published a study state that the overall rate of neural tube defects in the Rivne region of Ukraine is one of the highest in Europe (22 per 10,000 live births). The rate in Polissia (Ukraine) is 27.0 per 10,000. The study suggested that rates of microcephaly and microphthalmia may also be higher than normal.

==== Other studies and claims ====
- The claim is made, by Collette Thomas, writing on 24 April 2006, that someone in the Ukrainian Health Ministry claimed in 2006 that more than 2.4 million Ukrainians, including 428,000 children, have health problems related to the catastrophe. The claim appears to have been invented by her through interpretation of a webpage of the Kyiv Regional Administration. Psychological after-effects, as the 2006 UN report pointed out, have also had adverse effects on internally displaced persons.
- In a recently published study scientists from Forschungszentrum Jülich, Germany, published the "Korma-Report" with data of radiological long-term measurements that were performed between 1998 and 2007 in a region in Belarus that was affected by the Chernobyl accident. The internal radiation exposure of the inhabitants in a village in Korma County/Belarus caused by the existing radioactive contamination has experienced a decrease from a very high level. The external exposure, however, reveals a different picture. Although an overall decrease was observed, the organic constituents of the soil show an increase in contamination, not observed in soils from cultivated land or gardens. According to the Korma Report the internal dose will decrease to less than 0.2 mSv/a in 2011 and to below 0.1 mSv/a in 2020. Despite this, the cumulative dose will remain higher than "normal" due to external exposure. Resettlement may even be possible in former prohibited areas provided that people comply with appropriate dietary rules.
- Study of heightened mortality in Sweden. This study, and in particular the conclusions drawn, has been very criticized.
- One study reports increased levels of birth defects in Germany and Finland in the wake of the accident.
- A change in the human sex ratio at birth from 1987 onward in several European countries has been linked to Chernobyl fallout.
- In the Czech Republic, thyroid cancer has increased significantly after Chernobyl.
- The Abstract of the April 2006 International Agency for Research on Cancer report Estimates of the cancer burden in Europe from radioactive fallout from the Chernobyl accident stated "It is unlikely that the cancer burden from the largest radiological accident to date could be detected by monitoring national cancer statistics. Indeed, results of analyses of time trends in cancer incidence and mortality in Europe do not, at present, indicate any increase in cancer rates – other than of thyroid cancer in the most contaminated regions – that can be clearly attributed to radiation from the Chernobyl accident." They estimate, based on the linear no threshold model of cancer effects, that 16,000 excess cancer deaths could be expected from the effects of the Chernobyl accident up to 2065. Their estimates have very wide 95% confidence intervals from 6,700 deaths to 38,000.
- The application of the linear no threshold model to predict deaths from low levels of exposure to radiation was disputed in a BBC (British Broadcasting Corporation) Horizon documentary, broadcast on 13 July 2006. It offered statistical evidence to suggest that there is an exposure threshold of about 200 millisieverts, below which there is no increase in radiation-induced disease. Indeed, it went further, reporting research from Professor Ron Chesser of Texas Tech University, which suggests that low exposures to radiation can have a protective effect. The program interviewed scientists who believe that the increase in thyroid cancer in the immediate area of the explosion had been over-recorded, and predicted that the estimates for widespread deaths in the long term would be proved wrong. It noted the view of the World Health Organization scientist Dr Mike Rapacholi that, while most cancers can take decades to manifest, leukemia manifests within a decade or so: none of the previously expected peak of leukemia deaths has been found, and none is now expected. Identifying the need to balance the "fear response" in the public's reaction to radiation, the program quoted Dr Peter Boyle, director of the IARC: "Tobacco smoking will cause several thousand times more cancers in the [European] population."
- An article in Der Spiegel in April 2016 also cast doubt on the use of the linear no threshold model to predict cancer rates from Chernobyl. The article claimed that the threshold for radiation damage was over 100 millisieverts and reported initial results of large-scale trials in Germany by the GSI Helmholtz Centre for Heavy Ion Research and three other German institutes in 2016 showing beneficial results of decreasing inflammation and strengthening bones from lower radiation doses.
- Professor Wade Allison of Oxford University (a lecturer in medical physics and particle physics) gave a talk on ionising radiation 24 November 2006 in which he gave an approximate figure of 81 cancer deaths from Chernobyl (excluding 28 cases from acute radiation exposure and the thyroid cancer deaths which he regards as "avoidable"). In a closely reasoned argument using statistics from therapeutic radiation, exposure to elevated natural radiation (the presence of radon gas in homes) and the diseases of Hiroshima and Nagasaki survivors he demonstrated that the linear no-threshold model should not be applied to low-level exposure in humans, as it ignores the well-known natural repair mechanisms of the body.
- Bandashevsky measured levels of radioisotopes in children who had died in the Minsk area that had received Chernobyl fallout, and the cardiac findings were the same as those seen in test animals that had been administered Cs-137.
- Fred Mettler, a radiation expert, estimated approximately 9,000 Chernobyl-related cancer deaths worldwide, noting that while small relative to overall background cancer risk, the number is large in absolute terms.

==== French legal action ====
Since March 2001, 400 lawsuits have been filed in France against "X" (the French equivalent of John Doe, an unknown person or company) by the French Association of Thyroid-affected People, including 200 in April 2006. These persons are affected by thyroid cancer or goitres, and have filed lawsuits alleging that the French government, at the time led by Prime Minister Jacques Chirac, had not adequately informed the population of the risks linked to the Chernobyl radioactive fallout. The complaint contrasts the health protection measures put in place in nearby countries, warning against consumption of green vegetables or milk by children and pregnant women, with the relatively high contamination suffered by the east of France and Corsica. Although the 2006 study by the French Institute of Radioprotection and Nuclear Safety said that no clear link could be found between Chernobyl and the increase of thyroid cancers in France, it also stated that papillary thyroid cancer had tripled in the following years.

== See also ==
- Bellesrad
- Chernobyl Children's Project (UK)
- Comparison of Chernobyl and other radioactivity releases
- Chernobyl Heart
- Chernobyl necklace
- Chernobyl Shelter Fund
- Chernobyl Children's Project International
- Consequences of the Chernobyl disaster in France
- Deaths due to the Chernobyl disaster
- Environmental racism in Europe
- Acute radiation syndrome
- Ionizing radiation
- Fission products, a more complete description of the radioactive byproducts of nuclear reactors
- Liquidator (Chernobyl)
- List of Chernobyl-related articles
- Nuclear and radiation accidents
- Nuclear power debate
- Radiophobia
- Red Forest
- Three Mile Island accident
- Three Mile Island accident health effects
- Yury Bandazhevsky, a Belarusian scientist imprisoned from 2001 to 2005 after his publication of a report critical of the official investigation on the consequences of the Chernobyl disaster
