= Jayati Das-Munshi =

British psychiatrist

Jayati Das-Munshi FRCPsych
- Education: London School of Hygiene & Tropical Medicine; University College London Medical School
- Scientific career
- Workplaces: Institute of Psychiatry, Psychology and Neuroscience; King's College London
- Thesis: Does childhood disadvantage lead to poorer health in second generation Irish people living in Britain? (2014)

Jayati Das-Munshi is a British psychiatrist who is Professor and Chair of Social and Psychiatric Epidemiology at King's College London. Her research considers mental health inequalities and the social determinants.

== Early life and education ==
Das-Munshi studied medicine at the University College London Medical School. She completed an intercalated degree in medical sociology, during which she earned first class honours. She earned a master's degree in epidemiology at London School of Hygiene & Tropical Medicine in 2008. Das-Munshi completed her doctoral studies at the Institute of Psychiatry, Psychology and Neuroscience, where she explored whether childhood disadvantage resulted in poor health outcomes for second generation Irish people in Britain.

== Research and career ==
Das-Munshi investigates mental health inequalities and their social determinants. She has dedicated much of her career to the development of mental health policies and interventions that can prevent mental health problems, with a focus on people from vulnerable and marginalised communities. She is an expert in the use of longitudinal data, and was one of the first to link electronic health records to census data in England. The study looked at the links between mental health, ethnicity and employment.

Das-Munshi looks at the social and structural origins of mental illness. She studied how the COVID-19 pandemic impacted people with mental health conditions.

Das-Munshi is Director of Population Health Improvement UK, a UKRI-funded centre that looks to make improvements in mental health access for young people, people who have self-harmed and people with long-term health conditions. She is also involved with the Centre for Society and Mental Health, a programme that looks to improve mental health at a community level.

Das-Munshi is a consultant psychiatrist at St Christopher's Hospice.

== Selected publications ==
- Singer, Susanne; J Das-Munshi; E Brähler (2009). "Prevalence of mental health conditions in cancer patients in acute care--a meta-analysis". Annals of Oncology. 21 (5): 925–930. doi:10.1093/annonc/mdp515. PMID 19887467. Wikidata Q38873571.
- G James Rubin; Jayati Das-Munshi; Wessely, Simon (2005). "Electromagnetic hypersensitivity: a systematic review of provocation studies". Psychosomatic Medicine. 67 (2): 224–232. doi:10.1097/01.psy.0000155664.13300.64. PMID 15784787. Wikidata Q28241348.
- Jayati Das-Munshi; David Goldberg; Paul E Bebbington; et al. (2008). "Public health significance of mixed anxiety and depression: beyond current classification". British Journal of Psychiatry. 192 (3): 171–177. doi:10.1192/bjp.bp.107.036707. PMID 18310574. Wikidata Q50801969.
