= Fabrice André =

French medical oncologist

- Medical career
- Profession: Medical oncologist
- Field: Oncology
- Institutions: Gustave Roussy
- Sub-specialties: Breast cancer
- Research: Biomarkers and precision medicine

Fabrice André is a French medical oncologist specializing in breast cancer. He is the Director of Research at Gustave Roussy in Villejuif, France, and a professor of medicine at the University of Paris-Saclay. André also serves as the President of the European Society for Medical Oncology (ESMO) for the 2025-2026 term.

== Early life and education ==
Fabrice André was born on May 10, 1972. He completed his secondary education in Villard-de-Lans before pursuing higher studies in Grenoble. He earned a medical degree in oncology from the University of Grenoble in 2002 and obtained a PhD in Biotechnology from the University of Paris in 2005, with a dissertation on cancer immunotherapy. André completed his medical oncology residency at Gustave Roussy, where he became a University Professor-Hospital Practitioner in the Department of Medical Oncology in 2012.

== Career ==
From 2010 to 2016, Fabrice André led the Inserm 981/Gustave Roussy/Université Paris-XI joint research unit, focusing on predictive biomarkers and molecular strategies in anticancer therapy. He was the first chair of the ESMO Young Oncologist Committee and served as the coordinator of the ESMO Breast Cancer Faculty from 2012 to 2014, remaining a member since 2015. He was also a member of the ESMO Cancer Research Faculty from 2012 to 2014 and chaired the ESMO Translational Research and Precision Medicine Working Group until 2019, continuing as a member from 2020. Additionally, André is a member of the ESMO Council and served as the Scientific Co-Chair of the ESMO 2022 Congress and the MAP Congress.

Since 2020, he has been Gustave Roussy's Director of Research. He was a member of the Annals of Oncology editorial Board from 2010 to 2013, became an Associate Editor in 2014, and served as Editor-in-Chief from 2017 to 2023.

André was elected President of the European Society for Medical Oncology (ESMO) for the 2025–2026 term, having been selected as President-Elect on June 27, 2022.

Additionally, André is the chairman of the biomarker group at UNICANCER, the French cooperative group, and has served on the scientific committees of several international conferences, including SABCS, AACR, ECCO, ESMO, and IMPAKT.

== Work ==
Professor André’s research focuses on biomarkers and personalized therapies, with an emphasis on biomarker discovery, targeted agent development, and the integration of personalized medicine. He leads Phase I-III clinical trials on targeted therapies for breast cancer and oversees large-scale national studies on the implementation of high-throughput technologies in healthcare systems.

He has authored or co-authored 350 scientific publications in international journals and is recognized as a Highly Cited Researcher by the Web of Science Group. The think tank BIS Research also ranks him among the 25 most influential figures in precision medicine.

== Selected publications ==
- André, F; Ciruelos, E; Rubovszky, G; Campone, M; Loibl, S; Rugo, HS; Iwata, H; Conte, P; Mayer, IA; Kaufman, B; Yamashita, T; Lu, YS; Inoue, K; Takahashi, M; Pápai, Z; Longin, AS; Mills, D; Wilke, C; Hirawat, S; Juric, D (2019). "Alpelisib for PIK3CA-Mutated, Hormone Receptor-Positive Advanced Breast Cancer". N Engl J Med. 380 (20): 1929–1940. doi:10.1056/NEJMoa1813904. hdl:11577/3308753. PMID 31091374..
- "AACR Project GENIE: Powering Precision Medicine through an International Consortium". Cancer Discov. 7 (8): 818–831. 2017. doi:10.1158/2159-8290.CD-17-0151. PMC 5611790. PMID 28572459.; PMCID: PMC5611790.
- Andre, F; Schartz, NE; Movassagh, M; Flament, C; Pautier, P; Morice, P; Pomel, C; Lhomme, C; Escudier, B; Le Chevalier, T; Tursz, T; Amigorena, S; Raposo, G; Angevin, E; Zitvogel, L (2002). "Malignant effusions and immunogenic tumour-derived exosomes". Lancet. 360 (9329): 295–305. doi:10.1016/S0140-6736(02)09552-1. PMID 12147373..

== Awards and honours ==
- Outstanding Investigator Award in Breast Cancer – American Association for Cancer Research (AACR) (2021)
- Brinker Award for Scientific Distinction in Clinical Research – Susan G. Komen Foundation (2024)
- Giants of Cancer Care Award – American Society of Clinical Oncology (ASCO) (2024)
- Top 100 Xfluencers in Breast Cancer – OncoDaily (2024)
