= COVID-19 and cancer =

Impact of COVID-19 on those with cancer

Cancer is one of the underlying diseases that increases the risk of COVID-19 developing to a serious illness.

== Risk of severe illness ==
The NHS of the United Kingdom has warned that those undergoing active chemotherapy or radiotherapy for lung cancer and those with bone marrow cancers are vulnerable to serious illness if they become infected with COVID-19. In Sweden, individuals who recently got chemotherapy were found to be at a higher risk for developing severe illness following COVID-19.

== Recommendations ==
The European Society of Medical Oncology (ESMO) recommends that oncologists should remain ready to adjust their clinical routines in the wake of the COVID-19 pandemic. Recommendations for using telemedicine services, reducing clinic visits, switching intravenous therapies to subcutaneous or oral therapies, when possible. ESMO also recommends advising patients on infection control.

The NHS in England stresses that individual patient decisions have to be made by multidisciplinary teams. NHS has also established priority groups for those receiving anticancer treatments such that those with higher chances of success get prioritized for treatment over others.

The European Society of Surgical Oncology advises against seeing patients with cancer who are over 70 years of age in clinic, unless it is urgent.

== Long COVID-19 ==
Even though many COVID-19 patients recover within 2–6 weeks of the onset of symptoms, some develop symptoms that come and go for months. The possibility has been raised, but needs to be investigated further, that patients with long COVID-19 may be predisposed to the development of lung cancer.
