= Chernobyl necklace =

Typical scar as a result of thyroid cancer surgery

A Chernobyl necklace is a horizontal scar at the base of the throat which results from surgery to remove a thyroid cancer caused by fallout from a nuclear accident. The scar has come to be seen as one of the most graphic demonstrations of the impact of the Chernobyl disaster.

The term takes its name from the increased rate of thyroid cancer after the Chernobyl disaster. The scar has also been referred as the Belarus necklace or the Belarusian Necklace, in reference to the large number of thyroid cancer occurrences in the nation caused by the nuclear fallout from neighboring Ukraine. The use of the word necklace indicates its visual resemblance to the horizontal scar around the neck, but also contrasts the negative connotations of the scar with the beauty of an actual necklace.

== Cause ==
The radioactive iodine isotope iodine-131 (^{131}I) has a relatively high fission product yield; in the case of a nuclear accident, ^{131}I is released into the environment in the nuclear fallout. Iodine is a vital micronutrient in vertebrate biology, and tends to bioaccumulate in the thyroid gland—the primary iodine-reliant organ of the body—which requires it in order to synthesise thyroid hormones. Environmental ^{131}I is taken up in the diet, and like the stable isotope ^{127}I, is accumulated in the thyroid; once there, the high-energy beta radiation emitted by ^{131}I significantly increases the risk of cancer. Treatment of thyroid cancer may require surgery, potentially leaving the patient with one or two horizontal scars at the base of the neck. It is these scars that have been dubbed the "Chernobyl necklace".

== Occurrences ==
After the Chernobyl disaster, incidents of thyroid cancer among civilians in Belarus, Ukraine, Russia, and Poland have risen sharply. It is estimated that many of those affected have the necklace, however, no statistical information of the affected population exists at this time. See the article on Chernobyl disaster effects for details.

After the Fukushima Daiichi nuclear disaster, there has been some speculation that Japan faces a similar situation: its affected population may receive similar surgery and scarring ("wear the Chernobyl necklace") in the future.

== In literature ==
The phenomenon inspired the title of the 1999 book Bagrjane namisto ("The Crimson Necklace"), by poet and Chernobyl survivor Valentin Mikhailjuk.
