= Journal of Epidemiology and Biostatistics =

- Discipline: Medicine
- Language: English

Publication details
- Publisher: Martin Dunitz Ltd, part of the Taylor & Francis Group

Standard abbreviations
- ISO 4: J. Epidemiol. Biostat.

Indexing
- ISSN: 1359-5229

Links
- Journal homepage

The Journal of Epidemiology and Biostatistics is a peer-reviewed journal for epidemiological and biostatistical studies. It is published by Martin Dunitz Ltd, part of Taylor & Francis Group. It covers Biology, Mathematics and Statistics and Public Health. In 2002 the title was changed to Journal of Cancer Epidemiology and Prevention.
