= Chernobyl groundwater contamination =

Groundwater contaminated from the Chernobyl disaster

The Chernobyl disaster remains the major and most detrimental nuclear catastrophe which completely altered the radioactive background of the Northern Hemisphere. It happened in April 1986 on the territory of the former Soviet Union (modern Ukraine). The catastrophe led to the increase of radiation in nearly one million times in some parts of Europe and North America compared to the pre-disaster state. Air, water, soils, vegetation and animals were contaminated to a varying degree. Apart from Ukraine and Belarus as the worst hit areas, adversely affected countries included Russia, Austria, Finland and Sweden. The full impact on the aquatic systems, including primarily adjacent valleys of Pripyat river and Dnieper river, are still unexplored.

Substantial groundwater contamination is one of the gravest environmental impacts caused by the Chernobyl disaster. As a part of overall freshwater damage, it relates to so-called “secondary” contamination, caused by the delivery of radioactive materials through unconfined aquifers to the groundwater network It proved to be particularly challenging because groundwater basins, especially deep-laying aquifers, were traditionally considered invulnerable to diverse extraneous contaminants. To the surprise of scientists, radionuclides of Chernobyl origin were found even in deep-laying waters with formation periods of several hundred years.

== History ==
Subsurface water was especially affected by radioactivity in the 30-km zone of evacuation (so called “exclusion zone”), surrounding the Chernobyl Nuclear Power Plant, or CNPP (Kovar&Herbert, 1998). The major and most hazardous contaminant from the perspective of hydrological spread was Strontium-90. This nuclide showed the most active mobility in subsurface waters; its rapid migration through groundwater aquifer was first discovered in 1988-1989 Other perilous nuclear isotopes included Cesium-137, Cesium-143, Ruthenium-106, Plutonium-239, Plutonium-240, Americium-241 The primary source of contamination was the damaged 4th reactor, which had actually been a crash site and where concentration of Strontium-90 initially exceeded the admissible levels for drinking water in 103-104 times. The reactor remained an epicenter of irradiation even after the emergency personnel built “Sarcophagus”, or “Shelter”, a protective construction aimed to isolate it from the environment. The structure proved to be non-hermetic, permeable to rainfall, snow and dew concentrations in many parts of 1000 m2 area Additionally, high amounts of cesium, tritium and plutonium were delivered to groundwater due to leakage of enriched water from the 4th reactor while building of the “Shelter” was in progress As a result, considerable amounts of water condensed inside the “Shelter” and absorbed radiation from nuclides-containing dust and fuels. Although most of this water evaporated, some portions of it leaked to groundwater from the surface layers under the reactor chambers.

Other sources of groundwater contamination included: radioactive waste dumps on the territory of “exclusion zone”; cooling water reservoirs connected with aquifer; initial radioactive fallout which took place in first hours after the accident; and forest fires that led to accelerated spread of contaminated particles on soils of the surrounding area On the whole, the researchers recorded the probability of accumulation of nearly 30% of the overall surface contamination in the underground rock medium. This discovery demonstrates hazardous scales of radionuclides underground migration on the one hand, but the important function of igneous rock as protective shield against further spread of contaminants.

Recent revelations of facts concealed by the Soviets show that the problem of groundwater radioactive contamination in Chernobyl zone existed long before the actual disaster. The analyses conducted in 1983-1985 showed deviation of radioactive standards in 1,5-2 times, as a result of earlier accidental malfunctions of CNPP in 1982 When the catastrophe occurred, groundwater irradiation was caused due to contamination of lands in the area of the wrecked fourth reactor. Furthermore, subsurface water was contaminated through unconfined aquifer in correlation and proportionally to contamination of soil by isotopes of Strontium and Caesium . Upper groundwater aquifer and most of Artesian aquifers were damaged in first place due to massive surface contamination with radioactive isotopes Strontium-90 and Cesium-137. At the same time, considerable levels of radioactive content were fixed on the periphery of exclusion zone, including part of potable water delivery system. This revelation proved the fact of migration of radioactive contaminants through the groundwater aquifers

After the disaster, the Soviet Government took delayed and inefficient measures at neutralization of consequences of the accident. The issue of groundwater contamination was improperly addressed the first several months after the disaster, leading to colossal financial expenses with negligible result. At the same time, proper monitoring of the situation was mostly absent The primary attempts of disaster relief workers were directed to prevention of surface waters contamination. Large-scale radionuclide content in the underground water was monitored and detected only in April–May 1987, almost a year after the disaster

== Migration pathways of contamination ==
Unfortunately, hydrological and geological conditions in Chernobyl area promoted rapid radionuclide migration to subsurface water network. These factors include flat terrain, abundant precipitation and highly permeable sandy sediments Main natural factors of nuclides migration in the region can be divided into four groups, including: weather and climate-related (evaporation and precipitation frequency, intensity and distribution); geological (sediment permeability, drainage regimes, forms of vegetation); soil-borne (physical, hydrological and mechanical properties of lands); and lithological (terrain structures and types of rock). In meliorated areas migration processes are additionally influenced by anthropogenic drivers related to human agricultural activities. In this relation, specific parameters and type of drainage regime, melioration practices, water control and sprinkling can substantially accelerate natural tempos of migration of contaminants. For example, artificial drainage leads to substantial increase of absorption and flushing rates. These technological factors are particularly significant for the regions along Pripyat river and Dnieper river, which are almost totally subject to artificial irrigation and drainage within the network of constructed reservoirs and dams.

At the same time, both natural and artificial factors of migration have specific prioritization for different contaminants. The primary way of Strontium-90 transportation to the groundwater is its infiltration from contaminated soils and subsequent transition through the porous surfaces of unconfined aquifer. The scholars also fixed two additional alternative ways of migration of this radionuclide. The first one is “technogenous” transition, caused by poor construction of wells for water withdrawal or insufficient quality of materials used for their shells. During electric pumping of deep-laying artesian water, the stream unprotected passes through contaminated layers of upper aquifers and absorbs radioactive particles before getting into a well. This way of contamination was experimentally verified at the Kiev water intake wells. Another abnormal way of radionuclides migration are weak zones of crystalline rocks. The researches of Center of Radio-ecological Studies of the National Academy of Sciences of Ukraine showed that crustal surface has unconsolidated zones characterized by increased electric productivity, as well as higher moisture and emanation capacity.

As to Cesium-137, this nuclide demonstrates lower migration potential in Chernobyl soils and aquifers. Its mobility is hampered by such factors as: clay minerals which fixate radionuclides in rock, absorption and neutralization of isotopes through ion-exchange with other chemical components of water; partial neutralization by vegetation metabolic cycles; overall radioactive decay. Heavy isotopes of Plutonium and Americium have even lower transportation capacity both in and outside the exclusion zone. However, their hazardous potential should not be discarded considering extremely long half-life and unpredictable geo-chemical behavior

== Agricultural damage ==
Groundwater transportation of radionuclides belongs to the key pathways of contamination of lands engaged in agricultural production. In particular, due to vertical migration with rises of water levels, radioactive particles infiltrate soils and subsequently get into plants through the absorption system of their roots. This leads to internal irradiation of animals and people during consumption of contaminated vegetables This situation is aggravated by a predominantly rural type of settlement in the Chernobyl area, with most of population engaged in active agricultural production. It makes the authorities either remove the contaminated areas near Chernobyl from agricultural activities or spend funds for excavation and treatment of surface layers. These problems of damage to initially intact soils puts a heavy burden primarily on the Ukrainian and especially the Belarusian economy. Nearly one-quarter of the entire territory of Belarus was seriously contaminated with isotopes of Cesium. The authorities were obliged to exclude nearly 265 thousands hectares of cultivated lands from agricultural use till present day. Although complex chemical and agro-technological measures led to limited decrease of radionuclide content in food produced on contaminated territories, the problem remains largely unresolved Apart from economical damage, agricultural contamination via groundwater pathways is detrimental for biophysical security of the population. Consumption of food containing radionuclides became the major source of radioactive exposure of people in the region Thus agricultural damage eventually means direct and long-lasting threat to the public health.

== Health risks ==
The health impacts of groundwater contamination for population of Ukraine, Belarus and bordering states are usually perceived as extremely negative. The Ukrainian government initially implemented a costly and sophisticated remediation program. However, in view of limited financial resources and other more urgent health problems caused by the disaster, these plans were abandoned Not least, such a decision owed to the research results of domestic scholars showing that groundwater contamination does not contribute to the overall health risks substantially in regard to other active pathways of radioactive exposure in the “exclusion zone”, In particular, radioactive contamination of unconfined aquifer, which is usually considered a serious threat, has fewer economical and health impact in Chernobyl because subsurface water in “exclusion zone” is not used for household and drinking needs. The probability of using this water by local residents is excluded by a special status of Chernobyl area and relevant administrative prohibitions. The only group directly and inevitably exposed to health threats are emergency workers engaged in water drainage practices related to Chernobyl Nuclear Power Plant reactors deactivation and waste disposal operations.

As to contamination of confined aquifer, which is a source of technical and household water supply for Pripyat city (the largest city in Chernobyl area), it also does not pose immediate health threat due to permanent monitoring of water delivery system. In case any indexes of radioactive content exceed the norm, withdrawal of water from local boreholes will be suspended. Yet such situation poses a certain economic risk due to high expenditures necessary for ensuring alternative water supply system . At the same time, lethal doses of radiation in unconfined aquifer retain substantial prospective danger due to their considerable capacity of migration to confined aquifer and subsequently to surface water, primarily in the Pripyat River. This water can furthermore enter tributaries of the Dnieper River and Kiev Reservoir. In this way the number of animals and people using contaminated water for domestic purposes can drastically increase. Considering that Dnieper is one of the key water arteries of Ukraine, in case of breaching of integrity of the “Shelter” or long-lived waste repositories, extensive spill of radionuclides in groundwater can reach the scale of national emergency. According to official position of the monitoring staff, such scenario is unlikely because before getting to the Dnieper the content of Strontium-90 is usually considerably diluted in the Pripyat River and Kiev Reservoir. Yet this assessment is considered inaccurate by some experts due to imperfect evaluation model implemented Thus groundwater contamination led to a paradoxical situation in the realm of public health: direct exposure to radiation by using contaminated subsurface water for household purposes is incomparably less than indirect impact caused by nuclides migration to cultivated lands. In this regard, can be distinguished on-site and off-site health risks from contaminants in groundwater network of the exclusion zone Low on-site risks are produced by direct water takeoff for drinking and domestic needs. It was calculated that even if hypothetical residents use water on the territory of radioactive waste dumps, the risks would be far below admissible levels. Such results can be explained by underground water purification during its hydrological transportation in surface waters, rains and snowmelt Primary health risks are off-site, posed by radionuclide contamination of agricultural lands and caused, among other factors, by groundwater migration through unconfined aquifer. This process eventually leads to internal irradiation of people using food from the contaminated areas.

== Water protection measures ==
The urgency to take immediate measures for underground water protection in Chernobyl and Pripyat region was caused by perceived danger of transportation of radionuclides to the Dnieper River, thus contaminating Kiev, the capital of Ukraine, and 9 million other water users downstream. In this regard, on May 30, 1986 the government adopted the Decree on groundwater protection policy and launched a costly program of water remediation. However, these measures proved to be insufficient as they grounded upon incomplete data and absence of efficient monitoring. Without credible information, emergency staff launched “worst case” scenario, expecting maximum contamination density and minimal slowdown indexes. When the updated survey information showed negligible risks of excessive nuclides migration, remediation program was stopped. However, to this moment Ukraine already spent giant monetary funds equal to nearly 20 million dollars for this project, as well as exposed relief workers to needless danger of irradiation.

In 1990-2000s, the focus of protective measures shifted from remediation to construction of protective systems for the complete isolation of contaminated areas along Pripyat River and Chernobyl Nuclear Power Plant from the rest of the region. Since it was done, local authorities were advised to concentrate efforts on the permanent monitoring of the situation. The process of degradation of radionuclides was let to itself under so called “observed natural attenuation”

== Monitoring measures ==
In face of persistent disintegration of radioactive materials and highly unfavorable radiation background in “exclusion zone”, permanent monitoring was and remains crucial both for deescalation of environmental degradation and preventing humanitarian catastrophes among neighboring communities. Monitoring also allows to reduce parameter uncertainties and improve models of assessment, thus actually leading to more realistic vision of the problem and its scales. Until the late 1990s, methods of data collection for groundwater quality monitoring were of low efficiency and reliability. During installation of monitoring boreholes, the wells were contaminated with “hot fuel” particles from the surface ground, what made initial data inaccurate. Decontamination of boreholes from extraneous polluters could take 1,5–2 years. Another problem was insufficient purging of monitoring wells before sampling. This procedure, necessary for replacement of stale water inside boreholes with new water from aquifer, was introduced by monitoring personnel only in 1992. The importance of purging was immediately proved by substantial growth of Strontium-90 indexes in samples The quality of data was additionally worsened by corrosion of steel components of monitoring wells. Corrosive particles substantially altered radioactive background of aquifer. In particular, excessive content of iron compounds in water got into compensatory reactions with Strontium thus leading to deceptively lower Strontium-90 indexes in samples. In some cases, irrelevant design of well cages also impeded monitoring accuracy. The well constructions implemented by Chernobyl Nuclear Power Plant personnel in early 1990s had 12 meters long screening sections allowing only vertically arranged sampling. Such samples are hard to interpret as an aquifer usually has unequal vertical distribution of contaminants) Since 1994, the quality of groundwater observation in Chernobyl zone sufficiently improved. New monitoring wells are constructed with poli-vinylcloride materials instead of steel, with shortened screening sections, 1–2 m Additionally, in 1999-2012 there was created an experimental monitoring site in proximity to radioactive waste dumps area westward Chernobyl Nuclear Power Plant, called “Chernobyl Red Forest”. The elements of the new monitoring system include laboratory module, station for unsaturated zone monitoring, network of monitoring boreholes and meteorological station Its primary objectives include monitoring of such processes as: radionuclides extraction from “hot fuel particles” (HFP) dispersed in surface layer; their subsequent transition through the unsaturated aquifer, and condition of phreatic (saturation) zone. HFP are particles which emerged from burnt wood and concrete during initial explosion and subsequent fire in the “exclusion zone”. Unsaturated aquifer is provided with water and soil sampler, water containment sensors and tensiometers. Work of an experimental site allows to make real-time surveillance of Strontium-90 migration and condition in aquifer, yet simultaneously raises new questions. The monitoring staff noticed that fluctuations of water levels directly influence the release of radionuclides from sediments, while accumulation of organic matter in sediment correlates with geochemical parameters of aquifer. Additionally, for the first time the researchers detected Plutonium in deep-laying groundwater, which means that this contaminant also has a capacity to migrate in confined aquifer. However, specific means of this migration still remain unknown.

The researchers forecast that in case of inviolated protection of nuclear waste dumps in exclusion zone, the concentration of Strontium-90 up to 2020 will be much lower in subsurface water than admissible maximum indexes. Also, contamination of the Pripyat River as the most vulnerable surface water route by underground tributaries is unlikely in the next 50 years At the same time, the number of monitoring wells is still insufficient and needs expansion and modification. Also, the boreholes are distributed within the exclusion zone unevenly, without consideration of hydrological and radioactive specifics of the area (Kovar&Herbert, 1998

== Lessons learned ==
Chernobyl accident revealed complete unpreparedness of the local authorities to the resolution of environment-related issues of a nuclear disaster. Groundwater management is no exception. Without accurate real-time data and adjusted emergency management plans, the government spent enormous funds for groundwater remediation, which later proved to be needless. At the same time, really crucial top-priority measures, such as reliable isolation of the damaged 4th reactor, were performed on a poor-quality level. If the “Shelter” had been constructed without deficiencies as completely hermetic and isolating the 4th reactor from contact with external aerial, soil and groundwater mediums, it would make much greater contribution to prevent nuclides from entering in and migrating throughout the groundwater network Taking these failures into account, the following are lessons learned from Chernobyl tragedy for groundwater management:

- The necessity of consistent and technologically reliable monitoring system capable to produce high-quality real-time data;
- Exact monitoring data as a primary basis for any remedial practices and melioration policies;
- Criteria and purposes of groundwater management activities, be it remediation, construction works or agricultural restrictions, are to be identified at the stage of analysis and prior to any practical realization;
- Problems of groundwater contamination must be regarded in the wider perspective, with close correlation to other pathways and forms of contamination, because they all are interconnected and mutually influenced;
- It is always highly advisable to engage international experts and leading scholars to peer-reviewing of designed action plans;
- Groundwater management in areas of radioactive contamination must be based on integrated ecosystem approach, i.e. considering its influence on local and global ecosystems, well-being of local communities and long-lasting environmental impacts.
