= Annals of Oncology =

- Discipline: Oncology
- Language: English
- Edited by: Fabrice André

Publication details
- History: 1990-present
- Publisher: Elsevier
- Frequency: Monthly
- Open access: Hybrid
- Impact factor: 80.4 (2025)

Standard abbreviations
- ISO 4: Ann. Oncol.

Indexing
- CODEN: ANONE2
- ISSN: 0923-7534 (print); 1569-8041 (web)
- OCLC no.: 21289099

Links
- Journal homepage; Online access; Online archive

The Annals of Oncology is a peer-reviewed medical journal of oncology. It was launched in 1990 with Kluwer Academic Publishers and is currently published by Elsevier. It is the official journal of the European Society for Medical Oncology. The editor-in-chief is Fabrice André (Villejuif, France). Previous editors were Jean-Charles Soria, Jan Vermorken, David J. Kerr and Franco Cavalli.

Some articles are available for free public access.

Before coming to Elsevier the journal was published by Oxford University Press, and Springer.
