= European Society for Medical Oncology =

Professional organisation

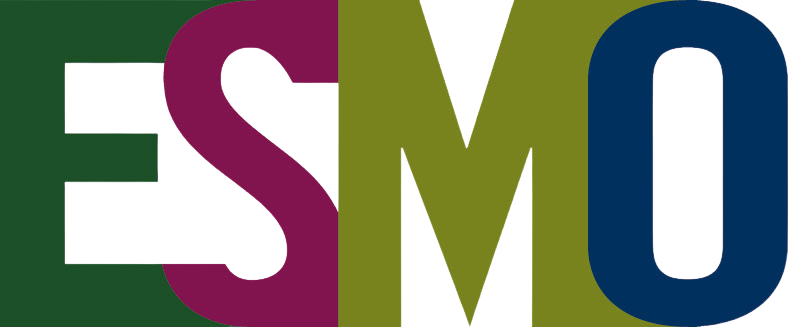
- Headquarters: Lugano, Switzerland
- Members: More than 50,000
- Official language: English
- Staff: 180
- Website: esmo.org

The European Society for Medical Oncology (ESMO) is a professional organisation for medical oncology. With more than 50,000 members representing oncology professionals worldwide, ESMO was founded in 1975.

== Journals ==
=== Annals of Oncology ===
Founded in 1990, ESMO’s flagship scientific journal, Annals of Oncology, publishes articles addressing medical oncology, surgery, radiotherapy, pediatric oncology, basic research and the comprehensive management of patients with malignant diseases. Annals of Oncology is the official journal of ESMO and from 2008 of the Japanese Society for Medical Oncology (JSMO)

=== ESMO Open ===
In 2016, ESMO launched a second journal, ESMO Open, an open-access, online-only publication initially published by BMJ and, since 2021, by Elsevier.

== ESMO Clinical Practice Guidelines ==
The ESMO Clinical Practice Guidelines (CPG) are intended to provide oncology professionals with a set of recommendations for the best standards of cancer care, based on the findings of evidence-based medicine. Each Clinical Practice Guideline includes information on the incidence of the malignancy, diagnostic criteria, staging of disease and risk assessment, treatment plans and follow-up designed to help oncologists deliver an appropriate quality of care to their patients.

== ESMO Conferences ==
The annual ESMO Congress is attended by 30,000 participants. The congress presents the latest scientific developments in basic, translational and clinical cancer research and contextualises new findings for practical implementation in every day patient care.

== Additional Continuing Medical Educational Resources ==
ESMO publishes handbooks, scientific meeting reports, and medical oncology training guidelines. The Society provides fellowships for research training for young oncologists, an Exam in Medical Oncology and an accreditation program for institutes providing patients with integrated supportive and palliative care. Through an online professional networking platform ESMO members collaborate, interact and share knowledge on topics of research and clinical practice.

== European Society for Medical Oncology Magnitude of Clinical Benefit Scale (ESMO-MCBS) ==
In 2015, ESMO published the first version of its Magnitude of Clinical Benefit Scale to grade the magnitude of clinical benefit of cancer therapies incorporating efficacy, long-term survival and side-effects of any anticancer agent into a single score. ESMO-MCBS was updated with the publication of the version 1.1 in 2017. Forms are available from the official website of ESMO.
