= Chernobyl disaster =

1986 nuclear accident in the Soviet Union

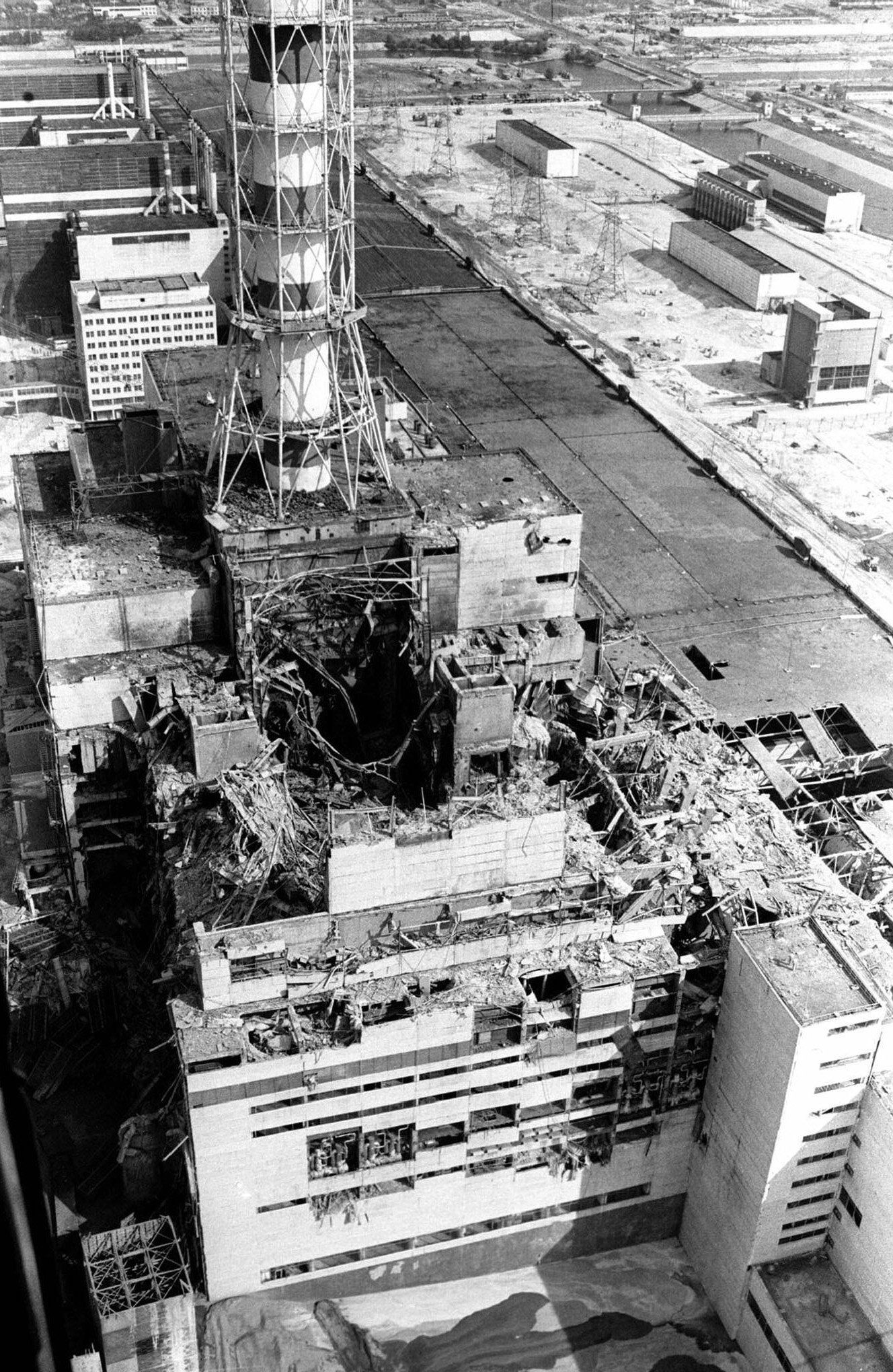
- Reactor 4 several months after the disaster. Reactor 3 can be seen behind the ventilation stack, Reactors 1 and 2 in the background.
- Date: 26 April 1986; 40 years ago
- Time: 01:23 MSD (UTC+04:00)
- Location: Chernobyl Nuclear Power Plant, Pripyat, Ukrainian SSR, Soviet Union (now Vyshhorod Raion, Kyiv Oblast, Ukraine); 51°23′23″N 30°05′57″E
- Type: Nuclear and radiation accident
- Cause: Reactor design and operator error
- Outcome: INES Level 7 (major accident)
- Deaths: 2 killed by debris (including 1 missing) and 28 killed by acute radiation sickness.; 15 terminal cases of thyroid cancer, with varying estimates of increased cancer mortality over subsequent decades; ~4,000–16,000 deaths from long-term effects (For more details, see Deaths due to the disaster)

On 26 April 1986, reactor 4 of the Chernobyl Nuclear Power Plant, located near Pripyat in the Ukrainian SSR of the Soviet Union, exploded. The accident resulted in dozens of direct deaths and a major release of radioactive material into the environment, causing widespread health effects and requiring the establishment of the Chernobyl exclusion zone. The response involved more than 500,000 personnel and cost an estimated 18 billion rubles (about $85 billion in 2026). It remains the most destructive nuclear disaster and the most expensive disaster in history, with an estimated cost of US$700 billion. It is one of only two nuclear accidents rated at the maximum severity on the International Nuclear Event Scale, the other being the 2011 Fukushima nuclear accident in Japan.

The disaster occurred while conducting a test to simulate the cooling of the reactor during a serious accident in blackout conditions. The operators carried out the test following an accidental drop in reactor power. Upon shutting down the reactor in an unstable condition, underlying design flaws led to a huge uncontrollable power surge. The reactor components ruptured and lost coolant, and the resulting steam explosions and meltdown destroyed the reactor building. That was followed by a core fire that dispersed radioactive contaminants across the Soviet Union and Europe. The Soviet government established an exclusion zone with a 10-kilometre (6.2 mi) radius 36 hours after the accident, initially evacuating around 49,000 people. That was later expanded to 30 kilometres (19 mi), resulting in the evacuation of approximately 68,000 more people. The government did not publicly acknowledge the disaster until two days after the explosion, when elevated radiation levels were detected in Sweden.

Following the explosion, which killed two engineers and severely burned two others, an emergency operation began to put out the fires and stabilize the reactor. Of the 237 workers hospitalized, 134 showed symptoms of acute radiation syndrome (ARS); 28 of them died within three months. Over the next decade, 14 more workers (nine of whom had ARS) died of various causes mostly unrelated to radiation exposure. This is the only instance in commercial nuclear power history where radiation-related fatalities occurred. As of 2005, 6,000 cases of childhood thyroid cancer occurred within the affected populations (15 of them fatal), "a large fraction" being attributed to the accident. Long-term death estimates range from up to 4,000 in Ukraine, Belarus, and Russia (per the United Nations) to 16,000 in total across Europe.

Pripyat was abandoned and replaced by the purpose-built city of Slavutych. The Chernobyl Nuclear Power Plant sarcophagus, completed in December 1986, reduced the spread of radioactive contamination and provided radiological protection for the crews of the undamaged reactors. In 2016–2018, the Chernobyl New Safe Confinement was constructed around the old sarcophagus to enable the removal of the reactor debris, and clean-up is scheduled for completion by 2065.

== Accident sequence ==
=== Background ===
==== Reactor cooling after shutdown ====
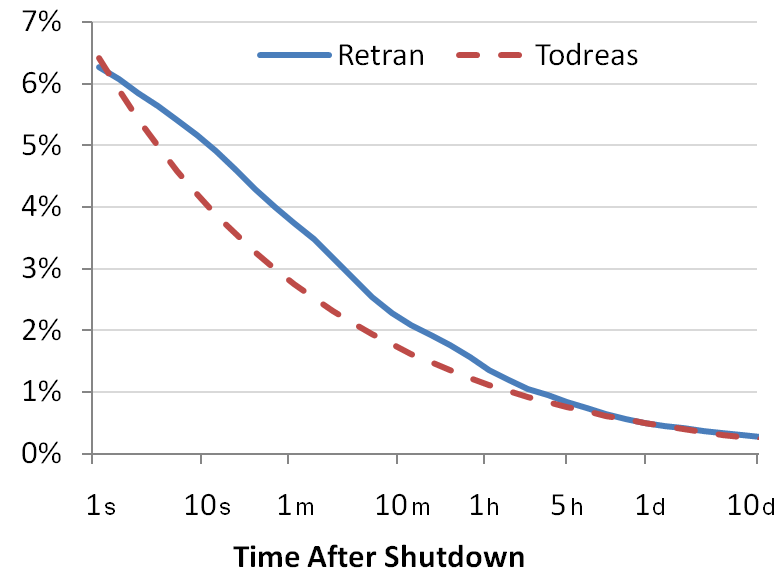
Reactor decay heat shown as % of thermal power from time of sustained fission shutdown using two different correlations. Due to decay heat, solid fuel power reactors need high flows of coolant after a fission shutdown for a considerable time to prevent fuel cladding damage, or in the worst case, a full core meltdown.

The RBMK reactors at Chernobyl used water as a coolant, circulated by electrically-driven main pumps. Reactor no. 4 had 1,661 individual fuel channels, requiring approximately 42 million litres of coolant per hour for the entire reactor. In normal reactor operation, most heat is generated by nuclear fission, but over 6% comes from radioactive decay, which continues after fission ceases. Continued coolant circulation is therefore essential to prevent core overheating or core meltdown.

To allow this continued cooling in the case of a total electrical power loss, each of Chernobyl's reactors had three backup diesel generators to power the main pumps, but they took 60–75 seconds to reach full load capability. Flywheels on each pump allowed continued coolant flow using their rotational momentum to bridge the gap until generator availability. However, a potential safety risk existed if a station electrical blackout occurred simultaneously with the rupture of a coolant pipe. In this scenario the emergency core cooling system (ECCS) must pump additional water into the core. This required electrical power, which would be absent. To cover this it had been theorized that the rotational momentum of the reactor's steam turbine could be used to generate the required electrical power for the feedwater pumps under the control of the ECCS. The turbine's speed would run down as energy was taken from it, but there might be sufficient energy to provide electrical power to run these pumps for 45 seconds. This may not bridge the gap between an external power failure and the full availability of the emergency generators, but would alleviate the situation.

==== Safety test ====
The turbine run-down energy capability still needed to be confirmed experimentally, and previous tests had ended unsuccessfully. An initial test carried out in 1982 indicated that the excitation voltage of the turbine-generator was insufficient. The electrical system was modified and the test was repeated in 1984, but again proved unsuccessful. In 1985, the test was conducted a third time, but also yielded no results due to a problem with the recording equipment. The test procedure was to be run again in 1986 and was scheduled to take place during a controlled power-down of reactor no. 4, which was preparatory to a planned maintenance outage.

A test procedure had been written, but the authors were not aware of the unusual RBMK-1000 reactor behaviour under the planned operating conditions. It was regarded as purely an electrical test of the generator, even though it involved critical unit systems. According to the existing regulations, such a test did not require approval by either the chief design authority for the reactor (NIKIET) or the nuclear safety regulator. The test program called for disabling the emergency core cooling system, a passive/active system of core cooling intended to provide water to the core in a loss-of-coolant accident. Approval from the site chief engineer had been obtained according to regulations.

The test procedure was intended to run as follows:

1. The reactor thermal power was to be reduced to between 700 MW and 1,000 MW (to allow for adequate cooling, as the turbine would be spun at operating speed while disconnected from the power grid).
2. The steam-turbine generator was to be run at normal operating speed.
3. Four out of eight main circulating pumps were to be supplied with off-site power, while the other four would be powered by the turbine.
4. When the correct conditions were achieved, the steam supply to the turbine generator would be closed, which would trigger an automatic reactor shutdown in ordinary conditions.
5. The voltage provided by the coasting turbine would be measured, along with the voltage and revolutions per minute (RPMs) of the four main circulating pumps being powered by the turbine.
6. When the emergency generators supplied full electrical power, the turbine generator would be allowed to continue free-wheeling down.

==== Test delay and shift change ====
Process flow diagram of the reactor. There were four main coolant pumps (item 11) per loop, of which three were used in normal production with one in standby. The feedwater pumps are not shown.

Size comparison of Generation II reactor vessels, a design classification of commercial reactors built until the end of the 1990s. The RBMK reactor is depicted as a gray rectangle.

The test was to be conducted during the day-shift of 25 April 1986 as part of a scheduled reactor shutdown. The day shift had been instructed in advance on the reactor operating conditions to run the test, and a special team of electrical engineers was present to conduct the electrical test once the correct conditions were reached. As planned, a gradual reduction in the output of the power unit began at 01:06 on 25 April, and the power level had reached 1600 MW of its nominal 3,200 MW thermal level by the beginning of the day shift.

The day shift was scheduled to perform the test at 14:15. Preparations for the test were carried out, including the disabling of the emergency core cooling system. Meanwhile, another regional power station unexpectedly went offline. At 14:00, the Kiev electrical grid controller requested that the further reduction of Chernobyl's output be postponed, as power was needed to satisfy peak evening demand.

Soon, the day shift was replaced by the evening shift. Despite the delay, the emergency core cooling system was left disabled. This system had to be disconnected via a manual isolating slide valve, which in practice meant that two or three people spent the whole shift manually turning sailboat-helm–sized valve wheels. The system had no influence on the disaster, but allowing the reactor to run for 11 hours outside of the test without emergency protection was indicative of a general lack of safety culture.

At 23:04, the Kiev grid controller allowed the reactor shutdown to resume. The day shift had long since departed, the evening shift was also preparing to leave, and the night shift would not take over until midnight, well into the job. According to plan, the test should have been finished during the day shift, and the night shift would only have had to maintain decay heat cooling systems in an otherwise shut-down plant.

The night shift had very limited time to prepare for and carry out the experiment. Anatoly Dyatlov, deputy chief-engineer of the Chernobyl Nuclear Power Plant (ChNPP), was present to direct the test. He was one of the test's chief authors and he was the highest-ranking individual present. Unit shift supervisor Aleksandr Akimov was in charge of the Unit 4 night shift, and Leonid Toptunov was the senior reactor control engineer responsible for the reactor's operational regimen, including the movement of the control rods. 25-year-old Toptunov had worked independently as a senior engineer for approximately three months.

==== Unexpected drop of the reactor power ====
The test plan called for a gradual decrease in reactor power to a thermal level of 700–1000 MW, and an output of 720 MW was reached at 00:05 on 26 April. However, due to the reactor's production of a fission byproduct, xenon-135, which is a reaction-inhibiting neutron absorber, power continued to decrease in the absence of further operator action, a process known as reactor poisoning. In steady-state operation, this is avoided because xenon-135 is "burned off" as quickly as it is created, becoming the highly stable xenon-136. However, with reactor power reduced, large quantities of previously produced iodine-135 decayed into the neutron-absorbing xenon-135 faster than the reduced neutron flux could "burn it off". Xenon poisoning in this context made reactor control more difficult but was a predictable phenomenon during such a power reduction.

When the reactor power had decreased to approximately 500 MW, the reactor power control was switched from local automatic regulator to the automatic regulators, to manually maintain the required power level. AR-1 then activated, removing all four of AR-1's control rods automatically, but AR-2 failed to activate due to an imbalance in its ionization chambers. In response, Toptunov reduced power to stabilize the automatic regulators' ionization sensors. The result was a sudden power drop to an unintended near-shutdown state, with a power output of 30 MW thermal or less. The exact circumstances that caused the power drop are unknown. Most reports attribute the power drop to Toptunov's error, but Dyatlov reported that it was due to a fault in the AR-2 system.

The reactor was now producing only 5% of the minimum initial power level prescribed for the test. This low reactivity inhibited the burn-off of xenon-135 within the reactor core and hindered the rise of reactor power. To increase power, control-room personnel removed numerous control rods from the reactor. Several minutes elapsed before the reactor was restored to 160 MW at 00:39, at which point most control rods were at their upper limits, but the rod configuration was still within its normal limit, calculated as equivalent to having more than 15 rods inserted. Over the next twenty minutes, reactor power would be increased further to 200 MW.

==== Reactor conditions priming the accident ====
When an output of 200 MW was reached, preparation for the experiment continued, although power was still much lower than the prescribed 700 MW. As part of the test, two additional main circulating pumps were activated at 01:05. The increased coolant flow lowered the overall core temperature and reduced bubbles (voids) from boiling coolant. Because water absorbs neutrons better than steam, neutron flux and power accordingly decreased. The operators responded by removing more manual control rods to maintain power, resulting in the inserted control rod equivalent value falling below its required level of 15. This was not apparent to the operators, because there were no instruments capable of calculating this value in real time.

These actions left the reactor in an extremely unstable state. Nearly all of the 211 control rods had been withdrawn, and excessive coolant flow prevented the water from adequately cooling between cycles, causing it to re-enter the core at close to boiling point. Unlike other light-water reactor designs, the RBMK design had a positive void coefficient, meaning that voids formed during boiling had the effect of increasing rather than decreasing core reactivity. More boiling and hence more voids tended to intensify the nuclear chain reaction, which caused yet more boiling. Unknown to the operators, this positive feedback loop had little to restrain it, and the reactor became highly sensitive to void formation, and at risk of an uncontrolled power surge.

=== Accident ===
==== Test execution ====
Plan view of reactor no.4 core. The number on each control rod indicates the insertion depth in centimeters one minute before the disaster. neutron detectors (12) control rods (167) short control rods from below reactor (32) automatic control rods (12) pressure tubes with fuel rods (1661)

At 01:23:04, the test began. Four of the eight main circulating pumps (MCP) were to be powered by voltage from the coasting turbine, while the remaining four pumps received electrical power from the grid as usual. The steam to the turbines was shut off, beginning a run-down of the turbine generator. The diesel generators started and sequentially picked up loads; the generators were to have completely picked up the MCPs' power needs by 01:23:43. As the momentum of the turbine generator decreased, so did the power it produced for the pumps. The water flow rate decreased, leading to increased formation of steam voids in the coolant flowing through the fuel pressure tubes.

==== Reactor shutdown and power excursion ====
At 01:23:40, as the experiment was wrapping up, an operator pressed the emergency AZ-5 button to initiate a scram (emergency shutdown) of the reactor, perhaps in preparation for scheduled maintenance. The reason for the timing is uncertain, as both Akimov and Toptunov would die shortly after the alarm. The atmosphere in the control room at that point was calm, according to eyewitnesses, and there were no active emergency signals at that time. Representatives of the reactor's design team would later argue that the button must have been pressed only after the reactor had begun to self-destruct.

The AZ-5 button engaged a drive mechanism to fully insert all control rods, including the manual control rods that had been withdrawn earlier. In the RBMK design, each control rod had attached to its end a graphite neutron moderator extension, the purpose of which was to boost reactor output by displacing neutron-absorbent water when the main part of the control rod was fully withdrawn. When the control rod was at maximum extraction, the graphite extension sat within the water of the core, its neutron-moderating effect operating to increase reactor power.

The rods moved at 0.4 m/s, taking 18 to 20 seconds to travel the full height of the core, about 7 m (23 ft). As the control rods moved downward into the reactor, their extensions initially displaced neutron-absorbing water with neutron-moderating graphite. It was known that in the RBMK design a scram could therefore initially increase the reaction rate within the core. This behaviour had been discovered in 1983, when the insertion of control rods in a similar reactor at Ignalina Nuclear Power Plant had induced a power spike. Countermeasures were, however, not implemented. The IAEA investigative report INSAG-7 later stated, "Apparently, there was a widespread view that the conditions under which the positive scram effect would be important would never occur. However, they did appear in almost every detail in the course of the actions leading to the Chernobyl accident."

A few seconds into the scram, a power spike occurred, and the core overheated, causing some of the fuel rods to fracture. It has been speculated that this may have blocked the control rods, jamming them at one-third insertion. Within three seconds the reactor's output rose above 530 MW.

Instruments did not register the subsequent course of events; they were reconstructed through mathematical simulation. The power spike would have caused an increase in fuel temperature and steam buildup, leading to a rapid increase in steam pressure. That caused the fuel cladding to fail, releasing the fuel elements into the coolant and rupturing the channels in which these elements were located.

==== Explosions ====
As the scram continued, the reactor output jumped to around 30,000 MW thermal, 10 times its normal operational output, the last indicated reading on the control panel. According to some estimates, the power spike may have been 10 times higher than that. It was not possible to reconstruct the precise sequence that led to the destruction of the reactor and the power unit building, but a steam explosion appears to have been the next event. Explosive steam pressure from the damaged fuel channels escaping into the reactor's exterior cooling structure that caused the explosion that destroyed the reactor casing, tearing off and blasting the upper plate called the upper biological shield (to which the entire reactor assembly was fastened) through the roof of the reactor building. This is believed to be the first explosion that many heard.

This explosion ruptured further fuel channels, as well as severing most of the coolant lines feeding the reactor chamber. As a result, the remaining coolant flashed to steam and escaped the reactor core. The total water loss combined with a high positive void coefficient further increased the reactor's thermal power.

A second, more powerful explosion, estimated to have had the power equivalent of 225 tons of TNT, occurred two or three seconds after the first, dispersing the damaged reactor core and effectively terminating the nuclear chain reaction. The blast further compromised the reactor containment vessel, ejecting red-hot fragments of graphite moderator and damaged fuel channel material. Observers outside Unit 4 reported burning lumps of material and sparks shooting into the air above the reactor, some of which fell onto the roof of the machine hall and started fires. Approximately 25% of the graphite blocks and overheated material from the fuel channels were expelled. Damage to the building established an airflow through the core, which fanned graphite fires and significantly contributed to the release and spread of radioactive fallout. (Note: Although most reports on the Chernobyl accident refer to a number of graphite fires, it is highly unlikely that the graphite itself burned. According to the General Atomics website: "It is often incorrectly assumed that the combustion behavior of graphite is similar to that of charcoal and coal. Numerous tests and calculations have shown that it is virtually impossible to burn high-purity, nuclear-grade graphites." On Chernobyl, the same source states: "Graphite played little or no role in the progression or consequences of the accident. The red glow observed during the Chernobyl accident was the expected color of luminescence for graphite at 700°C and not a large-scale graphite fire, as some have incorrectly assumed." Similarly, nuclear physicist Yevgeny Velikhov noted some two weeks after the accident, "Until now the possibility of a catastrophe really did exist: A great quantity of fuel and graphite of the reactor was in an incandescent state." That is, all the nuclear-decay heat that was generated inside the uranium fuel (heat that would normally be extracted by back-up coolant pumps, in an undamaged reactor) was instead responsible for making the fuel itself and any graphite in contact with it, glow red-hot. This is contrary to the often-cited interpretation, which is that the graphite was red-hot chiefly because it was chemically oxidizing with the air.)

After the larger explosion, several employees went outside to get a clearer view. One survivor, Aleksandr Yuvchenko, said that he looked up towards the reactor hall and saw a "very beautiful" laser-like beam of blue light caused by the ionized-air glow that appeared to be "flooding up into infinity".

=== Possible causes of the second explosion ===
There are several hypotheses about the nature of the second, larger explosion. One view was that the second explosion was caused by the combustion of hydrogen, which had been produced either by the overheated steam-zirconium reaction or by the reaction of red-hot graphite with steam that produced hydrogen and carbon monoxide. Another hypothesis, by Konstantin Checherov, published in 1998, was that the second explosion was a thermal explosion of the reactor due to the uncontrollable escape of fast neutrons caused by the complete water loss in the reactor core.

The force of the second explosion and the ratio of xenon radioisotopes released after the accident led Sergei A. Pakhomov and Yuri V. Dubasov to theorize in 2009 that the second explosion could have been an extremely fast nuclear power transient resulting from core material melting in the absence of its water coolant and moderator. Pakhomov and Dubasov argued that there was no delayed supercritical increase in power but a runaway prompt criticality, similar to the explosion of a fizzled nuclear weapon.

Their evidence came from Cherepovets, a city 1000 km northeast of Chernobyl, where physicists from the V.G. Khlopin Radium Institute had measured anomalous high levels of xenon-135—a short half-life isotope—four days after the explosion. This meant that a nuclear event in the reactor may have ejected xenon to higher altitudes in the atmosphere than the later fire did, allowing widespread movement of xenon to remote locations. This was an alternative to the more accepted explanation of a positive-feedback power excursion where the reactor disassembled itself by a steam explosion. The energy released by the second explosion, which produced the majority of the damage, was estimated by Pakhomov and Dubasov to be at 40 billion joules, the equivalent of about 10 tons of TNT.

The nuclear fizzle hypothesis was examined in 2017 by Lars-Erik De Geer, Christer Persson and Henning Rodhe, who considered such an event to be the more probable cause of the first explosion. Both analyses argue that the nuclear fizzle event, whether producing the second or first explosion, consisted of a prompt chain reaction that was limited to a small portion of the reactor core, since self-disassembly occurs rapidly in fizzle events.

=== Accident investigation ===
The IAEA had created the International Nuclear Safety Advisory Group (INSAG) in 1985. INSAG produced two significant reports on Chernobyl: INSAG-1 in 1986, and a revised report, INSAG-7, in 1992. According to INSAG-1, the main cause of the accident was the operators' actions, but according to INSAG-7, the main cause was the reactor's design. Both reports identified an inadequate "safety culture" at all managerial and operational levels as a major underlying factor.

== Emergency response ==
=== Fire containment ===
Firefighter Leonid Telyatnikov being decorated for bravery

Contrary to safety regulations, bitumen, a combustible material, had been used in the construction of the roof of the reactor building and the turbine hall. Ejected material ignited at least five fires on the roof of adjacent reactor no. 3, which was still operating. It was imperative to put out those fires and protect the cooling systems of reactor no. 3. Inside reactor no. 3, the chief of the night shift, Yuri Bagdasarov, wanted to shut down the reactor immediately, but chief engineer Nikolai Fomin refused. The operators were given respirators and potassium iodide tablets and told to continue working. At 5:00, Bagdasarov made his own decision to shut down the reactor, which was confirmed in writing by Dyatlov and Station Shift Supervisor Rogozhkin.

Shortly after the accident, firefighters arrived. First on the scene was a Chernobyl Power Station firefighter brigade under the command of Lieutenant Volodymyr Pravyk, who was ultimately to die two weeks later of acute radiation sickness. They were not told how dangerously radioactive the smoke and the debris were, and may not even have known that the accident was anything more than a regular electrical fire: "We didn't know it was the reactor. No one had told us." Grigorii Khmel, the driver of one of the fire engines, described what happened:

We arrived there at 10 or 15 minutes to two in the morning ... We saw graphite scattered about. Misha asked: "Is that graphite?" I kicked it away. But one of the fighters on the other truck picked it up. "It's hot," he said. The pieces of graphite were of different sizes, some big, some small enough to pick them up [...] We didn't know much about radiation. Even those who worked there had no idea. There was no water left in the trucks. Misha filled a cistern and we aimed the water at the top. Then those boys who died went up to the roof—Vashchik, Kolya and others, and Volodya Pravik ... They went up the ladder ... and I never saw them again.

Image showing a graphite moderator block ejected from the core

Anatoli Zakharov, a fireman stationed in Chernobyl, offered a different description in 2008: "I remember joking to the others, 'There must be an incredible amount of radiation here. We'll be lucky if we're all still alive in the morning.'" He also stated, "Of course we knew! If we'd followed regulations, we would never have gone near the reactor. But it was a moral obligation—our duty. We were like kamikaze."

The immediate priority was to extinguish fires on the roof of the station and the area around the building containing reactor no. 4 to protect no. 3. The fires were extinguished by 5:00, but many firefighters received high doses of radiation. The fire inside reactor no. 4 continued to burn until 10 May 1986; it is possible that well over half of the graphite ultimately burned out.

In an attempt to seal off radiation, more than 5,000 tonnes of sand, lead, clay, and neutron-absorbing boron were dropped from helicopters onto the burning reactor, although it was later found that virtually none of those materials had reached the core. Around 600 Soviet pilots risked dangerous levels of radiation to fly the thousands of flights needed.

One firefighter described his experience of the radiation as "tasting like metal", and feeling a sensation similar to pins and needles all over his face. This is consistent with the description given by Louis Slotin, a nuclear physicist of the Manhattan Project who died days after a fatal radiation overdose from a criticality accident.

=== Radiation levels ===
The explosion and fire threw hot particles of the nuclear fuel and more dangerous fission products into the air. The ionizing radiation levels in the worst-hit areas of the reactor building have been estimated to be 5.6 roentgens per second (R/s), equivalent to more than 20,000 roentgens per hour. A lethal dose is around 500 roentgens (~4.4 Gray (Gy) in modern radiation units) over five hours. In some areas, unprotected workers received fatal doses in less than a minute. A dosimeter capable of measuring up to 1,000 R/s was buried in the rubble of a collapsed part of the building, and another one failed when turned on. Most remaining dosimeters had limits of 0.001 R/s and therefore read "off scale". The reactor crew could ascertain only that the radiation levels were somewhere above 0.001 R/s (3.6 R/h), while the true levels were vastly higher in some areas.

Because of inaccurate low readings, reactor crew chief Aleksandr Akimov assumed that the reactor was intact. The evidence of pieces of graphite and reactor fuel lying around the building was ignored, and the readings of another dosimeter brought in by 04:30 were dismissed under the assumption that the new dosimeter must have been defective. Akimov stayed in the reactor building until morning, sending members of his crew to try to pump water into the reactor. None of them wore any protective gear. Most, including Akimov, died from radiation exposure within three weeks.

=== Evacuation ===
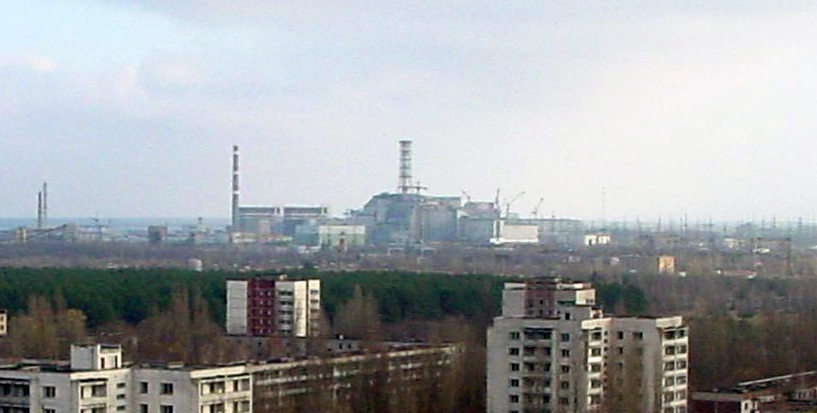
Pripyat with the Chernobyl Nuclear Power Plant in the distance

The nearby city of Pripyat was not immediately evacuated, and the townspeople were not alerted during the night to what had just happened. Within a few hours, dozens of people fell ill. Later, they reported severe headaches and metallic tastes in their mouths, along with uncontrollable fits of coughing and vomiting. As the plant was run by authorities in Moscow, the government of Ukraine did not receive prompt information on the accident.

Valentyna Shevchenko, then Chairwoman of the Presidium of Verkhovna Rada of the Ukrainian SSR, said that Ukraine's acting Minister of Internal Affairs Vasyl Durdynets phoned her at work at 09:00 to report current affairs; only at the end of the conversation did he mention that there had been a fire at the Chernobyl nuclear power plant, adding that it was extinguished and everything was fine. When Shevchenko asked "How are the people?", he replied that there was nothing to be concerned about: "Some are celebrating a wedding, others are gardening, and others are fishing in the Pripyat River".

Shevchenko then spoke by telephone to Volodymyr Shcherbytsky, General Secretary of the Communist Party of Ukraine and de facto head of state, who said he anticipated a delegation of the state commission headed by Boris Shcherbina, the deputy chairman of the Council of Ministers of the USSR.

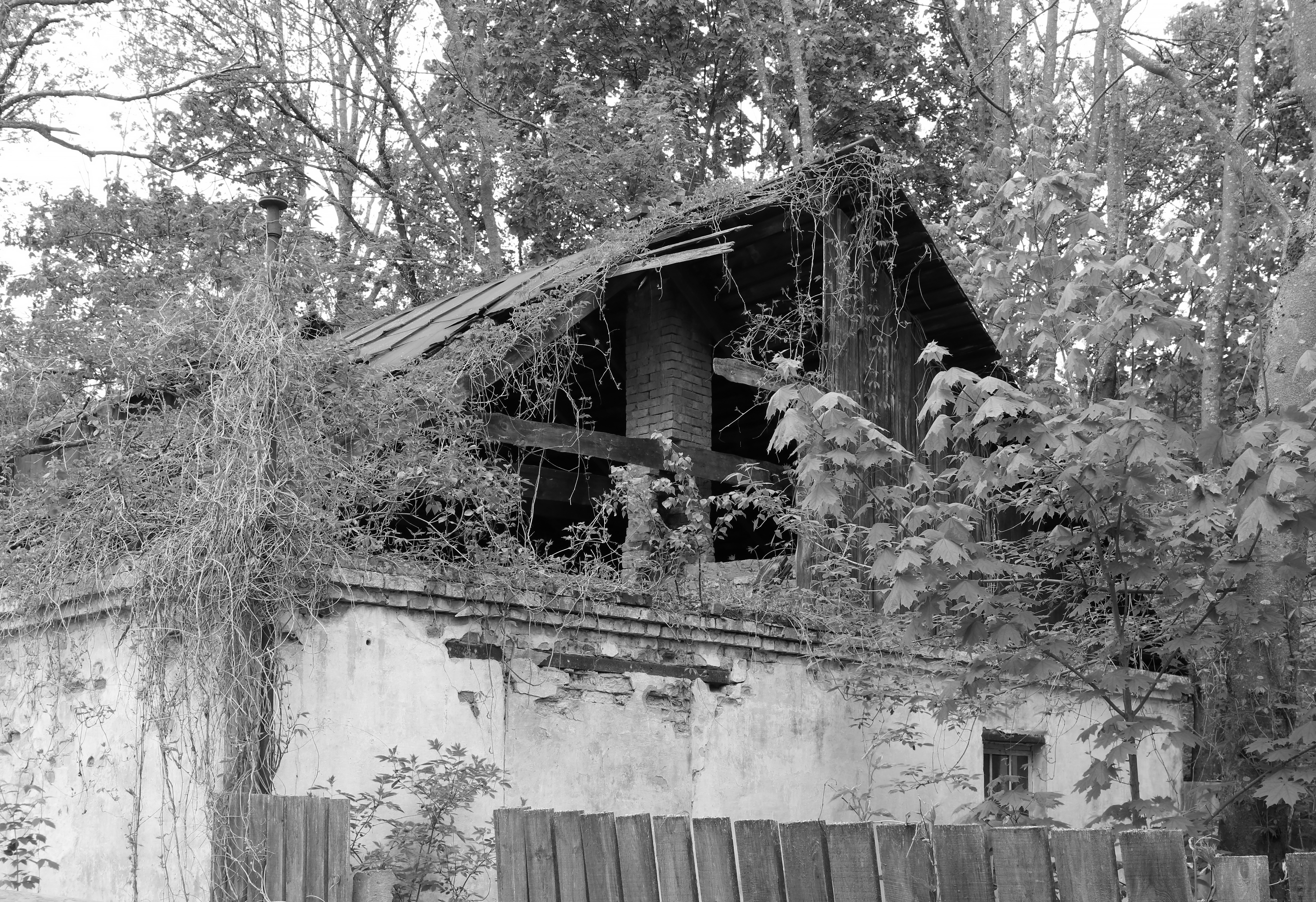
Ruins of abandoned house in Chernobyl, 2019

A commission was established later in the day to investigate the accident. It was headed by Valery Legasov, First Deputy Director of the Kurchatov Institute of Atomic Energy, and included leading nuclear specialist Evgeny Velikhov, hydro-meteorologist Yuri Izrael, radiologist Leonid Ilyin, and others. They flew to Boryspil International Airport and arrived at the power plant in the evening of 26 April. By that time two people had already died and 52 were hospitalized. The delegation soon had ample evidence that the reactor was destroyed and that extremely high levels of radiation had caused a number of cases of radiation exposure. In the early daylight hours of 27 April, they ordered the evacuation of Pripyat.

Pripyat evacuation broadcast
Russian language announcement

A translated excerpt of the evacuation announcement follows:

For the attention of the residents of Pripyat! The City Council informs you that due to the accident at Chernobyl Power Station in the city of Pripyat the radioactive conditions in the vicinity are deteriorating. The Communist Party, its officials and the armed forces are taking necessary steps to combat this. Nevertheless, with the view to keep people as safe and healthy as possible, the children being top priority, we need to temporarily evacuate the citizens in the nearest towns of Kiev region. For these reasons, starting from 27 April 1986, 14:00 each apartment block will be able to have a bus at its disposal, supervised by the police and the city officials. It is highly advisable to take your documents, some vital personal belongings and a certain amount of food, just in case, with you. The senior executives of public and industrial facilities of the city has decided on the list of employees needed to stay in Pripyat to maintain these facilities in a good working order. All the houses will be guarded by the police during the evacuation period. Comrades, leaving your residences temporarily please make sure you have turned off the lights, electrical equipment and water and shut the windows. Please keep calm and orderly in the process of this short-term evacuation.

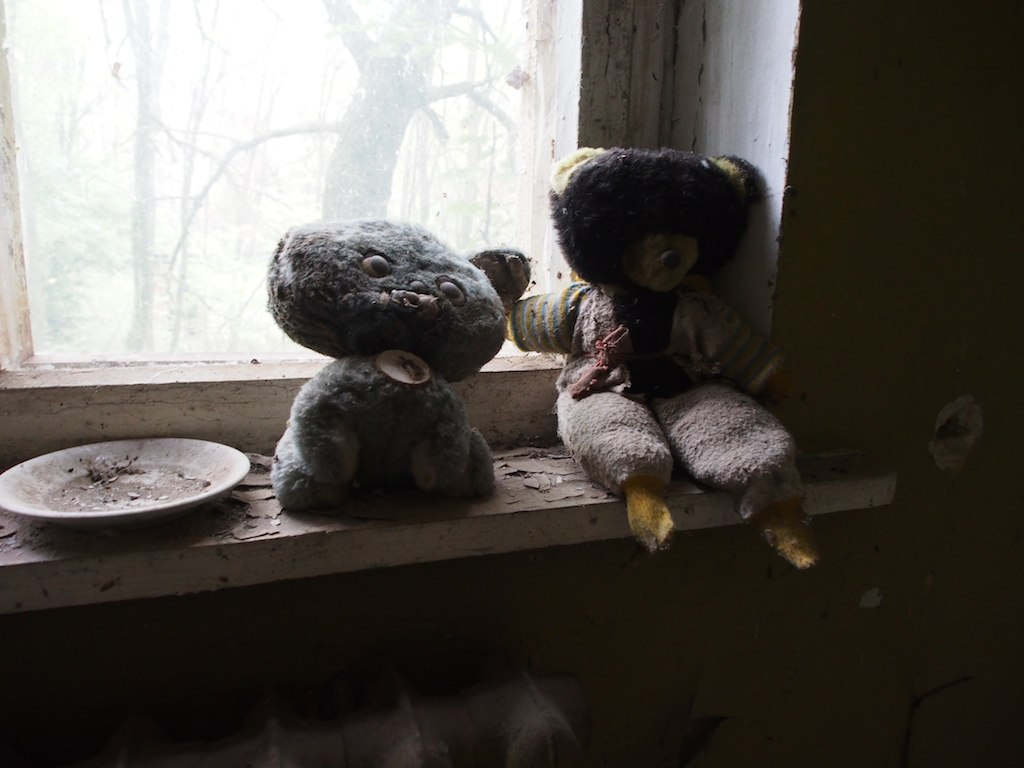
Abandoned objects in the evacuation zone

To expedite the evacuation, residents were told to bring only what was necessary, and that they would remain evacuated for approximately three days. As a result, most personal belongings were left behind, and residents were only allowed to recover certain items after months had passed. By 15:00, 53,000 people were evacuated to the Kiev region. The next day, talks began for evacuating people from the 10 km zone. Ten days after the accident, the evacuation area was expanded to 30 km. The Chernobyl exclusion zone has remained ever since, although its shape has changed and its size has expanded.

The surveying and detection of isolated fallout hotspots outside this zone over the following year eventually resulted in 135,000 long-term evacuees in total. The years between 1986 and 2000 saw the near tripling in the total number of permanently resettled persons from the most severely contaminated areas to approximately 350,000. A new city of Slavutych has been built across the Dnieper marshes to house Chernobyl Nuclear Power Plant employees instead of Pripyat, with a direct rail connection to the Chernobyl NPP.

=== Official announcement ===
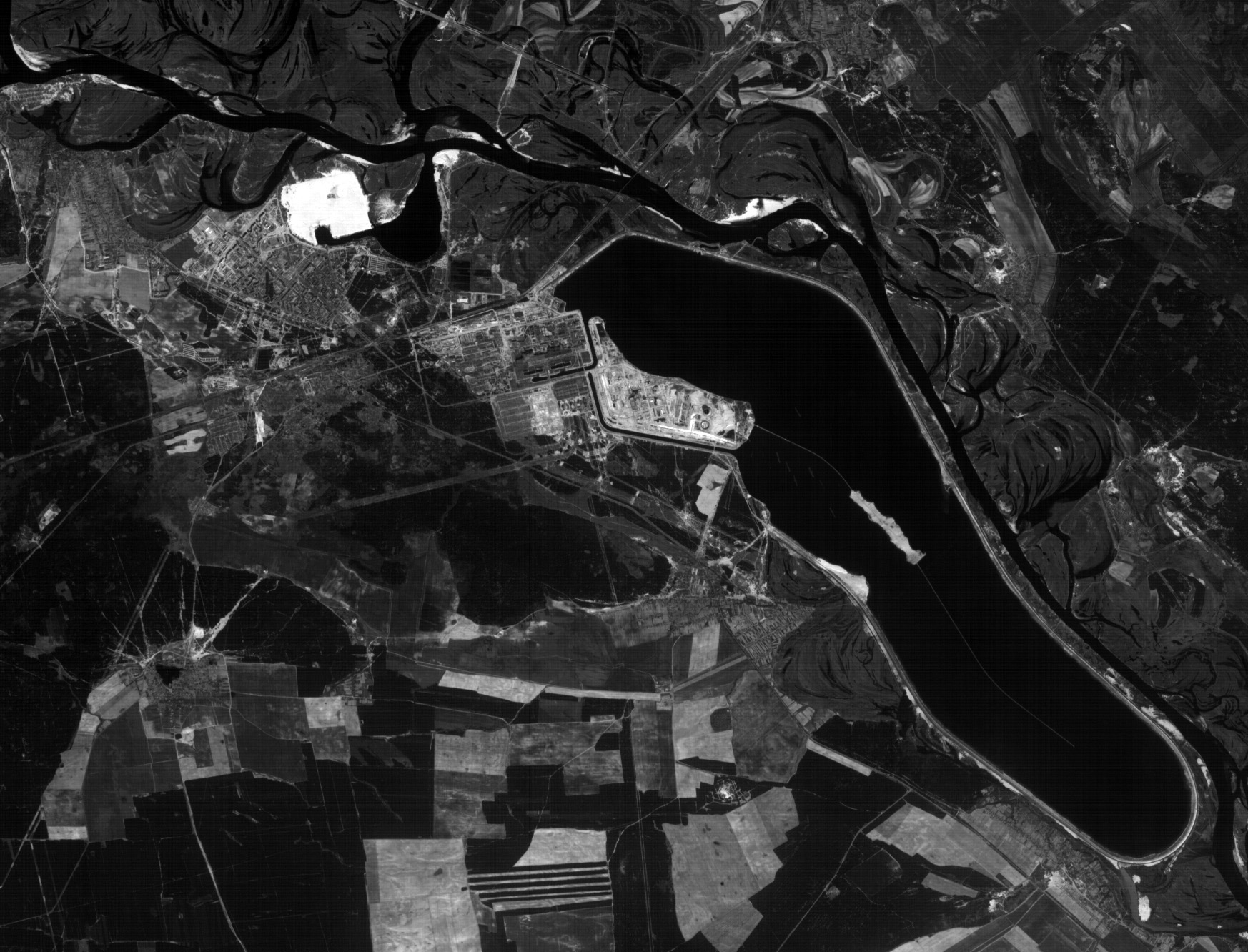
Picture taken by French satellite SPOT-1 on 1 May 1986

Evacuation began one and a half days before the accident was publicly acknowledged by the Soviet Union. On the morning of 28 April, radiation levels set off alarms at the Forsmark Nuclear Power Plant in Sweden, over 1,000 km from the Chernobyl Plant. Workers at Forsmark reported the case to the Swedish Radiation Safety Authority, which determined that the radiation had originated elsewhere. That day, the Swedish government contacted the Soviet government to inquire about whether there had been a nuclear accident in the Soviet Union. The Soviet authorities initially denied it. It was only after the Swedish government suggested they were about to file an official alert with the International Atomic Energy Agency that the Soviet government admitted that an accident had taken place at Chernobyl.

At first, the authorities conceded only that a minor accident had occurred, but once they began evacuating more than 100,000 people, the scale of the situation became widely known. At 21:02 the evening of 28 April, a 20-second announcement was read in the TV news programme Vremya: "There has been an accident at the Chernobyl Nuclear Power Plant. One of the nuclear reactors was damaged. The effects of the accident are being remedied. Assistance has been provided for any affected people. An investigative commission has been set up."

This was the first time the Soviet Union had officially announced a nuclear accident. The Telegraph Agency of the Soviet Union (TASS) then discussed the Three Mile Island accident and other American nuclear accidents, which Serge Schmemann of The New York Times wrote was an example of the common Soviet tactic of whataboutism. The mention of a commission also indicated to observers the seriousness of the incident, and subsequent state radio broadcasts were replaced with classical music, a common method of preparing the public for an announcement of a tragedy in the USSR.

Around the same time, ABC News released its report about the disaster. Shevchenko was the first of the Ukrainian state top officials to arrive at the disaster site early on 28 April. She returned home near midnight, stopping at a radiological checkpoint in Vilcha, one of the first that were set up soon after the accident.

There was a notification from Moscow that there was no reason to postpone the 1 May International Workers' Day celebrations in Kiev. On 30 April a meeting of the Political bureau of the Central Committee of the CPSU took place to discuss the plan for the celebration. Scientists were reporting that the radiological background level in Kiev was normal. It was decided to shorten celebrations from the regular three and a half to four hours to under two hours.

Several buildings in Pripyat were kept open to be used by workers still involved with the plant. These included the Jupiter factory and the Azure Swimming Pool, used by the Chernobyl liquidators for recreation during the clean-up.

=== Core meltdown risk mitigation ===
Chernobyl lava-like corium, formed by fuel-containing mass, flowed into the steam suppression region of the plant.

==== Bubbler pools ====
Two floors of bubbler pools beneath the reactor served as a large water reservoir for the emergency cooling pumps and as a pressure suppression system capable of condensing steam in case of a small broken steam pipe; the third floor above them, below the reactor, served as a steam tunnel. The steam released by a broken pipe was supposed to enter the steam tunnel and be led into the pools to bubble through a layer of water.

The smoldering steel, fuel, serpentinite and other material, at more than 1,200 °C (2,190°F), started to pool on the floor of the sub-reactor space, creating a mixture akin to corium, a radioactive semi-liquid material comparable to lava. It was feared that if this mixture travelled through the pipes into the pool of water, the resulting steam production would further contaminate the area or even cause another explosion, and that it would therefore be necessary to drain the pool. These fears ultimately proved unfounded, since corium began dripping harmlessly into the flooded bubbler pools before the water could be removed. The molten fuel hit the water and cooled into a light-brown ceramic pumice, whose low density allowed it to float.

Extremely high levels of radioactivity in the lava under the Chernobyl number four reactor in 1986

Unaware of this, the government commission directed that the bubbler pools be drained by opening its sluice gates. The valves controlling it, however, were located in a flooded corridor in a subterranean annex adjacent to the reactor building. Engineer Oleksiy Ananenko was originally chosen for the task, as he had worked on maintenance in these corridors many times before. Ananenko reported to his superior, Boris Baranov, who elected to go with him. Finally, they chose Valeri Bespalov to join them with a dosimeter. In waterproof clothing, equipped with only a flashlight and dosimeters, they navigated the dark, highly radioactive corridors toward the corridors where they were able to open all valves for the sluice gates. Numerous media reports falsely suggested that all three men died just days later. In fact, all three survived and were awarded the Order for Courage in May 2018.

Once the bubbler pool gates were opened, fire brigade pumps were then used to drain the basement. The operation was not completed until 8 May, after 20,000 tonnes of water were pumped out.

At Shcherbina's instructions, helicopter units of the Air Forces of the Kiev Military District were directed to seal the crippled reactor unit no. 4 with sand. Generál-leytenánt ("two stars") N.P. Kryukov and General-mayor ("one star") Nikolay Antoshkin, respectively the Commander and Chief of Staff of the Air Forces of the Kiev Military District, arrived at the plant in the early morning of 27 April.

==== Foundation protection measures ====
The government commission was concerned that the molten core would burn into the earth and contaminate groundwater. To reduce the likelihood of this, it was decided to freeze the earth beneath the reactor, which would also stabilize the foundations. Using oil-well drilling equipment, injection of liquid nitrogen began on 4 May. It was estimated that 25 tonnes of liquid nitrogen per day would be required to keep the soil frozen at -100 C. This idea was quickly scrapped.

As an alternative, subway builders and coal miners were deployed to excavate a tunnel below the reactor that would make room for a cooling system. The final makeshift design for the cooling system incorporated a coiled formation of pipes cooled with water, with a thin top cover of thermally-conductive graphite. The graphite layer would prevent the concrete above from melting, and was to be encapsulated between two concrete layers, each 1 m thick, for stabilisation. This graphite-concrete "sandwich" would be similar in concept to later core catchers now part of many nuclear reactor designs.

Following a drop in air temperatures, and reports that the fuel melt had stopped, both the graphite cooling plate and the prior nitrogen-injection proposal were abandoned. It was later determined that the fuel had flowed down three floors, with a few cubic meters coming to rest at ground level. The precautionary underground channel, with its active cooling, was deemed redundant; instead, the excavation was filled with concrete to strengthen the foundation below the reactor.

=== Area cleanup ===
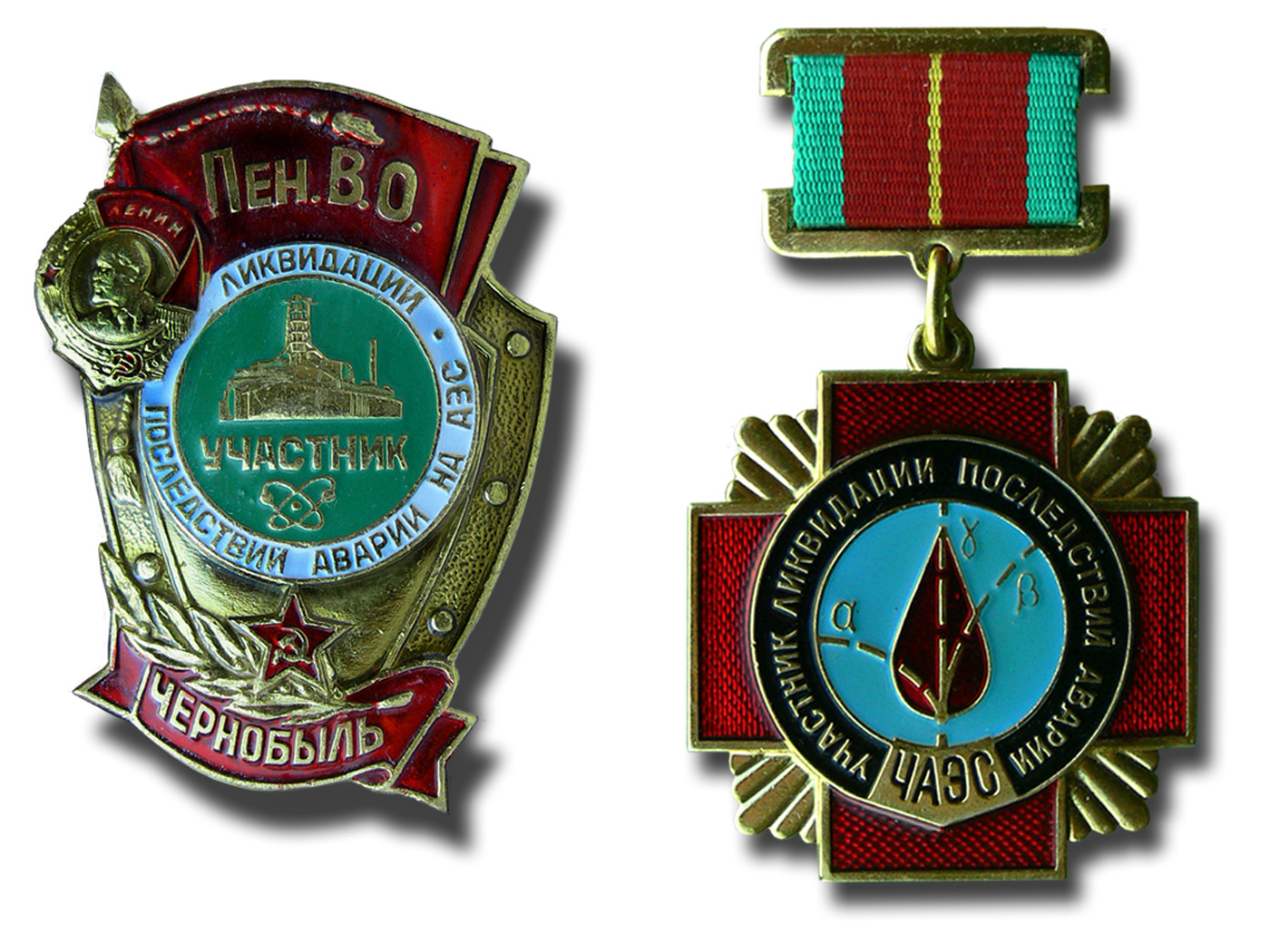
Soviet badge and medal awarded to Chernobyl liquidators

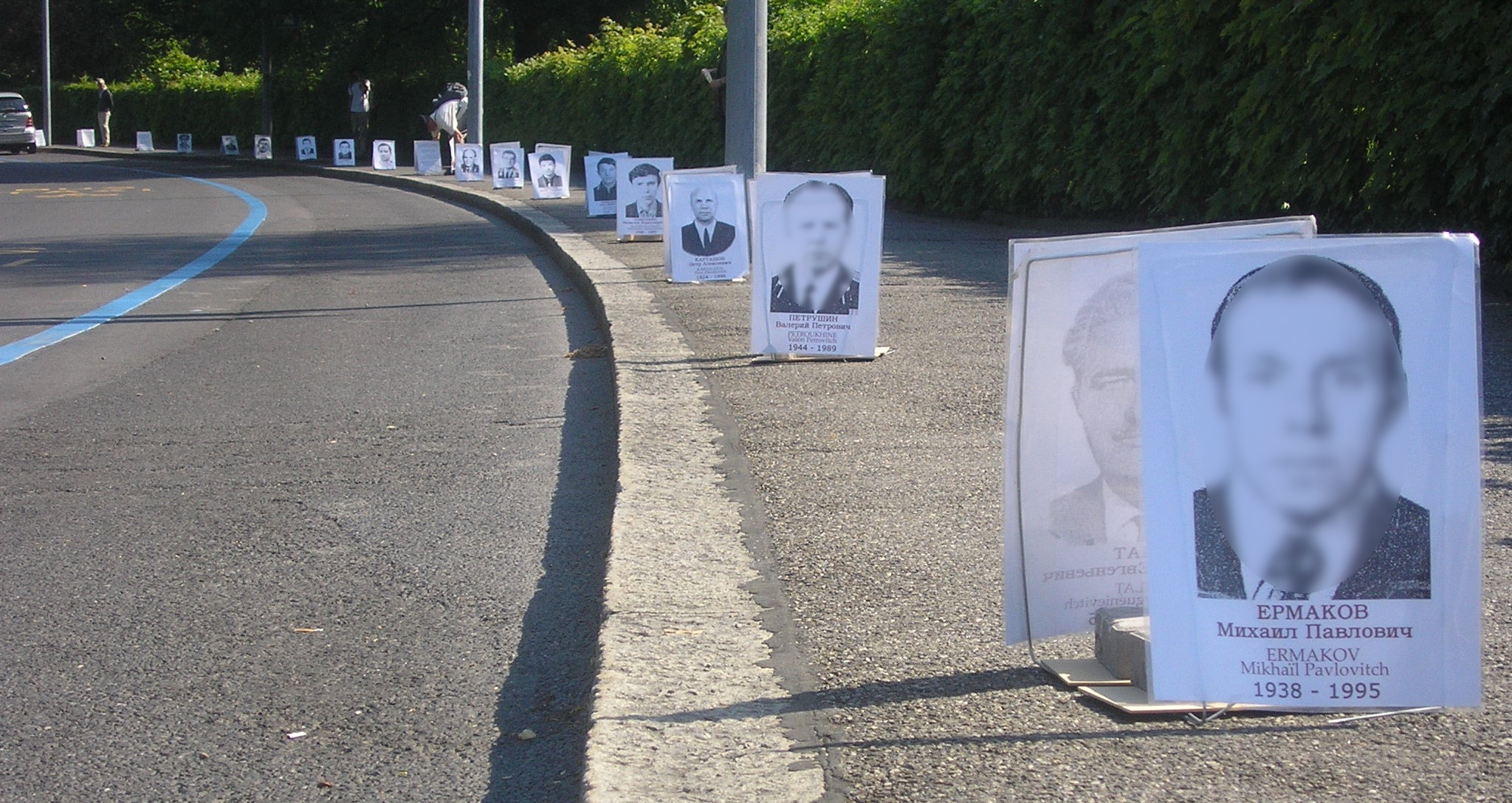
Portraits of deceased Chernobyl liquidators used for an anti-nuclear power protest in Geneva

The official contaminated zones saw a massive clean-up effort lasting seven months. The official reason for such early, and dangerous, decontamination efforts, rather than allowing time for natural decay, was that the land needed to be repopulated and brought back into cultivation. Within fifteen months, 75% of the land was under cultivation, even though only a third of the evacuated villages were resettled. Yet this land was of marginal agricultural value. According to David Marples, the administration wished to forestall panic regarding nuclear energy, and even to restart the power station.

Helicopters regularly sprayed large areas of contaminated land with "Barda", a sticky polymerizing fluid, designed to entrap radioactive dust. Although a number of radioactive emergency vehicles were buried in trenches, many of the vehicles used by the liquidators still remained, as of 2018, parked in a field in the Chernobyl area. Scavengers have removed many functioning parts, but they remain highly radioactive.

A unique "clean up" medal was given to the clean-up workers, known as "liquidators". Liquidators worked under poor conditions, uninformed and with little protection. Many of them exceeded radiation safety limits.

== Site cleanup and remediation ==
Questions arose about the future of the plant and its fate. All work on the unfinished reactors no. 5 and no. 6 was halted three years later. The damaged reactor was sealed off and 200 cubic metres of concrete was placed between the disaster site and the operational buildings. The Ukrainian government allowed the three remaining reactors to continue operating because of an energy shortage.

In October 1991, a fire occurred in the turbine building of reactor no. 2; the authorities subsequently declared the reactor damaged beyond repair, and it was taken offline. Reactor no. 1 was decommissioned in November 1996 as part of a deal between the Ukrainian government and international organizations such as the IAEA to end operations at the plant. On 15 December 2000, then-President Leonid Kuchma personally turned off reactor no. 3 in an official ceremony, shutting down the entire site.

=== Debris removal ===
In the months after the explosion, attention turned to removing the radioactive debris from the roof. While the worst of the debris had remained inside what was left of the reactor, an estimated 100 tonnes of debris on the roof had to be removed to enable the safe construction of the "sarcophagus"—a concrete structure that would entomb the reactor and inhibit release of radioactive dust. The initial plan was to use robots to clear the roof. Approximately 60 remote-controlled robots were involved, primarily designed for use in lunar exploration or policing work.

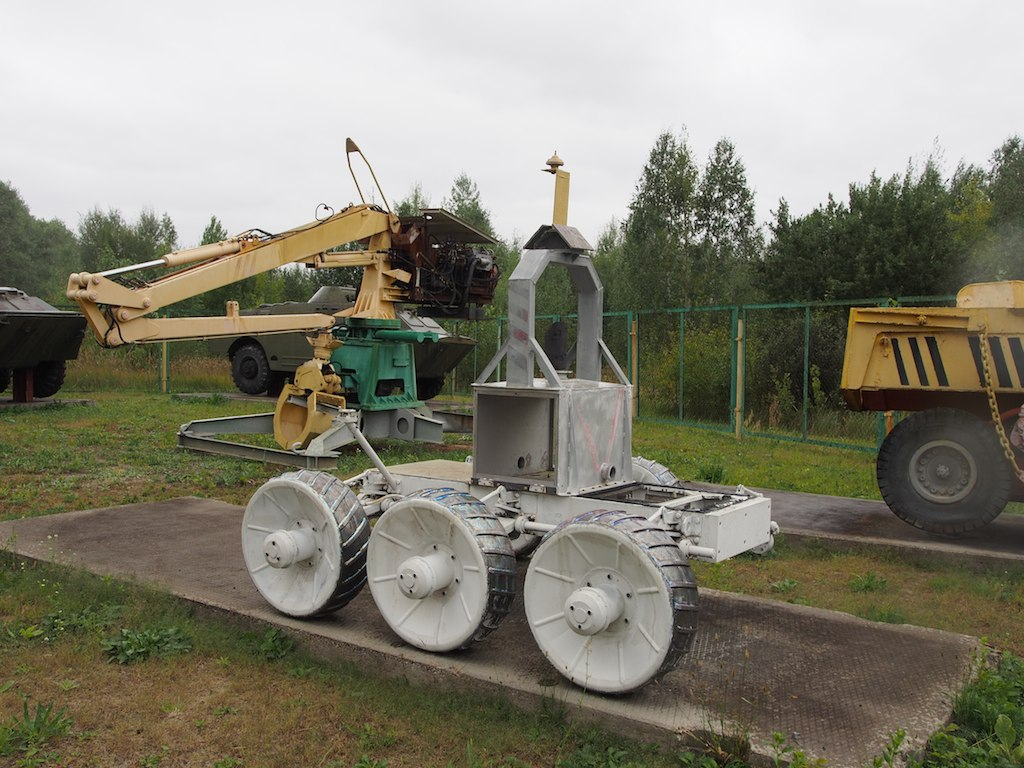
STR-1 robot used in cleanup, nicknamed "Moon Walker"

Many robots failed due to the difficult terrain, combined with the effect of high radiation fields on their batteries and electronic controls. In 1987, Valery Legasov, first deputy director of the Kurchatov Institute of Atomic Energy in Moscow, said: "We learned that robots are not the great remedy for everything. Where there was very high radiation, the robot ceased to be a robot—the electronics quit working."

Consequently, the most highly radioactive materials were shovelled by Chernobyl liquidators from the military, wearing protective gear. These soldiers could only spend a maximum of 40–90 seconds working on the rooftops of the surrounding buildings because of the extremely high radiation levels. Only 10% of the debris cleared from the roof was performed by robots; the other 90% was removed by 3,828 men who each received, on average, an estimated dose of 25 rem (250 mSv) of radiation.

=== Construction of the sarcophagus ===
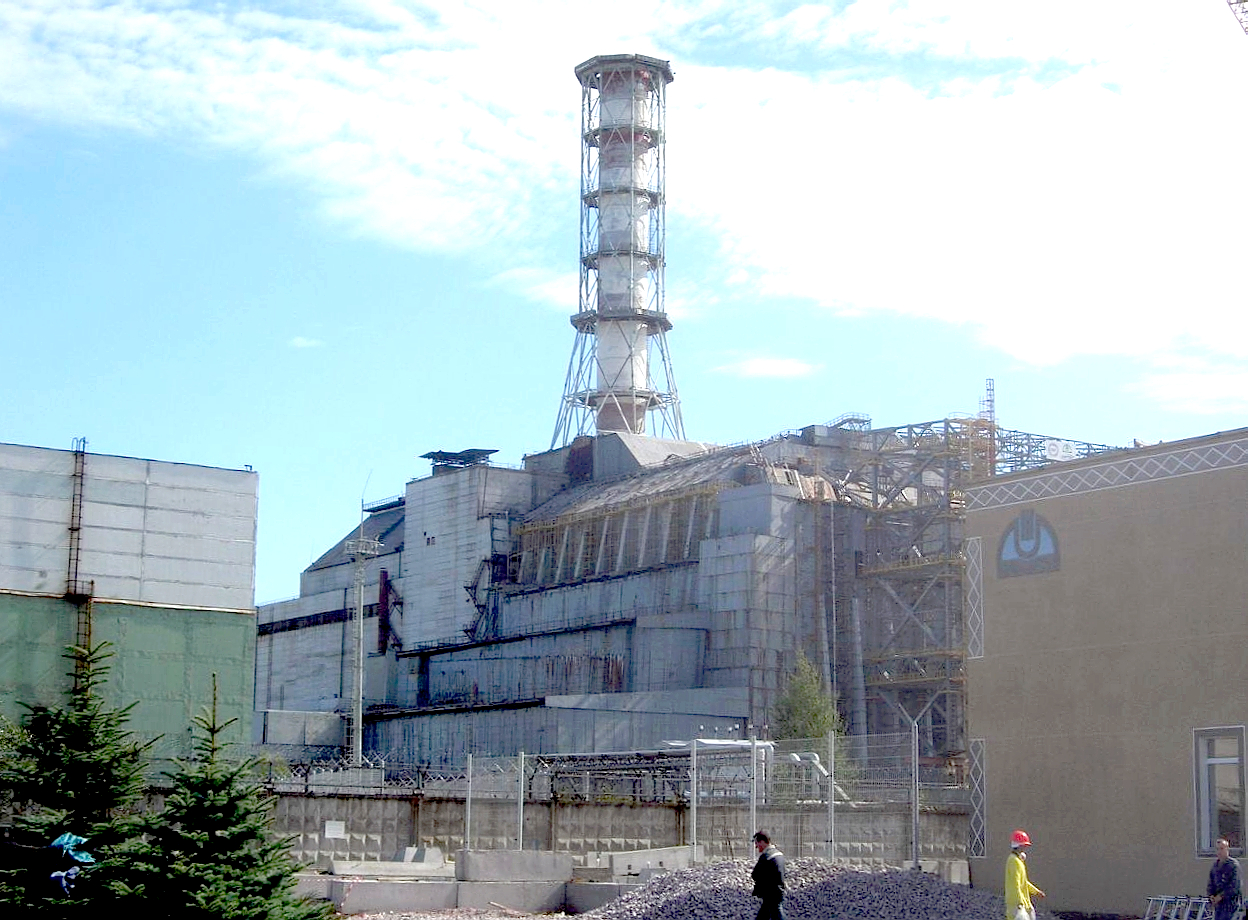
No.4 reactor site in 2006 showing the sarcophagus containment structure; reactor no.3 is to the left of the smoke stack

With the open-air reactor fire extinguished, the next step was to prevent the spread of contamination due to wind or birds. In addition, rainwater could wash contamination into the sub-surface water table, where it could migrate outside the site. Rainwater falling on the wreckage could also accelerate corrosion of steelwork in the remaining reactor structure. A further challenge was to reduce the large amount of emitted gamma radiation, which was a hazard to the workforce operating adjacent reactor no. 3.

The chosen solution was to enclose the wrecked reactor within a huge composite steel and concrete shelter, which became known as the "Sarcophagus". It had to be constructed quickly, and within the constraint of high-level ambient gamma radiation. The design started on 20 May 1986, 24 days after the disaster; construction was from June to late November.

The construction workers had to be protected from radiation; techniques such as crane drivers working from lead-lined control cabins were employed. The construction work included erecting walls around the perimeter, clearing and surface-concreting the surrounding ground to remove sources of radiation and to allow access for large construction machinery, constructing a thick radiation-shielding wall to protect the workers in reactor no. 3, fabricating a high-rise buttress to strengthen parts of the old structure, constructing an overall roof, and provisioning a ventilation-extraction system to capture airborne contamination within the shelter.

=== Investigations of the reactor condition ===
From May 5, 1986, workers from NIKIET and the V. G. Khlopin Radium Institute collaborated under the name Field Integrated Scientific and Technical Brigade No. 9 (PKNTB-9) to work at the Chernobyl Nuclear Power Plant, led by G. S. Sinitsyna and S. S. Kovalenko. Their job was to conduct dosimetric surveys of Unit 3, Unit 4, the vent block, and the deaerator block, as well as assessing the damage and finding nuclear fuel.

They ultimately did not get very far, however. They were only able to provide dosimetric measurements down to the floor on +12.5, where they were unable to go any further down due to extreme radiation levels. These radiation levels were later found to be caused by corium on the +9.0 level, as part of the horizontal flow. Their efforts would also be hampered by an electrical fire on May 23.

Following several models by Oleksandr Borovoi and Valery Legasov, they determined that 90% of the nuclear fuel remained inside the building. Now, needing to locate where exactly, members of the Kurchatov Institute came to Chernobyl on June 6, led by Konstantin Checherov, and began attempting to find routes into these high radiation areas. As previously assessed, they could not get to these lower levels from +12.5 due to extreme radiation levels coming from staircase 257. On June 10, Konstantin Checherov measured a radiation level of 11,400 roentgens per hour inside an open hatch within the Southern Main Circulation Pump Hall. This radiation would later be assessed to also be caused by corium.

Around June 15, Mikhail Kostyakov and Vladimir Kabanov were attempting to access the lower levels from the southern side. From corridor 017/2 on +0.0, they began to ascend a staircase leading to corridor 217/2 on +6.0. However, during this ascent, their dosimeter failed and broke, so they turned back. They did not know it, but they had just been the first people to come across the Elephant's Foot.

Following the start of the construction of the Sarcophagus, all expedition work had to be stopped, as concrete was being actively poured into the buildings. It would not be until after the Sarcophagus was complete - in November - that work could begin.

In this time, Konstantin Checherov alongside several figures such as Oleksandr Borovoy formed the "Complex Expedition". Their job was to assess the condition of the building and also locate the fuel and determine if it could go critical again. It was a major concern among the Complex Expedition regarding the composition of the molten fuel, as if the molten fuel contained enough fuel and a moderator, in theory it could create more damage to the building, or even another explosion.

The work began once again in late November 1986, as the Complex Expedition began work to assess the damage, while members of the Khoplin Radium Institute collected any fuel rods they found and took them back to their laboratory.

In December 1986, after months of investigation, Vasya Koryagin accidentally found a large object that appeared to be molten lead that had dropped into the reactor core and melted. The mass was called "The Elephant's Foot" for its wrinkled appearance. Only following samples being obtained were they able to assess that it was composed of melted sand, concrete, and a large amount of nuclear fuel that had escaped from the reactor. The concrete beneath the reactor was steaming hot, and was breached by now-solidified lava and spectacular unknown crystalline forms termed chernobylite. It was concluded that there was no further risk of explosion.

=== No. 4 reactor confinement ===
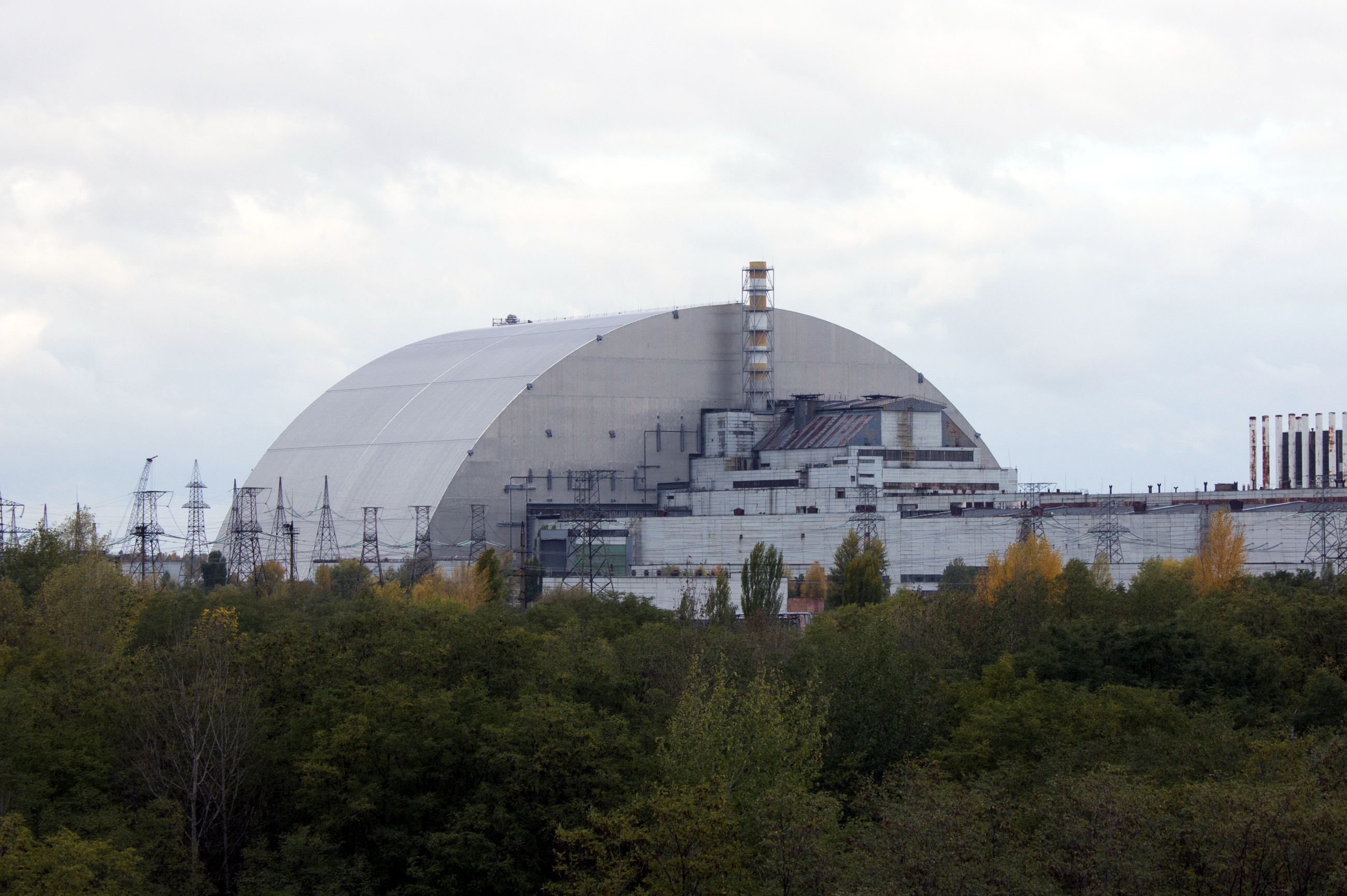
Chernobyl New Safe Confinement in 2017

The concrete sarcophagus which had been built in the months after the accident was never intended to last very long, with an expected lifespan of only 30 years. On 12 February 2013, a 600 square metre section of the roof of the turbine-building collapsed, adjacent to the sarcophagus, causing a new release of radioactivity. At first, it was assumed that this was due to the weight of snow; however, the quantity of snow was not exceptional, and the report of a Ukrainian fact-finding panel concluded that the collapse was the result of sloppy repair work and aging of the structure. Experts warned the sarcophagus itself was on the verge of collapse.

In 1997, the international Chernobyl Shelter Fund was founded to design and build a more permanent cover for the unstable sarcophagus. It received €864 million from international donors in 2011 and was managed by the European Bank for Reconstruction and Development. The new shelter was named the New Safe Confinement (NSC), and construction began in 2010. It consisted of a metal arch 105 m (344 ft) high and spanning 257 m (843 ft), built on rails adjacent to the reactor no. 4 building so that it could be slid over the top of the existing sarcophagus. The shelter was completed in 2016 and was moved into place over the sarcophagus on 29 November.

In February 2025, a Russian drone struck the shelter causing a fire, damaging the outer and inner protective covering of the NSC, and insulating layers inside. In December 2025 the IAEA said that the drone strike meant that the structure could no longer perform its main safety function. IAEA Director General Rafael Grossi stated that an IAEA mission in late November "confirmed that the [protective structure] had lost its primary safety functions, including the confinement capability, but also found that there was no permanent damage to its load-bearing structures or monitoring systems".

=== Waste management ===
Used fuel from units 1–3 was stored in the units' cooling ponds, and in an interim spent fuel storage facility pond, ISF-1, which now holds most of the spent fuel from units 1–3, allowing those reactors to be decommissioned under less restrictive conditions. Approximately 50 of the fuel assemblies from units 1 and 2 were damaged and required special handling. Moving fuel to ISF-1 was carried out in three stages: fuel from unit 3 was moved first, then all undamaged fuel from units 1 and 2, and finally the damaged fuel from units 1 and 2. Fuel transfers to ISF-1 were completed in June 2016.

A need was recognised for larger, longer-term radioactive waste management at the site, and a new facility designated ISF-2 was designed. This serves as dry storage for used fuel assemblies from units 1–3 and other operational wastes, as well as material from decommissioning units 1–3. A contract was signed in 1999 with Areva NP (Framatome) for construction of ISF-2. In 2003, after a significant part of the storage structures had been built, technical deficiencies in the design concept became apparent. In 2007, Areva withdrew and Holtec International was contracted for a new design and construction of ISF-2. The new design was approved in 2010, work started in 2011, and construction was completed in August 2017.

ISF-2 is the world's largest nuclear fuel storage facility, expected to hold more than 21,000 fuel assemblies for at least 100 years. The project includes a processing facility able to cut the fuel assemblies and to place the material in canisters, to be filled with inert gas and welded shut. The canisters are then to be transported to dry storage vaults, where the fuel containers will be enclosed for up to 100 years. Expected processing capacity is 2,500 fuel assemblies per year.

==== Fuel-containing materials ====
The radioactive material consists of core fragments, dust, and lava-like "fuel containing materials" (FCM)—also called "corium"—that flowed through the wrecked reactor building before hardening into a ceramic form.

Three different lavas are present in the basement of the reactor building: black, brown, and a porous ceramic. The lava materials are silicate glasses with inclusions of other materials within them. The porous lava is brown lava that dropped into water and thus cooled rapidly. It is unclear how long the ceramic form will retard the release of radioactivity. From 1997 to 2002, a series of published papers suggested that the self-irradiation of the lava would convert all 1200 tonnes into a submicrometre and mobile powder within a few weeks.

According to a published paper, degradation of the lava is likely to be a slow, gradual process. The same paper states that the loss of uranium from the wrecked reactor is only 10 kg per year; this low rate of uranium leaching suggests that the lava is resisting its environment. The paper also states that when the shelter is improved, the leaching rate of the lava will decrease. As of 2021, some fuel had already degraded significantly. The 'elephant's foot', which originally was so hard that it required the use of an armour piercing AK-47 round to remove a chunk, had softened to a texture similar to sand.

Before the completion of the New Safe Confinement building, rainwater acted as a neutron moderator, triggering increased fission in the remaining materials, risking criticality. Gadolinium nitrate solution was used to quench neutrons to slow the fission. Even after completion of the building, fission reactions may have increased. While neutron activity has declined across most of the destroyed fuel, from 2017 until late 2020 a doubling in neutron density was recorded in the sub-reactor space, before levelling off in early 2021. This indicated increasing levels of fission as water levels dropped, the opposite of what had been expected, and atypical compared to other fuel-containing areas. The fluctuations have led to fears that a self-sustaining reaction could be created, which would likely spread more radioactive dust and debris throughout the New Safe Confinement, making future cleanup even more difficult. Potential solutions include using a robot to drill into the fuel and insert boron carbide control rods. In early 2021, a ChNPP press release stated that the observed increase in neutron densities had levelled off since the beginning of that year.

=== Exclusion zone and recovery ===
Map of the Exclusion Zone

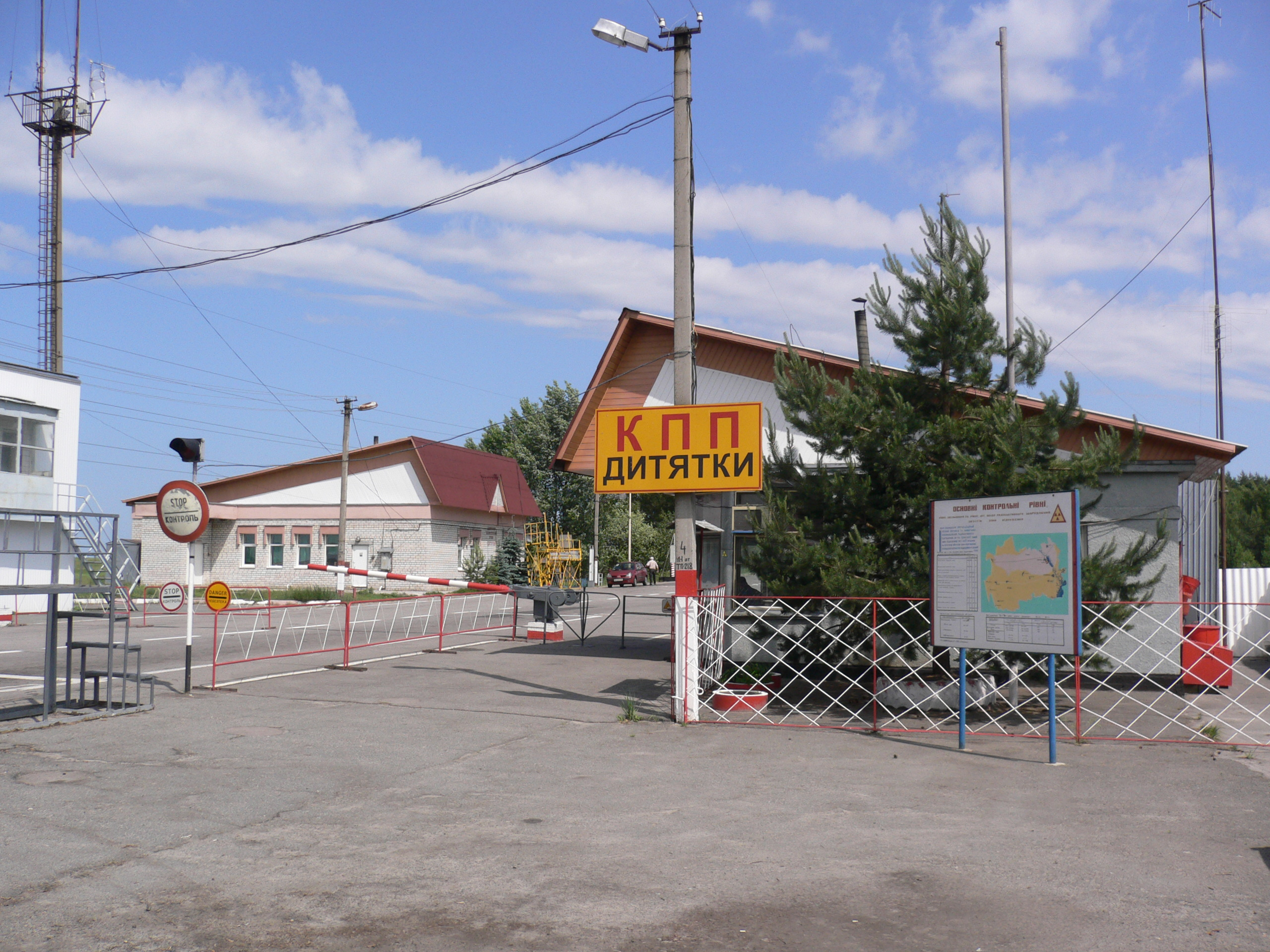
The entrance to the zone of alienation around Chernobyl

The Exclusion Zone was originally an area with a radius of 30 km in all directions from the plant, but was subsequently greatly enlarged to include an area measuring approximately 2600 square km, officially called the "zone of alienation". The area has largely reverted to forest and was overrun by wildlife due to the lack of human competition for space and resources.

Mass media sources have provided generalized estimates for when the Zone could be considered habitable again. These informal estimates have ranged from approximately 300 years to multiples of 20,000 years, referring to the half-life of plutonium-239, which contaminates the central portion of the Zone.

In the years following the disaster, residents known as samosely illegally returned to their abandoned homes. Most people are retired and survive mainly from farming and packages delivered by visitors. As of 2016, 187 locals had returned to the zone and were living permanently there.

In 2011, Ukraine opened the sealed zone around the Chernobyl reactor to tourists.

=== Forest fire concerns ===
During the dry season, forest fires are a perennial concern in areas contaminated by radioactive material. Dry conditions and build-up of debris make the forests a ripe breeding ground for wildfires. Depending on prevailing atmospheric conditions, smoke from wildfires could potentially spread more radioactive material outside the exclusion zone.

In April 2020, forest fires spread through 20,000 ha of the exclusion zone, causing increased radiation from the release of caesium-137 and strontium-90 from the ground and biomass. The increase in radioactivity was detectable by the monitoring network but did not pose a threat to human health. The average radiation dose that Kyiv residents received as a result of the fires was estimated to be 1 nSv.

=== Recovery projects ===
The Chernobyl Trust Fund was created in 1991 by the United Nations to help victims of the Chernobyl accident. It is administered by the United Nations Office for the Coordination of Humanitarian Affairs, which also manages strategy formulation, resource mobilization, and advocacy efforts. Beginning in 2002, under the United Nations Development Programme, the fund shifted its focus from emergency assistance to long-term development.

The Chernobyl Shelter Fund was established in 1997 at the G8 summit in Denver to finance the Shelter Implementation Plan (SIP). The plan called for transforming the site into an ecologically safe condition through stabilization of the sarcophagus and construction of the New Safe Confinement structure. While the original cost estimate for the SIP was US$768 million, the 2006 estimate was $1.2 billion.

In 2003, the United Nations Development Programme launched the Chernobyl Recovery and Development Programme (CRDP) for the recovery of affected areas. The programme was initiated in February 2002 based on the recommendations in the report on Human Consequences of the Chernobyl Nuclear Accident. The main goal of the CRDP was to support the Government of Ukraine in mitigating the long-term social, economic, and ecological consequences of the Chernobyl catastrophe. CRDP works in the four most affected Ukrainian areas: Kyivska, Zhytomyrska, Chernihivska and Rivnenska.

More than 18,000 Ukrainian children affected by the disaster have been treated in the resort town of Tarará, Cuba, since 1990.

The International Programme on the Health Effects of the Chernobyl Accident was created and received US$20 million, mainly from Japan, in the hope of discovering the main cause of health problems due to iodine-131 radiation. These funds were divided among Ukraine, Belarus, and Russia for the investigation of health effects.

=== Tourism ===
The first limited guided tours began in 2002. The 2007 release of the video game S.T.A.L.K.E.R. increased the site's popularity, and tour operators estimated that 40,000 tourists visited the site between 2007 and 2017. Between 2017 and 2022, over 350,000 tourists visited the site, hitting the maximum peak of almost 125,000 visitors in 2019, coinciding with the release of HBO's mini-series about the disaster. After its release in July 2019, Ukrainian president Volodymyr Zelenskyy announced that the Chernobyl site would become an official tourist attraction. Zelenskyy said, "We must give this territory of Ukraine a new life." Dr. T. Steen, a microbiology and immunology teacher at Georgetown's School of Medicine, recommends that tourists wear clothes and shoes they are comfortable throwing away and to avoid plant life. Tourism rebounded after COVID in 2021, but the Russian invasion of Ukraine in early 2022 and fighting in the surrounding area forced it to be closed to all visitors. The zone remains closed to tourists as of April 2026.

A parallel "stalker" subculture developed of illegal visitors roaming the area for prolonged periods, with some hiking into the zone over 100 times. These visitors are noted as often failing to take appropriate precautions against radiation.

== Effects ==
Estimated number of deaths from the disaster

The disaster released radioactive materials that were dispersed by wind over Ukraine, Belarus, Russia, and much of Europe. Chernobyl is estimated to have released about 400 times more radioactive material than the atomic bombings of Hiroshima and Nagasaki combined, contaminating roughly 100,000 square kilometres of land, mostly in Belarus, Ukraine, and Russia. The forest immediately downwind of the plant, since known as the Red Forest, was killed outright by acute radiation exposure.

The only deaths unambiguously and directly attributed to the disaster are among plant workers and emergency responders: two engineers killed by the explosions, and 28 more who died of acute radiation syndrome within three months. Health effects on the wider population remain contested. The most widely cited estimate, published by the Chernobyl Forum in 2005, projects up to 4,000 eventual deaths among the roughly 600,000 people who received the highest doses, alongside about 6,000 documented cases of thyroid cancer, of which around 15 had proved fatal by 2011, in people who were children or adolescents at the time. Other assessments, using different methodologies and covering wider populations, range from a few thousand to tens of thousands of eventual cancer deaths; a small number of studies propose figures in the hundreds of thousands, though these have been widely disputed on methodological grounds.

The disaster is estimated to have cost between US$235 billion and US$700 billion, among the most expensive disasters in history, and contributed to the economic strain that hastened the dissolution of the Soviet Union. It also reshaped nuclear energy policy worldwide, slowing new reactor construction, prompting international safety treaties such as the Convention on Early Notification of a Nuclear Accident, and strengthening anti-nuclear movements in several European countries.

== Legacy and significance ==
=== Nuclear debate ===
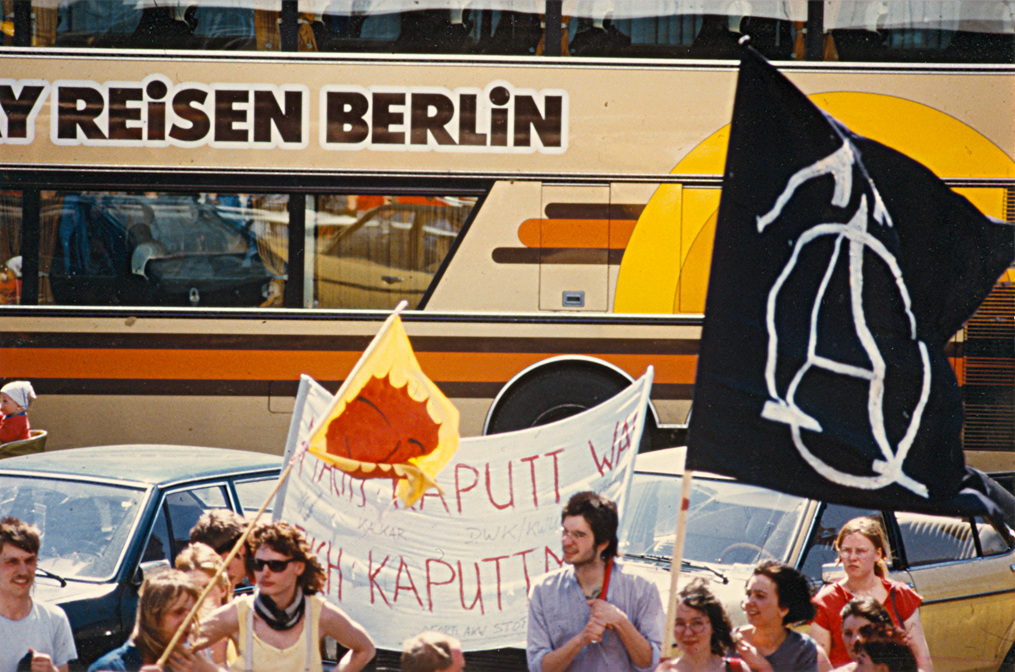
Anti-nuclear protest after the Chernobyl disaster on May Day, 1986 in West Berlin

Because of the distrust many had in the Soviet authorities, who engaged in a cover-up, a great deal of debate about the situation occurred in the First World during the early days of the event. Journalists mistrusted many professionals, and in turn encouraged the public to mistrust them as well.

The accident raised already heightened concerns about fission reactors worldwide, and while most concern was focused on those of the same unusual design, hundreds of disparate nuclear reactor proposals, including those under construction at Chernobyl, reactors numbers 5 and 6, were eventually cancelled. With ballooning costs as a result of new nuclear reactor safety system standards and the legal and political costs in dealing with the increasingly hostile/anxious public opinion, there was a precipitous drop in the rate of new reactor construction after 1986.

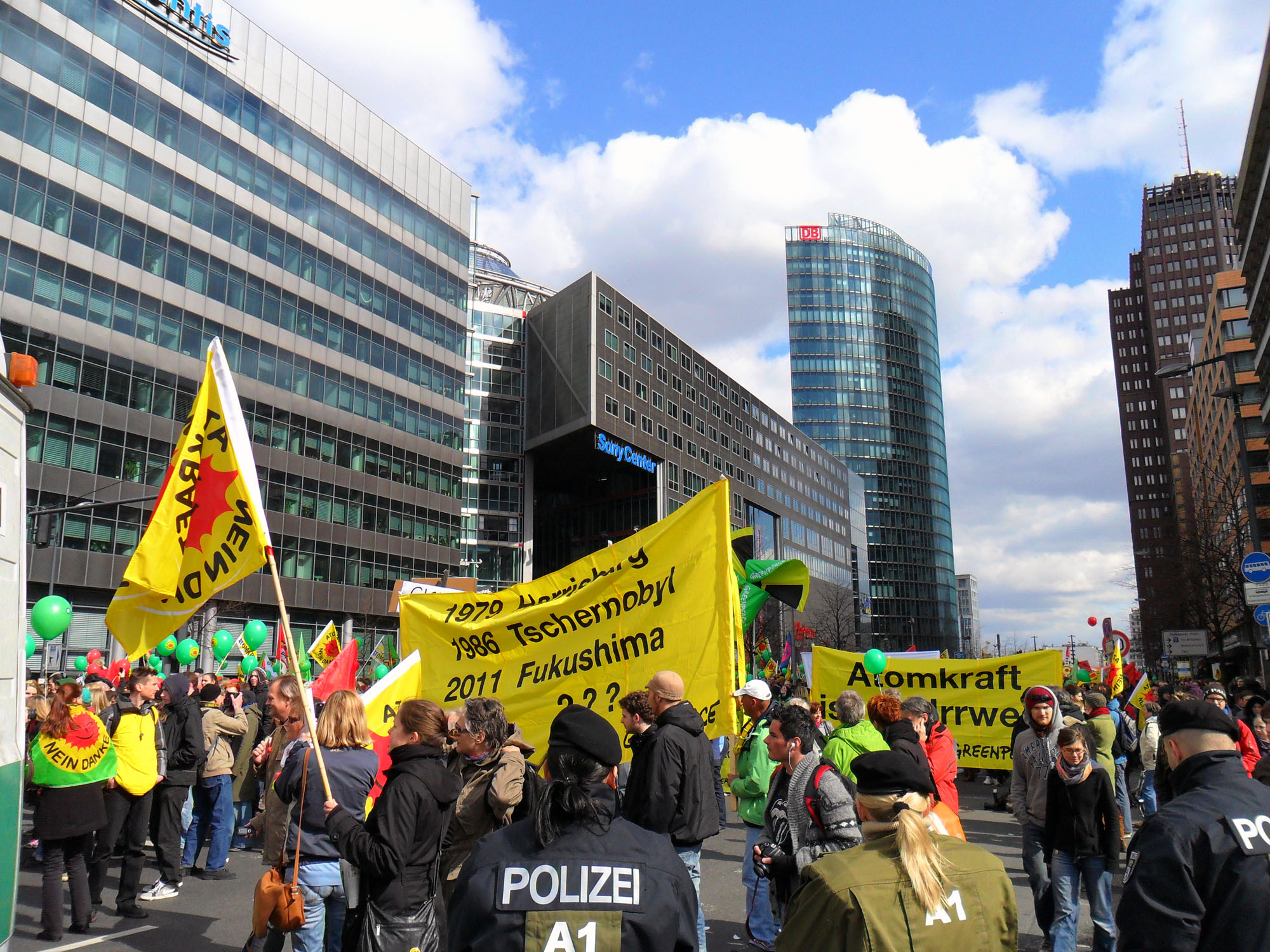
Nuclear power protest in Berlin, 2011

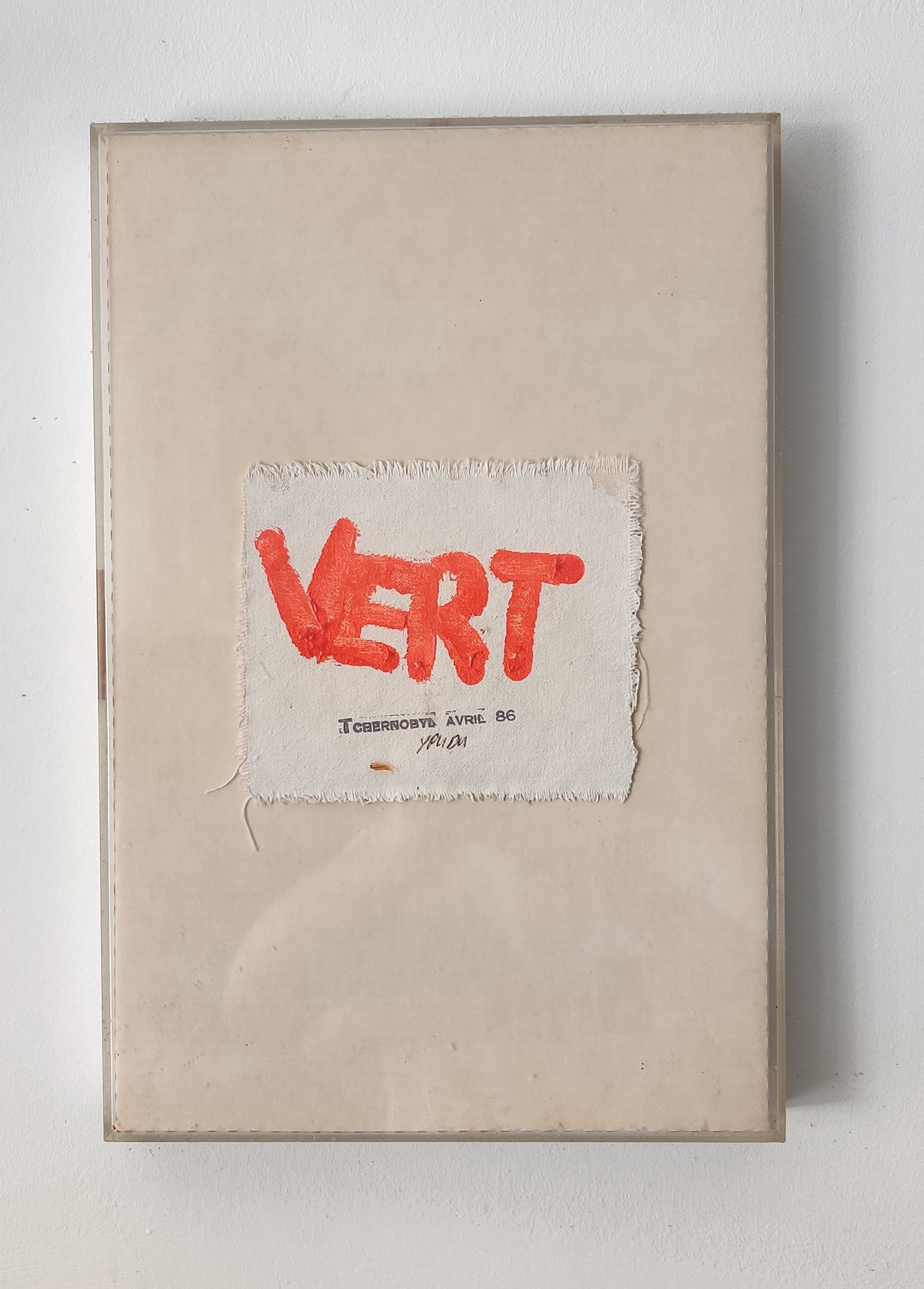
After Chernobyl, nuclear debate became a topic in galleries and exhibitions. Artwork by French-American Jean Dupuy in 1986 dedicated to Chernobyl disaster.

The accident also raised concerns about the cavalier safety culture in the Soviet nuclear power industry, slowing industry growth and forcing the Soviet government to become less secretive about its operating procedures. (Note: "No one believed the first newspaper reports, which patently understated the scale of the catastrophe and often contradicted one another. The confidence of readers was re-established only after the press was allowed to examine the events in detail without the original censorship restrictions. The policy of openness (glasnost) and 'uncompromising criticism' of outmoded arrangements had been proclaimed at the 27th Congress (of the Communist Party of Soviet Union), but it was only in the tragic days following the Chernobyl disaster that glasnost began to change from an official slogan into an everyday practice. The truth about Chernobyl that eventually hit the newspapers opened the way to a more truthful examination of other social problems. More and more articles were written about drug abuse, crime, corruption and the mistakes of leaders of various ranks. A wave of 'bad news' swept over the readers in 1986–87, shaking the consciousness of society. Many were horrified to find out about the numerous calamities of which they had previously had no idea. It often seemed to people that there were many more outrages in the epoch of perestroika than before although, in fact, they had simply not been informed about them previously." Kagarlitsky 1989, pp. 333–334.) The government cover-up of the Chernobyl disaster was a catalyst for glasnost, which "paved the way for reforms leading to the Soviet collapse." Numerous structural and construction quality issues, as well as deviations from the original plant design, had been known to the KGB since at least 1973 and passed on to the Central Committee, which took no action and classified the information.

In Italy, political fallout from the Chernobyl accident was reflected in the outcome of the 1987 nuclear power referendum. As a result, Italy began phasing out its nuclear power plants in 1988, a decision that was effectively reversed in 2008. A 2011 referendum reiterated Italians' objections to nuclear power, thus abrogating the government's 2008 decision.

In Germany, the Chernobyl accident led to the creation of a federal environment ministry. The German environmental minister was given authority over reactor safety as well, a responsibility the minister still holds today. The Chernobyl disaster is also credited with strengthening the anti-nuclear movement in Germany, which culminated in the decision to end the use of nuclear power made by the 1998–2005 Schröder government. A temporary reversal of this policy ended with the Fukushima nuclear disaster.

In direct response to the Chernobyl disaster, a conference to create a Convention on Early Notification of a Nuclear Accident was called in 1986 by the International Atomic Energy Agency. The resulting treaty has bound members to provide notification of any nuclear and radiation accidents that occur that could affect other states, along with the Convention on Assistance in the Case of a Nuclear Accident or Radiological Emergency.

Chernobyl has been used as a case study in research concerning the root causes of such disasters, such as sleep deprivation and mismanagement.

The State Archives of Ukraine hold an archival collection of around 1,000 declassified documents relating to the construction of the power station, the disaster, and its aftermath extending to the early 2000s. This archive was added by UNESCO to its Memory of the World International Register in 2017, recognising it as documentary heritage of global importance.

=== International response ===
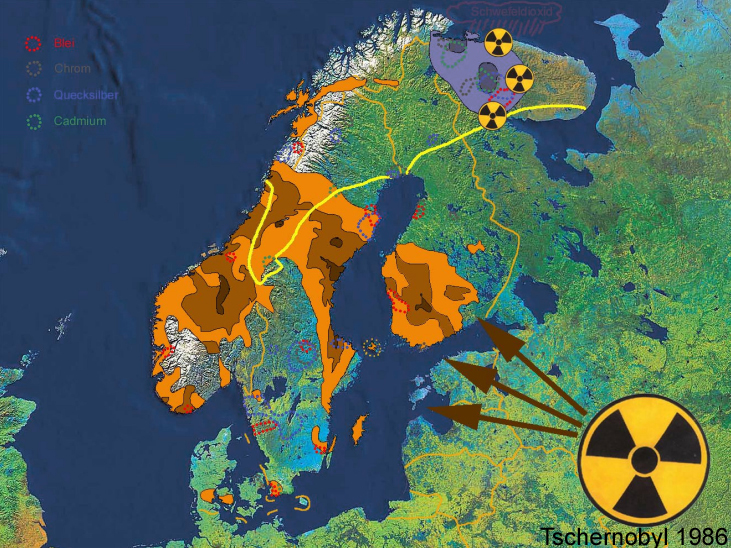
Chernobyl fallout in Scandinavia

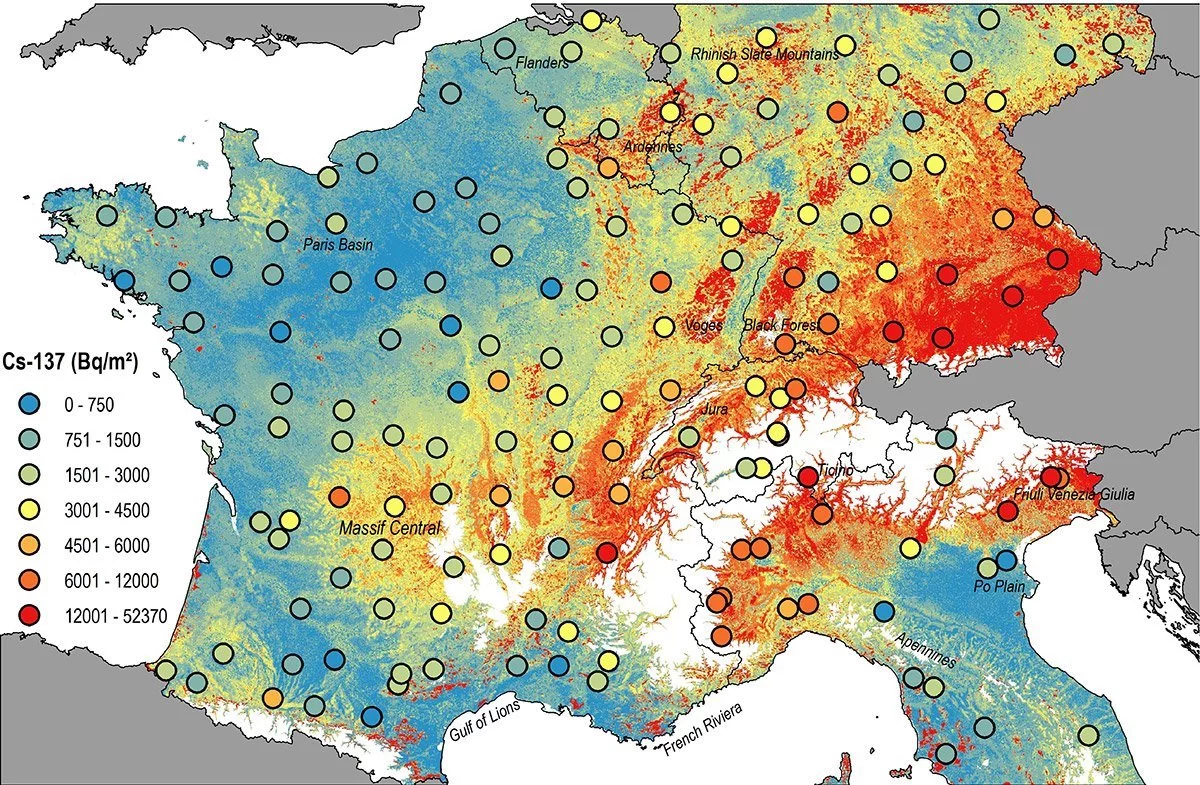
Caesium-137 in Western European soil, from the Chernobyl disaster and its deposition through the weather

After the Chernobyl Disaster, a number of countries were reluctant to expand their nuclear programs. Italy and Switzerland tried to ban nuclear power altogether. Other countries, such as the Netherlands and Finland postponed the addition of nuclear power plants. The disaster reaffirmed policy made by Austria and Sweden to terminate use of all nuclear energy. Germany set up regulatory organizations and new policy including the Federal Ministry of Environment and Reactor Safety and a new act for precaution protection against nuclear radiation.

Policy levers were not only implemented on a national level, but on an international level as well. In June 1986, the European Community implemented new standards for cesium. They attempted to do the same for iodine, but could not reach an agreement. Several international programs were formed, including the World Association of Nuclear Operators. This association essentially linked 130 operators in 30 countries. Nuclear engineers would visit nuclear plants worldwide to learn and work towards better safety precautions.

The International Atomic Energy Agency (IAEA), established in 1957, created the Nuclear Safety Assistance Coordination Centre, which serves as an example of the international, multilateral cooperation resulting from the disaster (World Nuclear, 2016). They created the Convention on Early Notification of a Nuclear Accident and Convention on Assistance in the Case of a Nuclear Accident or Radiological Emergency. Nations called for a more comprehensive set of obligatory regulations for nuclear power plants from safe management of installation to safe management of radioactive waste. They created the Joint Convention on the Safety of Spent Fuel Management, which obligated nations to establish proper policies for the management of nuclear power plants.

A number of charitable organizations were also created across various countries to support those affected by the disaster. In the United Kingdom, Chernobyl Children's Project (UK), Friends of Chernobyl's Children, Aid Convoy, Chernobyl 2000, and Chernobyl Children Life Line were set up to assist people affected by the meltdown, radiation, and evacuation. Organizations were also created in Ireland, with The Greater Chernobyl Cause, the Chernobyl Children's Trust, and the Chernobyl Children International. In the United States, the Chernobyl Children International was established to help those economically affected by the disaster.

=== In popular culture ===
The Chernobyl tragedy has inspired many artists across the world to create works of art, animation, video games, theatre and cinema about the disaster. The HBO series Chernobyl and the book Voices from Chernobyl by the Ukrainian-Belarusian writer Svetlana Alexievich are two well-known works. The Ukrainian artist Roman Gumanyuk created a series of artworks called "Pripyat Lights, or Chernobyl shadows" that includes 30 oil paintings about the Chernobyl accident, exhibited in 2012–2013.

The video game S.T.A.L.K.E.R.: Shadow of Chernobyl, developed by GSC Game World and released by THQ in 2007, is a first-person shooter game set in the exclusion zone. A prequel called S.T.A.L.K.E.R.: Clear Sky was released in 2008, followed by a sequel S.T.A.L.K.E.R.: Call of Pripyat, released in 2010. A later instalment, S.T.A.L.K.E.R. 2: Heart of Chornobyl, was released in 2024. Another video game inspired by the disaster is Chernobylite, which also takes place in the exclusion zone and features environments created using 3D scans of real-world locations. The horror film Chernobyl Diaries, released in 2012, is about six tourists that hire a tour guide to take them to the abandoned city of Pripyat, where they discover they are not alone.

Filmmakers have created documentaries that examine the aftermath of the disaster over the years. Documentaries like the Oscar-winning Chernobyl Heart, released in 2003, explore how radiation affected people living in the area and information about the long-term side effects of radiation exposure. The Babushkas of Chernobyl (2015) is a documentary about three old women ("babushkas") who decided to return to the exclusion zone after the disaster. In the documentary, the women show the polluted water, their food from radioactive gardens, and explain how they manage to survive in this exclusion zone despite the radioactive levels. The documentary The Battle of Chernobyl (2006) shows rare original footage shot a day before the disaster in the city of Pripyat, then through different methods goes in depth on the chronological events that led to the explosion of reactor no.4 and the disaster response. The critically acclaimed 2019 historical drama television miniseries Chernobyl revolves around the disaster and the cleanup efforts that followed.

A photographic essay by photojournalist Paul Fusco documents problems in the children in the Chernobyl region. No evidence is offered to suggest these problems are in any way related to the nuclear incident. The work of photojournalist Michael Forster Rothbart documents the human impact of the disaster on residents who stayed in the affected area.

== See also ==
- Bibliography of Ukrainian history
- Outline of Ukrainian history
- Bibliography of science and technology in Russia and the Soviet Union
- Capture of Chernobyl – part of the 2022 Russian invasion of Ukraine
- Individual involvement in the Chernobyl disaster – People involved in the nuclear accident
- List of Chernobyl-related articles – 1986 nuclear accident in the Soviet Union
- List of books about the Chernobyl disaster – Continuing list of books about the Chernobyl meltdown
- List of industrial disasters
- Lists of nuclear disasters and radioactive incidents
- Nuclear fallout effects on an ecosystem – Effects of radiological fallout on an ecosystem
- Consequences of the Chernobyl disaster in France
