= Friends of Chernobyl's Children =

Friends of Chernobyl's Children (UK) is a charity founded in 1995 that brings children, who are at risk, from Belarus to the United Kingdom for a month every year. The charity is named after the Chernobyl disaster of 1986. It is one of the oldest of the 20 Chernobyl-named charities registered with the Charity Commission.

The founder and director of the charity, Olwyn Keogh, was appointed an MBE in 2007 "For services to child victims of the Chernobyl disaster in Belarus".

== See also ==
- List of Chernobyl-related charities
