= Nuclear fallout effects on an ecosystem =

Effects of radiological fallout on an ecosystem

This article uses Chernobyl as a case study of nuclear fallout effects on an ecosystem.

== Chernobyl ==
Officials used hydrometeorological data to create an image of what the potential nuclear fallout looked like after the Chernobyl disaster in 1986. Using this method, they were able to determine the distribution of radionuclides in the surrounding area, and discovered emissions from the nuclear reactor itself. These emissions included; fuel particles, radioactive gases, and aerosol particles. The fuel particles were due to the violent interaction between hot fuel and the cooling water in the reactor, and attached to these particles were Cerium, Zirconium, Lanthanum, and Strontium. All of these elements have low volatility, meaning they prefer to stay in a liquid or solid state rather than condensing into the atmosphere and existing as vapor.

- Cerium and Lanthanum can cause irreversible damage to marine life by deteriorating cell membranes, affecting reproductive capability, as well as crippling the nervous system.
- Strontium in its non-nuclear isotope is stable and harmless, however, when the radioactive isotope, Sr_{90}, is released into the atmosphere it can lead to anemia, cancers, and cause shortages in oxygen.
- The aerosol particles had traces of Tellurium, a toxic element which can create issues in developing fetuses, along with Caesium, which is an unstable, incredibly reactive, and toxic element.
- Also found in the aerosol particles was enriched Uranium-235.
- The most prevalent radioactive gas detected was Radon, a noble gas that has no odor, no color, and no taste, and can also travel into the atmosphere or bodies of water. Radon is also directly linked to lung cancer, and is the second leading cause of lung cancer in the populace.

All of these elements only deteriorate through radioactive decay, which is also known as a half-life. Half-lives of the nuclides previously discussed can range from mere hours, to decades. The shortest half-life for the previous elements is Zr_{95}, an isotope of zirconium which takes 1.4 hours to decay. The longest is Pu_{235}, which takes approximately 24,000 years to decay. While the initial release of these particles and elements was rather large, there were multiple low-level releases for at least a month after the initial incident at Chernobyl.

=== Local effects ===
Surrounding wildlife and fauna were drastically affected by Chernobyl's explosions. Coniferous trees, which are plentiful in the surrounding landscape, were heavily affected due to their biological sensitivity to radiation exposure. Within days of the initial explosion many pine trees in a 4 km radius died, with lessening yet still harmful effects being observed up to 120 km away. Many trees experienced interruptions in their growth, reproduction was crippled, and there were multiple observations of morphological changes. Hot particles also landed on these forests, causing holes and hollows to be burned into the trees. The surrounding soil was covered in radionuclides, which prevented substantial new growth. Deciduous trees such as Aspen, Birch, Alder, and Oak trees are more resistant to radiation exposure than coniferous trees, however they aren't immune. Damage seen on these trees was less harsh than observed on the pine trees. A lot of new deciduous growth suffered from necrosis, death of living tissue, and foliage on existing trees turned yellow and fell off. Deciduous trees resilience has allowed them to bounce back and they have populated where many coniferous trees, mostly pine, once stood. Herbaceous vegetation was also affected by radiation fallout. There were many observations of color changes in the cells, chlorophyll mutation, lack of flowering, growth depression, and vegetation death.

Mammals are a highly radio-sensitive class, and observations of mice in the surrounding area of Chernobyl showed a population decrease. Embryonic mortality increased as well, however, migration patterns of the rodents made the damaged population number increase once again. Among the small rodents affected, it was observed that there were increasing issues in the blood and livers, which is a direct correlation to radiation exposure. Issues such as liver cirrhosis, enlarged spleens, increased peroxide oxidation of tissue lipids, and a decrease in the levels of enzymes were all present in the rodents exposed to the radioactive blasts. Larger wildlife didn't fare much better. Although most livestock were relocated a safe distance away, horses and cattle located on an isolated island 6 km away from the Chernobyl radioactivity were not spared. Hyperthyroidism, stunted growth, and, of course, death plagued the animals left on the island.

The loss of human population in Chernobyl, sometimes referred to as the "exclusion zone," has allowed the ecosystems to recover. The use of herbicides, pesticides, and fertilizers has decreased because there is less agricultural activity. Biodiversity of plants and wildlife has increased, and animal populations have also increased. However, radiation continues to impact the local wildlife.

=== Global effects ===
Factors such as rainfall, wind currents, and the initial explosions at Chernobyl themselves caused the nuclear fallout to spread throughout Europe, Asia, as well as parts of North America. Not only was there a spread of these various radioactive elements previously mentioned, but there were also problems with what are known as hot particles. The Chernobyl reactor didn't just expel aerosol particles, fuel particles, and radioactive gases, but there was an additional expulsion of Uranium fuel fused together with radionuclides. These hot particles could spread for thousands of Kilometers and could produce concentrated substances in the form of raindrops known as Liquid hot particles. These particles were potentially hazardous, even in low-level radiation areas. The radioactive level in each individual hot particle could rise as high as 10 kBq, which is a fairly high dosage of radiation. These liquid hot particle droplets could be absorbed in two main ways; ingestion through food or water, and inhalation.

== Evolutionary effects ==
Mutated organisms themselves also have effects beyond the immediate area. Møller & Mousseau 2011 find that individuals carrying deleterious mutations will not be selected out immediately but will instead survive for many generations. As such they are expected to have descendants far away from contamination sites that created them, contaminating those populations, and causing fitness decline.
