= Chernobyl Children's Project (UK) =

UK-based children's charity

Chernobyl Children's Project (UK) is a UK registered charity based in Glossop, Derbyshire. The charity brings children to the UK for recuperative holidays; many of the children are in remission from cancer or have chronic conditions such as epilepsy or diabetes.

CCP (UK) was founded in 1995 by Linda Walker, who began by organising local groups to host children during the summer. It soon became apparent that holidays weren't enough, and problems within Belarus were affecting the lives of thousands of children and young adults with disabilities. Nowadays, the charity oversees many projects with the help of their Belarusian partners, Supporting Children Together. These include:

- Funding extra carers in institutions for children and adults with disabilities
- Running an independent living scheme for 5 young adults
- Running a family style home for 4 children with disabilities
- Coordinating an extensive training and educational programme to support children when they leave care, find foster families, get children back with their families and generally promote a positive attitude towards disability with the aim of deinstitutionalisation.
- Respite care for children living with families
- Supporting children with cancer by funding medicines and extra support
- Supporting the hospice in Minsk and coordinating a home hospice team in Gomel region

The charity's regional groups raise funds and organise recuperative holidays for children with health problems or who are in remission from cancer and those who live in contaminated parts of Belarus. They are great advocates for the charity and all the work being done in Belarus.
