= List of hotels in Chennai =

This article lists top hotels in Chennai, India.

== Background ==
Chennai is the third most visited city in India by foreigners, after New Delhi and Mumbai. In 2013, Chennai attracted 3,581,200 foreign tourists. The city was visited by 3,857,900 tourists in 2014 and 4,243,700 tourists in 2015. Visitors to heritage sites in Kanchipuram and Mahabalipuram and medical tourists make up the largest number of visitors to the city, chiefly from the United States, the United Kingdom, Sri Lanka, Malaysia and Singapore. In 2011, Chennai was ranked 41st in global top 100 city destination ranking, with 3,174,500 tourists, a 14 percent increase from 2010, and up from 2,059,900 tourists in 2009. In 2012, Chennai served 3,535,200 foreign tourists, ranking as the 38th most visited city in the world and the most visited city in India.

As of 2012, the city had 21 luxury hotels in the five-star category, with over 4,500 rooms in the inventory. As of 2018, the collective luxury room inventory across four and five-star categories was around 7,000. About 85 percent of the room demand in Chennai comes from business travellers. Demand in the central business district comes mainly from BFSI and PSU companies, while the demand in the southern side of the city (Old Mahabalipuram Road) comes from information technology (IT)/IT-enabled services (ITeS) companies. Proximity to electronics and the auto industry players in and around the Sriperumbudur area in the west side of the city creates demand for hotels near the Chennai airport area among business travellers.

Chennai offers the world’s most affordable five-star hotel rooms. According to a 2021 survey by LuxuryHotel.com, it is the least expensive city for a five-star stay in the world, with a baseline for a five-star room being ₹ 3,530 (34 UK pounds). It ranks 35th in the world in the percentage of five-star hotels (4.21%, with 33 five-stars among 784 hotels in the city).

== List of functioning hotels ==
Hotel	Parent company	Location	Number of rooms	Number of floors	Year of opening	Star rating	Notes	Image
Taj Connemara	Indian Hotels Company Limited	Anna Salai	150	6	1854	5-star	Oldest existing hotel in Chennai and the only heritage hotel in the city. Originally opened as the "Imperial Hotel."	
Taj Coromandel	Indian Hotels Company Limited	Nungambakkam	205	10	1974	5-star deluxe	The first luxury hotel in Chennai.	
Taj Fisherman's Cove Resort & Spa	Indian Hotels Company Limited	Covelong Beach, East Coast Road	138	2	1974	5-star deluxe	Covers an area of 48 acres (19 ha); built on the ramparts of a ruined 18th-century Dutch fortress; the first beach hotel in Chennai; has the largest swimming pool (10,000 sq.ft.) in the city.	
ITC Grand Chola Hotel	ITC Hotels	Anna Salai	600	10	2012	5-star deluxe	Largest hotel in South India and the third largest hotel in the country; dubbed the largest stand-alone hotel in the country (1,600,000 sq.ft.); built on an 8-acre plot; has the largest convention centre in the country (100,000 sq.ft.).	
Hyatt Regency Chennai	Hyatt	Anna Salai	325	18	2011	5-star deluxe	Tallest hotel in the city when built; first building in the city to surpass the LIC Building, the then tallest building in the city, in height; built on an 83-ground (199,200 sq. ft.) land.	
The Leela Palace	The Leela Palaces, Hotels and Resorts	Raja Annamalaipuram	326	16	2013	5-star deluxe	First hotel on the Marina Beach; built on a 6.25-acre property; themed after the Chettinad architecture of Tamil Nadu	
Grand Chennai by GRT Hotels	GRT Hotels	T Nagar	133	9	1999	4-star	Owned by the jewellery company, G R Thanga Maligai.	
Taj Club House	Indian Hotels Company Limited	Anna Salai	220	7	2008	5-star deluxe		
Welcomhotel Chennai	ITC Hotels	Gopalapuram	90	10	1975	5-star	The first hotel of the ITC Hotels group; formerly known as 'Chola Sheraton Hotel' and then as 'My Fortune'	
Park Hyatt Chennai	Hyatt	Velachery Road	201	11	2012	5-star deluxe		
Crowne Plaza Chennai Adyar Park	Intercontinental Hotel Group	Alwarpet	287	8	1981	5-star	Originally built as 'Adyar Gate Hotel' in 1981	
Trident	The Oberoi Group	Meenambakkam	167	3	1988	5-star	The first airport hotel in Chennai; built on 5 acres (2.0 ha) of land	
The Park	The Park Hotels	Anna Salai	214	12	2002	5-star deluxe	Built on the erstwhile 'Gemini Studios'	
Le Royal Meridien	Marriott International	St. Thomas Mount	240	3	2000	5-star deluxe	Built on a 3.44-acre property	
Westin Chennai	Marriott International	Velachery	215	10	2013	5-star	Built on a plot measuring 7,792 sq.m.	
Radisson Blu Hotel	Radisson Hotels	St. Thomas Mount	101	3	1999	5-star	The second 5-star airport hotel in the city	
Radisson Blu City Centre	Radisson Hotels	Egmore	162	12	2012	5-star		
Hilton Chennai	Hilton Worldwide	Ekkaduthangal	253	11	2011	5-star deluxe	Built on a 42-ground property	
Residency Towers	The Residency Group of Hotels	T. Nagar	176	16	2003	4-star	Built on a 26-ground property	
The Raintree Hotel Anna Salai	Ceebros Hotels	Anna Salai	230	16	2010	5-star		
Raintree Hotel, St Mary's Road	Ceebros Hotels	Alwarpet	105	14	2005	5-star	First hotel in South India to get the Eco hotel certificate	
Savera Hotel		Dr. Radhakrishnan Salai	230	11	1969	4-star	One of the oldest high-rise hotels in the city.	
Accord Metropolitan	Accord Group	T. Nagar	162	13	2005	5-star	Originally opened as the "Trader's Hotel"	
Elite Grand Hotel		Old Mahabalipuram Road, Semmencherry	178	6	2007	5-star	Built on a 2.25 acres of land; originally built as the Kohinoor Asiana Hotel	

== See also ==
- List of hotels in India
- Tourism in Chennai
