= The Raintree Hotel Anna Salai =

Luxury hotel in Chennai, India

- Interactive map of the The Raintree Hotel; Anna Salai area
- Hotel chain: Ceebros Hotels

General information
- Location: Chennai, India, 636, Anna Salai, Teynampet; Chennai, Tamil Nadu 600 035
- Coordinates: 13°02′02″N 80°14′31″E
- Opening: 27 July 2010
- Cost: ₹ 2,000 million
- Owner: Ceebros Hotels

Height
- Height: 170 feet (52 m)

Technical details
- Floor count: 16

Design and construction
- Architect: Uphasani Design Cells
- Developer: C. Subba Reddy

Other information
- Number of rooms: 230
- Number of suites: 13
- Number of restaurants: 5
- Parking: 200 cars

Website
- raintreehotels.com

The Raintree Hotel Anna Salai is a five-star hotel located on Anna Salai in Chennai, India. It is the second hotel of The Raintree hotels opened in July 2010 at a cost of ₹ 2,000 million.

== History ==
The hotel was opened in July 2010. In August 2013, the hotel joined Summit Hotels & Resorts, a brand of the Preferred Hotel Group, which included the hotel in its Asia Pacific portfolio.

== The hotel ==
The hotel has a total of 230 rooms. The rooms are divided into 154 deluxe rooms, 8 premium rooms, 51club rooms, 4 studio rooms, 12 executive suites and 1 presidential suite. The restaurants at the hotel include Kitchen, a multi-cuisine restaurant, Madras, a South Indian delicacies restaurant, Madera, a lounge bar, Up North, the roof-top Punjabi restaurant and High Bar. There are three banquet halls and three conference venues which totals to 12,000 square feet (1,100 m^{2}) of banqueting space. The hotel also has a rooftop pool along with a health club and spa.

The hotel was designed by Uphasani Design Cells architects and the interiors were done by Zeiler & Lim, Malaysia.

== Awards ==
- Times Food Award for Best Seafood Cuisine; Presented by Times of India – 2012
- NDTV Hindu Lifestyle Award for Best Eco Hotel; Presented by NDTV Hindu – 2011
- Business Gaurav SME Award 2011- Hospitality; Presented by D & B – Axis Bank – 2011

== See also ==
- Hotels in Chennai
- Raintree Hotel St Mary's Road
- List of tallest buildings in Chennai
