= The Westin Chennai Velachery =

Luxury hotel in Chennai, India

- The Westin Chennai Velachery
- Interactive map of the The Westin Chennai Velachery area
- Hotel chain: Westin Hotels & Resorts

General information
- Location: India, 154 Velachery Main Road, Velachery; Chennai, Tamil Nadu 600 042
- Coordinates: 12°59′22″N 80°13′07″E
- Opening: February 2013
- Owner: P. Mohamed Ali (Mfar Hotels and Resorts Limited)

Technical details
- Floor count: 10

Other information
- Number of rooms: 215

Website
- www.marriott.com/hotels/travel/maavw-the-westin-chennai-velachery/

The Westin Chennai Velachery is a 10-storied five-star hotel in Chennai, India. Located on Velachery Main Road in Velachery, a southern suburb of Chennai, it is the sixth Westin hotel in India.

== History ==
The hotel was opened in February 2013. In November 2013, the hotel launched its Asian speciality restaurant, EEST (standing for Elegant, Exquisite, Serenity and Triumph).

== The hotel ==
The hotel is built on a plot measuring 7792 sq m. With a room count of 215, the hotel has four food and beverage venues, including an all-day dining, a specialty restaurant, a bar and a poolside restaurant. Leisure facilities in the hotel include a gym named Westin Workout, an outdoor pool, a spa named 'Heavenly Spa', and a group running programme called 'Run Westin'. It also features over 12,600 square feet (1,170 sq m) of meeting and function space, including two pillarless ballrooms and 12 break-out rooms, in addition to a business centre. The hotel features an open swimming pool on the second-floor terrace level.

The hotel has three restaurants, namely, the all-day dining Seasonal Tastes, Pan Asia EEST and the Poolside Grill and Barbeque, in addition to the cricket-themed lounge bar Willows. There is a Westin Executive Club located on the top floor of the hotel.

The central courtyard of the hotel has a 35-feet cascading water body.

== See also ==
- Hotels in Chennai
- List of tallest buildings in Chennai
