= Park Hyatt Chennai =

Luxury hotel in Chennai, India

- Interactive map of the Park Hyatt Chennai area
- Hotel chain: Hyatt Hotels Corporation

General information
- Location: 39, Velachery Road, Guindy, Chennai, Tamil Nadu 600 032, India
- Coordinates: 13.0108°N 80.2236°E
- Opening: 1 October 2012
- Owner: Ambattur Clothing Limited (Ambattur Developers Pvt. Ltd)
- Operator: Hyatt Hotels Corporation

Technical details
- Floor count: 09

Design and construction
- Architect: George Wong Designs (New York City)

Other information
- Number of rooms: 201
- Number of suites: 20

Website
- http://chennai.park.hyatt.com/

Park Hyatt Chennai is a five-star luxury hotel located at Guindy, Chennai, India that opened in 2012. It is the 30th hotel in the Park Hyatt portfolio.

== History ==
The hotel was built by entrepreneur Vijay Mahtaney, owner of textile business Ambattur Clothing, upon diversifying into the business of building hotels, IT parks and residential projects through Ambattur Developers. Owned by Mahtaney and managed by Hyatt, the hotel was inaugurated on 1 October 2012.

== Design and Layout ==
The 11-story hotel has 201 rooms (ranging from 43 to 180 sq m), including 20 suites, spread across seven floors, and a large central courtyard with a lily pond. An 8,072 sq ft (747 sq m) banquet space is divisible into six rooms. A swimming pool overlooks the Guindy National Park. The hotel was designed by New York architects, George Wong Designs. The hotel is decorated with Indian textiles. designed by Venu Juneja from Goa. The 'weaving theme' features silk on one wall and canvas on the other. The signature restaurant, 'The Flying Elephant', is set on three levels, with six open show kitchens.

The hotel is built on the land where Concorde Motors stood until 2007. According to the city's historian, S. Muthiah, the hotel's interiors are "a vision in modern design and minimalism."

== Awards ==
In 2013, in the debut year of its opening, Park Hyatt Chennai was awarded 'The Best New Hotel of the Year' at the HICSA Hotels of the Year Awards–2013.

== See also ==
- List of hotels in Chennai
