= GRT Grand, Chennai =

Hotel in Chennai, India

Grand Chennai
- Interactive map of the Grand Chennai area
- Hotel chain: GRT Hotels and Resorts

General information
- Location: India, 120 Sir Thyagaraya Road, T. Nagar; Chennai, Tamil Nadu 600 017
- Coordinates: 13°2′24″N 80°14′42″E
- Opening: 1999

Technical details
- Floor count: 9

Other information
- Number of rooms: 133
- Number of suites: 6

Grand Chennai by GRT Hotels (previously known as GRT Grand Chennai) is a Luxury hotel located at T. Nagar, Chennai, India. It is owned by G.R. Thanga Maligai (P) Ltd, a jewellery organisation based in the city.

== The hotel ==
The hotel has 9 floors with 133 rooms, including 6 suites. Food and beverage sections in the hotel include J.Hind - a modernist Indian restaurant; Bazaar - for global street food; and Steam & Whistles - a gourmet pub. The hotel has about 8,200 sq ft of banquet space with a total seating capacity of about 650 persons, including a 2,850 sq ft Southern Crown hall with a seating capacity of 600 persons, a 1,160 sq ft Art Bistro hall with a seating capacity of 150 persons and a 850 sq ft Emeraldo hall with a seating capacity of about 100 persons.

In December 2001, the hotel was awarded the ISO 9001:2000 certification.

== See also ==
- Hotels in Chennai
