= Crowne Plaza Chennai Adyar Park =

Luxury hotel in Chennai, India

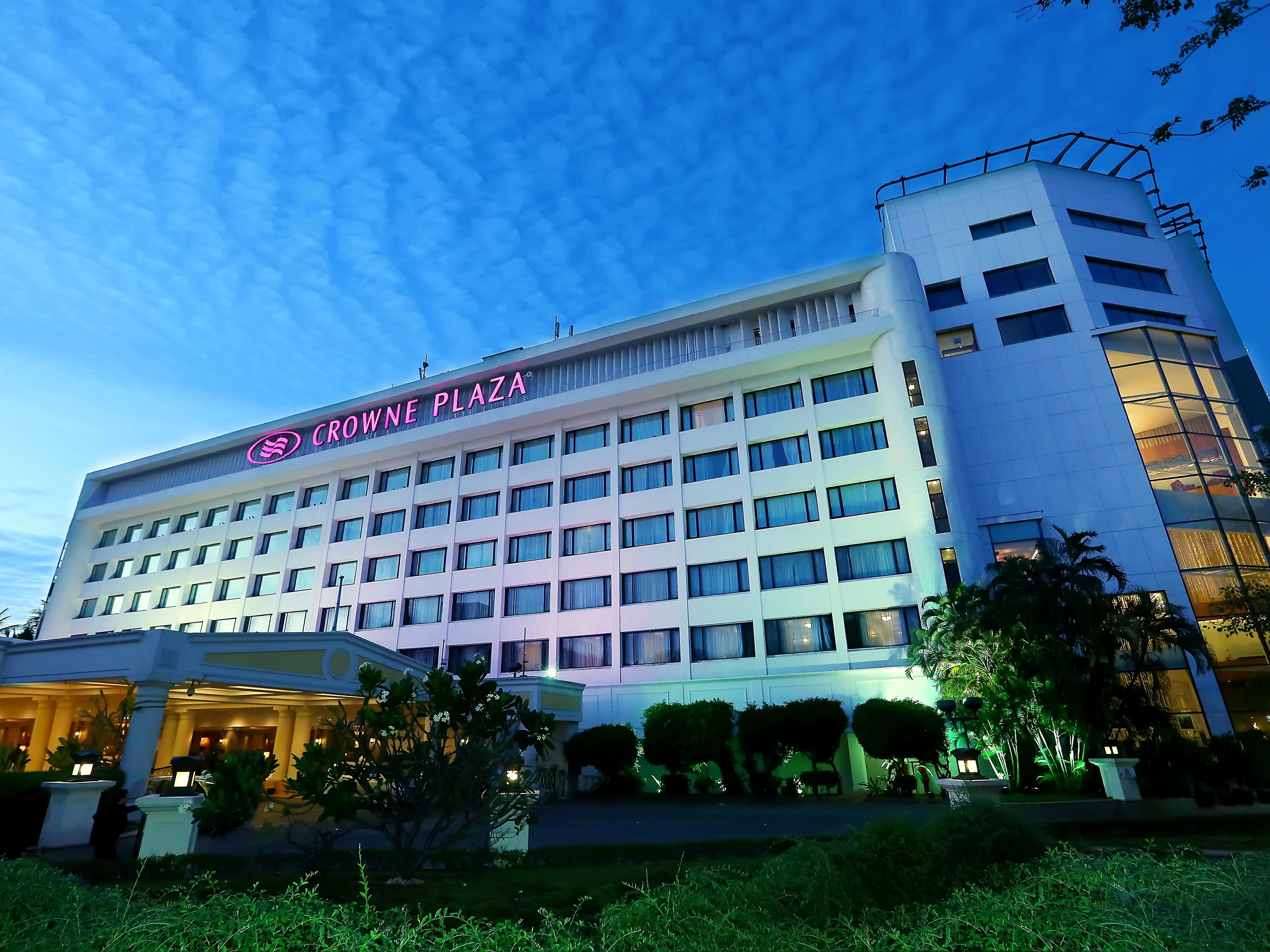
- Crowne Plaza Chennai Adyar Park
- Interactive map of the Crowne Plaza Chennai Adyar Park area

General information
- Location: Chennai, India, 132, TTK Road, Alwarpet, Chennai, Tamil Nadu 600 018, India
- Coordinates: 13.029478°N 80.249966°E
- Owner: Adyar Gate Hotels Limited

Technical details
- Floor count: 8

Other information
- Number of rooms: 283
- Number of suites: 32
- Number of restaurants: 5

The Crowne Plaza Chennai Adyar Park was a five-star hotel located on TTK Road in Chennai, India. It opened in 1981 and closed in 2023.

== History ==
The 250-room Holiday Inn Adayar Gate opened in 1981 on the site of the gates to an old "garden house". It was built by Adyar Gate Hotels Limited (AGHL), established in 1970 by T. T. Vasu (one of the owners of the T. T. Krishnamachari Group, aka TTK) and K. R. Veerappan. Later renamed the Holiday Inn Madras, the hotel was taken over by Welcomgroup Hotels in February 1985, when the controlling stake in the company was acquired by the Goyal family for ₹ 30 million. The hotel was soon after renamed the Welcomgroup Adayar Park Hotel.

In 1988, Sheraton Hotels was contracted to manage the hotel, renamed the Welcomgroup Park Sheraton Hotel & Towers. In 2015, Intercontinental Hotel Group assumed management and the hotel was renamed the Crowne Plaza Chennai Adyar Park. The hotel closed on 20 December 2023 for demolition and replacement by two luxury apartment towers.

== The hotel ==
The hotel consisted of a 6-story building, an adjacent 8-story tower block and a 2-story service block. The hotel had 283 rooms including 38 suites and 5 restaurants. Of the 283 rooms, about 140 rooms were located in the tower wing of the hotel. Restaurants and bars include "The Residency" (International cuisine restaurant in an Edwardian era setting), "Cappuccino" (the 24-hr international coffee shop located at Lobby level overlooking the poolside), the "Westminster bar" (located at Lobby level and overlooking the poolside), "On the Rocks" (international cuisine restaurant), "Dakshin" (authentic south Indian cuisine restaurant), "Gatsby2000" (themed discotheque club that can accommodate about 600 people) and "Connexions" (a Hi-tea lounge).

The hotel had 8 meeting spaces. There were 3 banquet halls with 9,000 sq ft of meeting space to accommodate up to 500 guests, mid-size halls to accommodate 20 to 30 guests and 3 board rooms with seating capacity ranging from 20 to 50 people. In addition, there were also 4 banquet halls with up to 12,000 sq ft of meeting space to accommodate up to 1,200 people and 3 board rooms with seating capacity ranging from 10 to 20 people. The hotel's underground parking could accommodate 200 to 250 cars.

== See also ==
- Hotels in Chennai
