= Ekkaduthangal =

Ekkaduthangal Echangadu
- Neighbourhood
- Ekkaduthangal ஈக்காட்டுதாங்கல் (Chennai) Ekkaduthangal (Tamil Nadu) Ekkaduthangal (India)
- Coordinates: 13.0225°N 80.2032°E
- Country: India
- State: Tamil Nadu
- District: Chennai
- Elevation: 55 m (180 ft)

Languages
  - Official: Tamil
- Time zone: UTC+5:30 (IST)
- PIN: 600032
- Telephone code: +9144xxxxxxxx
- Vehicle registration: TN-09

Ekkattuthangal, also known as Ekkaduthangal or Ekkatuthangal, is a neighbourhood in Chennai city, Tamil Nadu, India. It is surrounded by Jafferkhanpet, Guindy and Ramapuram. Area pincode is 600032, and previously it was 600097.

The neighbourhood is known for factories involved in lathes, milling, welding, etc. The neighbourhood is located close to Kathipara Junction, which is the center point of the city, connecting to Chennai Mofussil Bus Terminus, Chennai International Airport, Chennai Central railway station and Sriperumbudur. This area is also known for having two big Media houses Jaya TV and Pudiyathala Murai. Abutting the Guindy Industrial Estate, the region is experiencing rapid growth including technology parks like Olympia Tech Park, Thamarai Tech Park and Virtusa and five-star luxury hotels such as the Hilton Chennai. The Chennai Metro railway station at Ekkattuthangal became operational on 29 June 2015.
