= Trident, Chennai =

Luxury hotel in Chennai, India

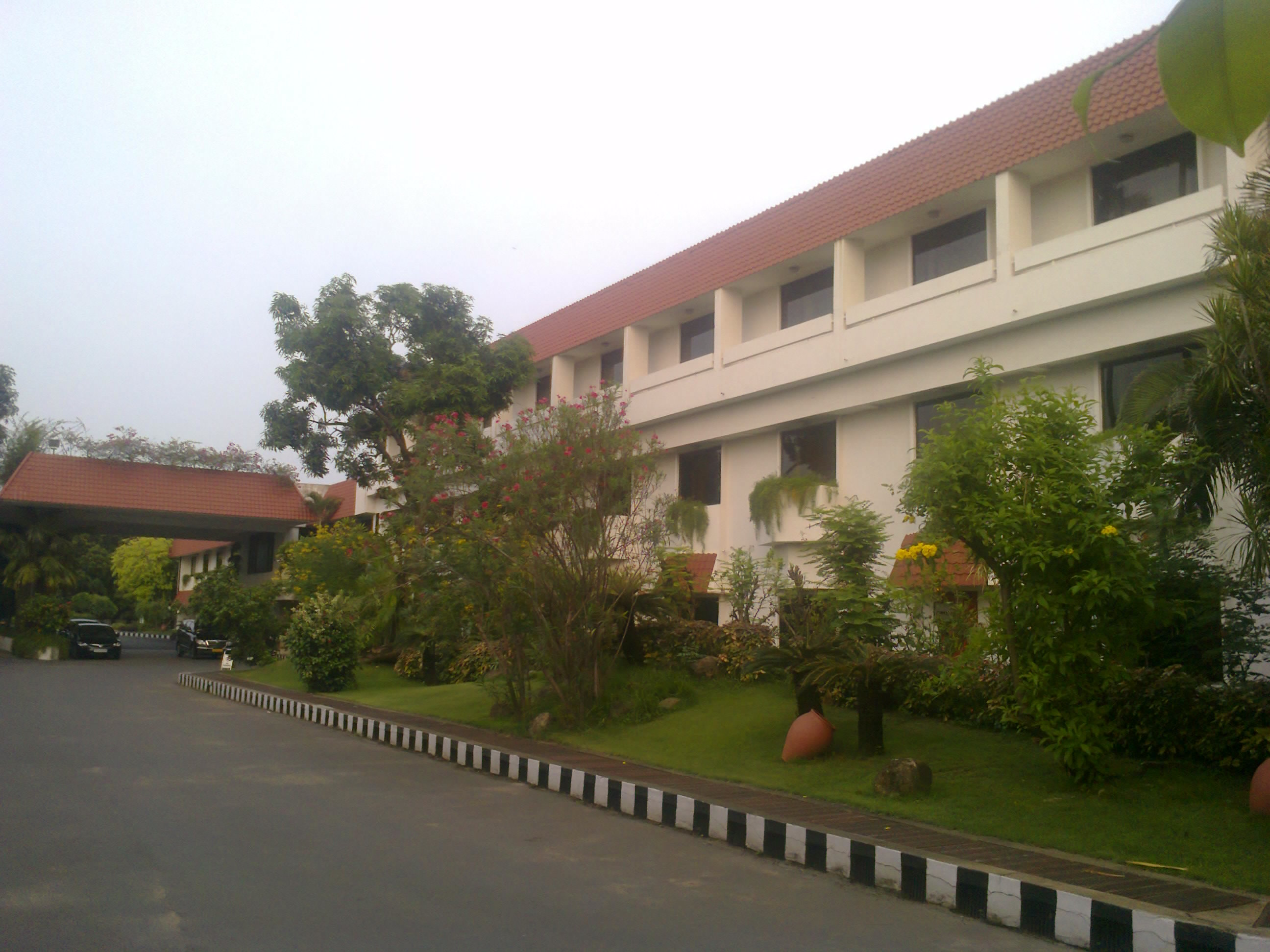
- Trident hotel in chennai
- Interactive map of the Trident, Chennai area
- Hotel chain: Oberoi Group of Hotels

General information
- Location: Chennai, India, 1/24, GST Road; Chennai, Tamil Nadu 600 027, India
- Coordinates: 12.9935°N 80.1860°E
- Opening: March 1988
- Management: Oberoi Associated Hotels Limited

Design and construction
- Architect: Coromandel Engineering
- Developer: EIH Associated Hotels Limited

Other information
- Number of rooms: 157
- Number of suites: 10
- Number of restaurants: 3

Website
- www.tridenthotels.com/hotels-in-chennai

Trident, Chennai is a five-star hotel located on GST Road at Meenambakkam, Chennai, India, directly across GST Road from the Chennai International Airport, about 20 minutes from the Chennai city centre. Managed by the Oberoi Group of Hotels, the hotel is built on 5 acres (2.0 ha) of land and is the first airport hotel of the city. It is also the registered office of the EIH Associated Hotels Limited.

== History ==
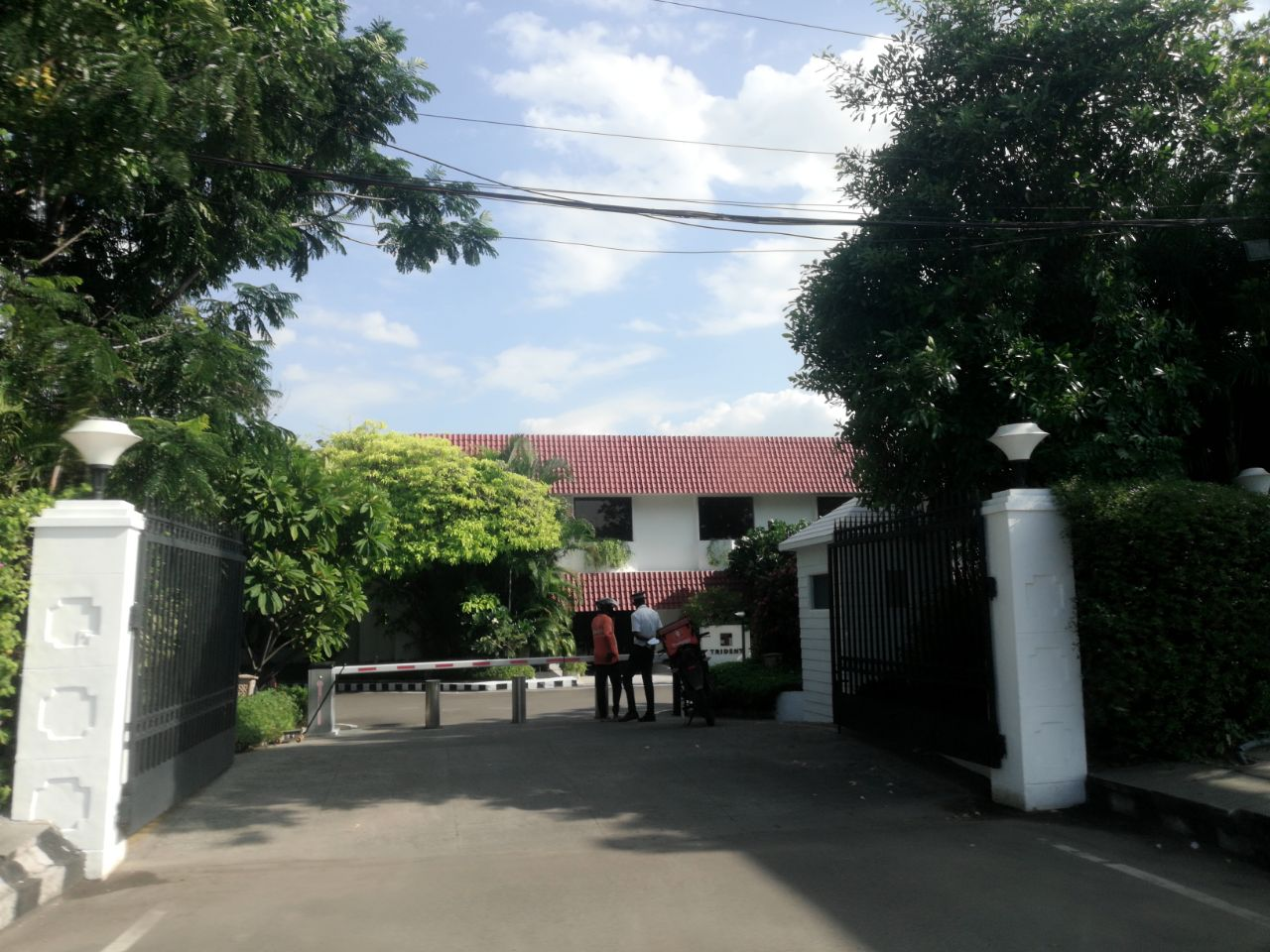
Entrance of Trident Chennai at in October 2025

The hotel was built on a mango garden, known as Maanthoppu, which was previously the garden of a commanding officer named Colonel John Noble. It was built under the EIH Associated Hotels Limited (EAHL), which was initially promoted by the Rane Group in Chennai, and was incorporated in India on 21 March 1983 as 'Pleasant Hotels Limited' under the Companies Act. Soon, the group sold the property to the Oberoi Group due to lack of expertise in hospitality management. On October 25, 1989, the name was changed to Oberoi Associated Hotels Limited consequent upon issue of a fresh certificate of incorporation. On November 1, 1996, the name of the company was further changed to its present name 'EIH Associated Hotels Limited' consequent upon issue of a fresh certificate of incorporation. In 1987, the company made a public offer of its equity shares which were listed on the Bombay Stock Exchange and the Madras Stock Exchange. EIHL took over the management in the year 1988. EAHL started operations of its Chennai hotel under the brand 'Trident' in March 1988.

In April 2004, the hotel, which was originally the "Trident Hotel", was rebranded as "Trident Hilton". On 1 April 2008, the hotel was once again rebranded as "Trident".

== The hotel ==
Built on a 5-acre land, the hotel has 167 rooms, including 157 rooms and 10 suites, restaurants named "Cinnamon" and "Samudra", and a bar named "Arcot Bar". The "Alaap I" and "Alaap II" meeting rooms combined are 4,356 square feet (404.7 m^{2}) with capacity for 375 people. The "Chettinad" meeting room is 880 square feet (82 m^{2}) with capacity for 45 people. The "Trident I" meeting room can accommodate 15 people and the "Trident II" and "Trident III" meeting rooms can accommodate 6 people each.

== See also ==
- Hotels in Chennai
