= Le Royal Meridien, Chennai =

Luxury hotel in Chennai, India

Le Royal Meridien Chennai
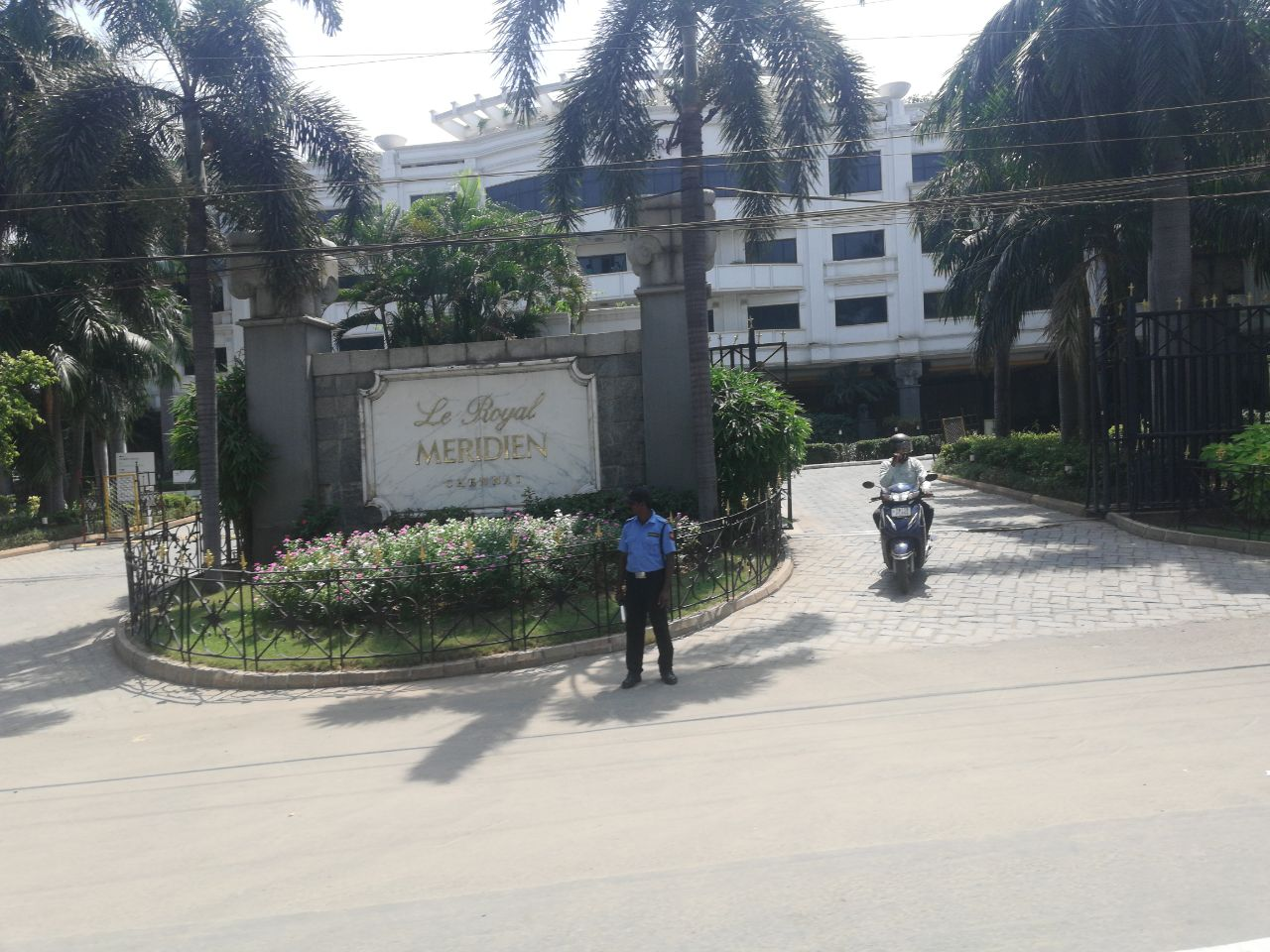
- The hotel as in February 2025
- Hotel chain: Le Méridien

General information
- Location: India, 1, GST Road, St.Thomas Mount; Chennai, Tamil Nadu
- Coordinates: 13.006758°N 80.205528°E
- Opening: 30 December 2000
- Owner: Appu Hotels Ltd.
- Operator: Marriott International

Technical details
- Floor count: 3

Other information
- Number of rooms: 240
- Number of restaurants: 3

Website
- www.marriott.com/hotels/travel/maamd-le-royal-meridien-chennai/

Le Royal Méridien Chennai is a five-star luxury hotel in Chennai, India. Initially built as Madras Hilton at an investment of ₹ 1,650 million, the hotel was, however, opened as Le Royal Meridien Chennai in 2000. It is located at the Guindy-Kathipara Junction on Anna Salai.

== History ==
The hotel was developed by the PGP Group with a management contract with Hilton Hotels & Resorts. However, the contract ended in March 2000 and the group signed a contract with Le Méridien and the hotel came under the brand "Le Royal Meridien Chennai". The hotel was soft launched on 12 April 2000, with commercial opening on 30 December 2000 when it was formally inaugurated by the then chief minister of Tamil Nadu, M. Karunanidhi.

In May 2005, Ask, the poolside barbecue at the hotel, was launched. In 2006, the hotel became part of Starwood, when the latter acquired the Le Royal Meridien brand.

== The hotel ==
The hotel is built on a 3.44 acres land with about one third of the area being a landscaped one. The hotel has 240 rooms, of which 112 are standard rooms, 57 deluxe and 41 Royal Club bedrooms, 22 deluxe suites, seven executive suites, three Royal suites and one presidential suite. The hotel's banquet halls can accommodate up to 1,500 people and the hotel has about 12 meeting spaces. It has three restaurants, namely, Navaratna (serving royal Indian cuisine), Cilantro (a 24-hour international dining restaurant serving Indian, Continental, Chinese, and South-East Asian cuisine) and Kayal (Mediterranean specialty seafood restaurant) and bars such as The Dome Bar, Flame Le Club and Le Gourmandise. The hotel has a 9,200 sq ft ballroom known as the Grand Madras Ballroom, which was claimed to be the largest pillar-less ballroom in the city when it was built.

In 2009, the hotel planned to renovate and add 15 more rooms at an investment of ₹ 750 million.

== Awards ==
The hotel was awarded the "Best Business Hotel in Asia Pacific" for the year 2002 by the Pacific Area Travel Writers Association (PATWA), at the International Travel Bourse (ITB), Berlin. It has also won the best "Innovative HR Practices 2003" by Deccan Herald Avenue.

== See also ==
- Hotels in Chennai
