= Taj Club House Chennai =

Luxury hotel in Chennai, India

Taj Club House
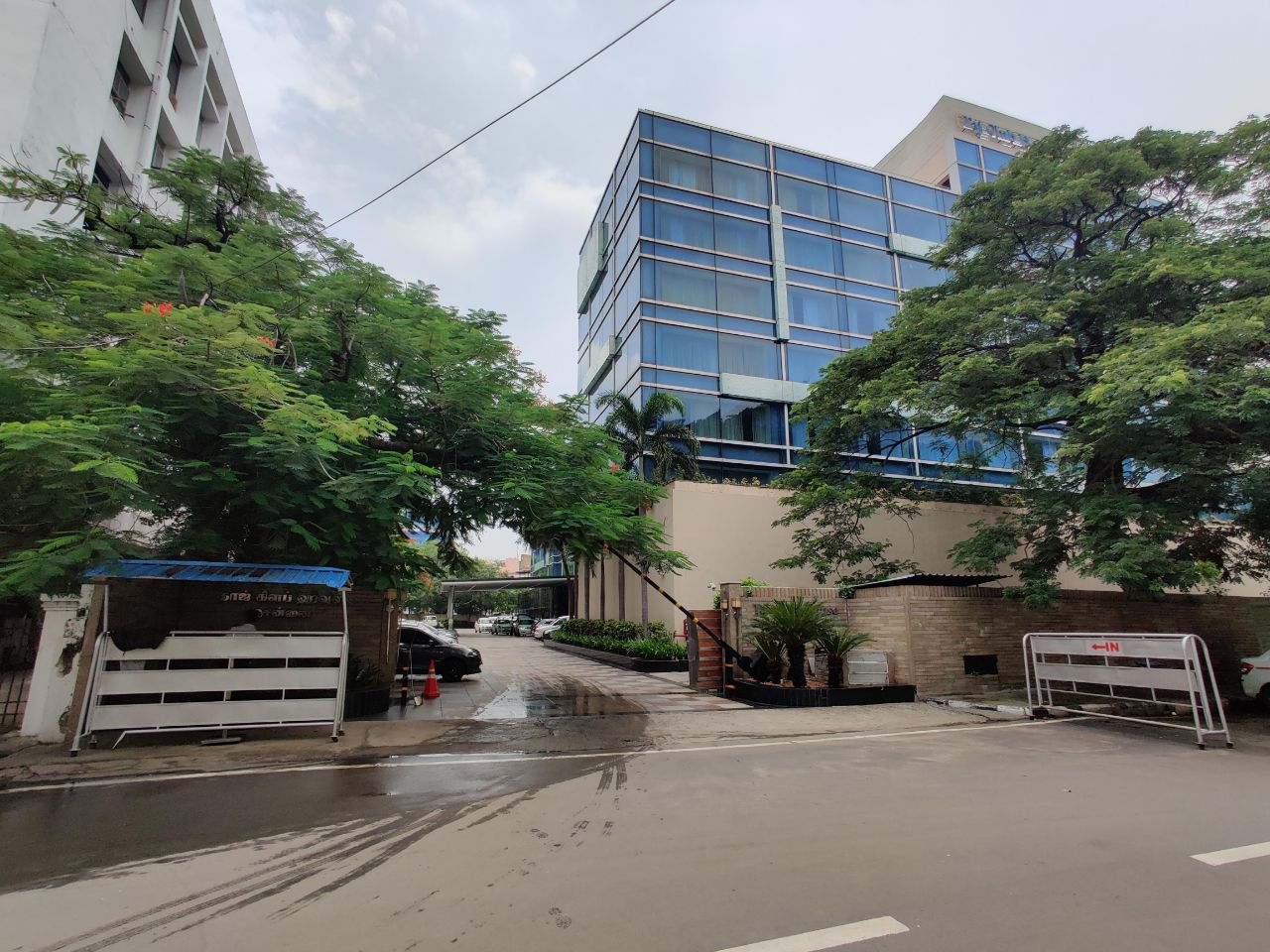
- Taj Club House Hotel, Chennai
- Interactive map of the Taj Club House area
- Hotel chain: Taj Hotels

General information
- Location: Chennai, India, 2 Club House Road, Anna Salai; Chennai, Tamil Nadu 600 002
- Coordinates: 13.061466°N 80.264013°E
- Opening: December 2008
- Owner: Taj-GVK Hotels
- Management: Taj Hotels

Technical details
- Floor count: 7

Design and construction
- Architect: Thom Catallo (Mackenzie Designphase Hospitality)

Other information
- Number of rooms: 220
- Number of suites: 16

Website
- tajhotels.com

Taj Club House is the fourth hotel of the Taj Group of Hotels in Chennai, India. Formerly known as the Taj Mount Road, it is a five-star luxury hotel located on Clubhouse Road, Anna Salai, across from the Taj Connemara Hotel, which is another property of the Taj Group. Owned by Taj-GVK Hotels, managed by Taj Hotels, and built at a cost of ₹1,600 million, it opened in December 2008. The hotel was designed by Thom Catallo of Mackenzie Designphase Hospitality.

== General information ==
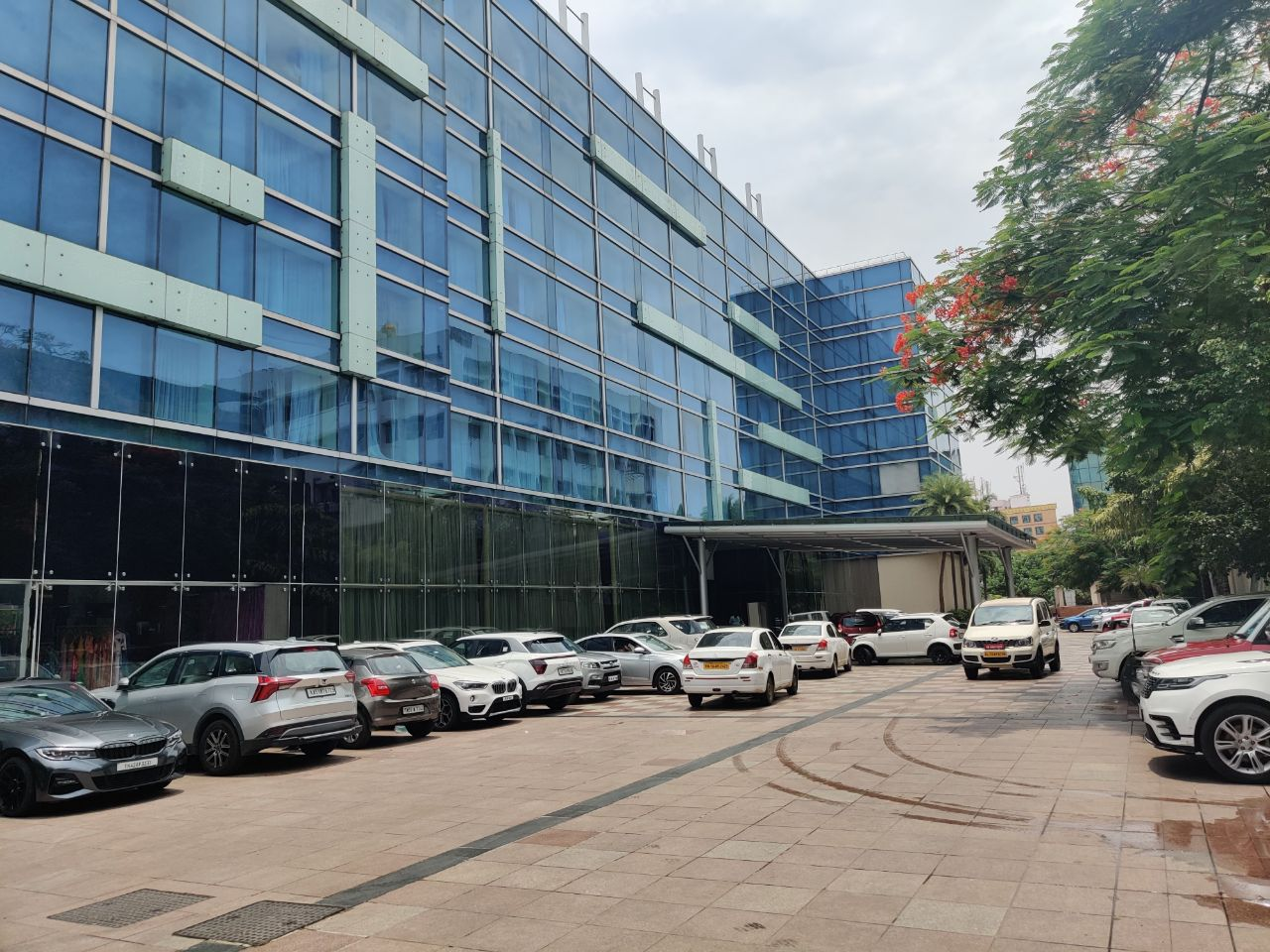
Facade of the hotel

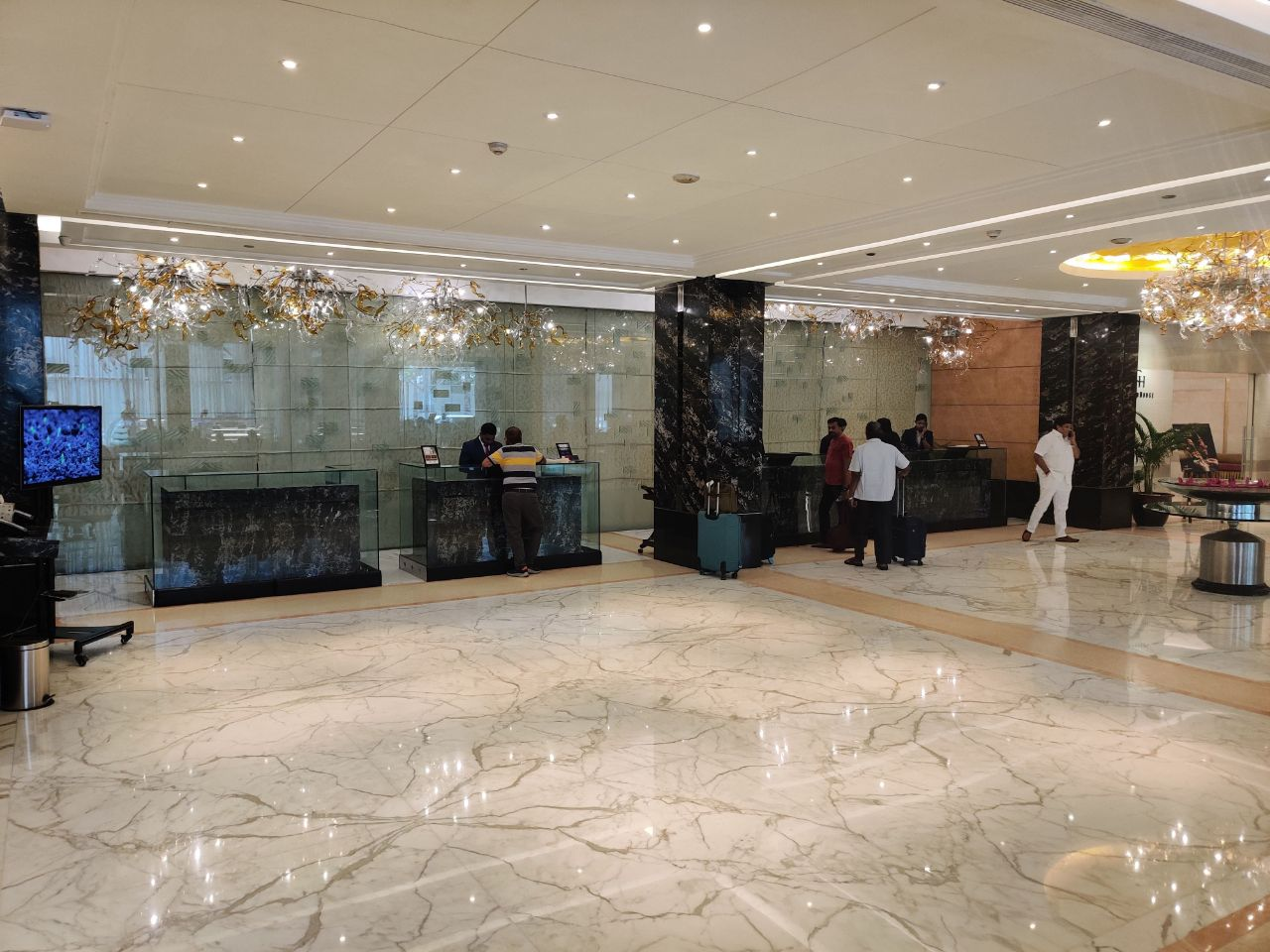
Lobby at the hotel

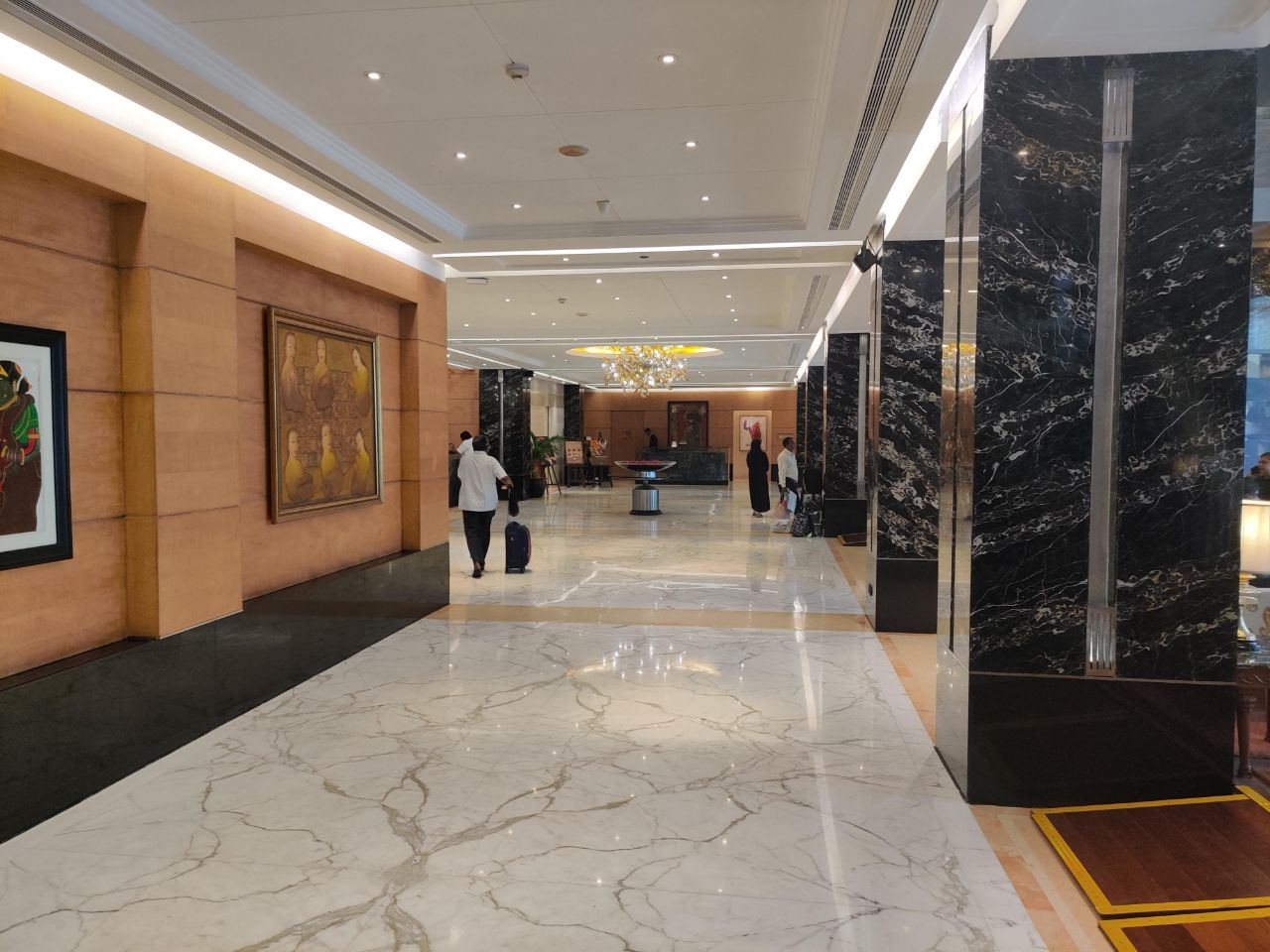
One of the corridors at the hotel

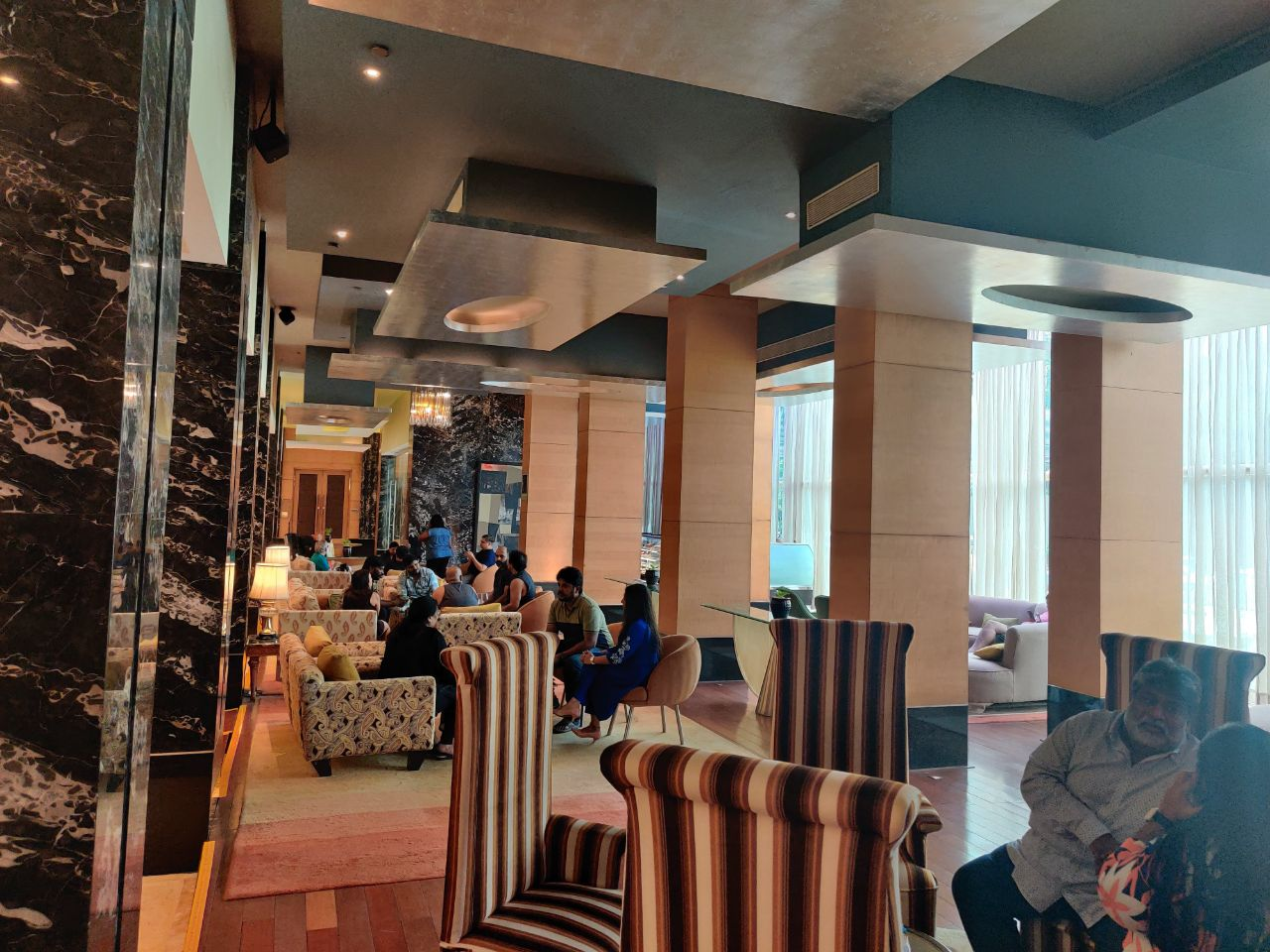
Waiting hall at the hotel

The hotel is seven stories high with a 45,000 sq ft blue glass facade and has 220 rooms including 16 suites. These include 38 superior rooms, 107 deluxe rooms, 59 premium rooms, nine executive suites (500 sq ft), six deluxe suites (662 sq ft) and a presidential suite (3,500 sq ft). The 3,300-sq ft banqueting hall on the ground floor, The Summit, can hold up to 400 guests. There are two meetings rooms with a maximum capacity of 30 and a boardroom for up to 12 people on the sixth floor.

Restaurants include Club House, the all-day dining restaurant that serves European cuisine; Beyond Indus, serving cuisine from Punjab, Rawalpindi and Sindh, including wines; Kefi, serving Mediterranean cuisine; Blend bar; Brew coffee and tea shop; and Deli, serving delicacies ranging from sandwiches to exotic chocolates. The rooftop facilities include a lap pool, a gymnasium and a yoga room.

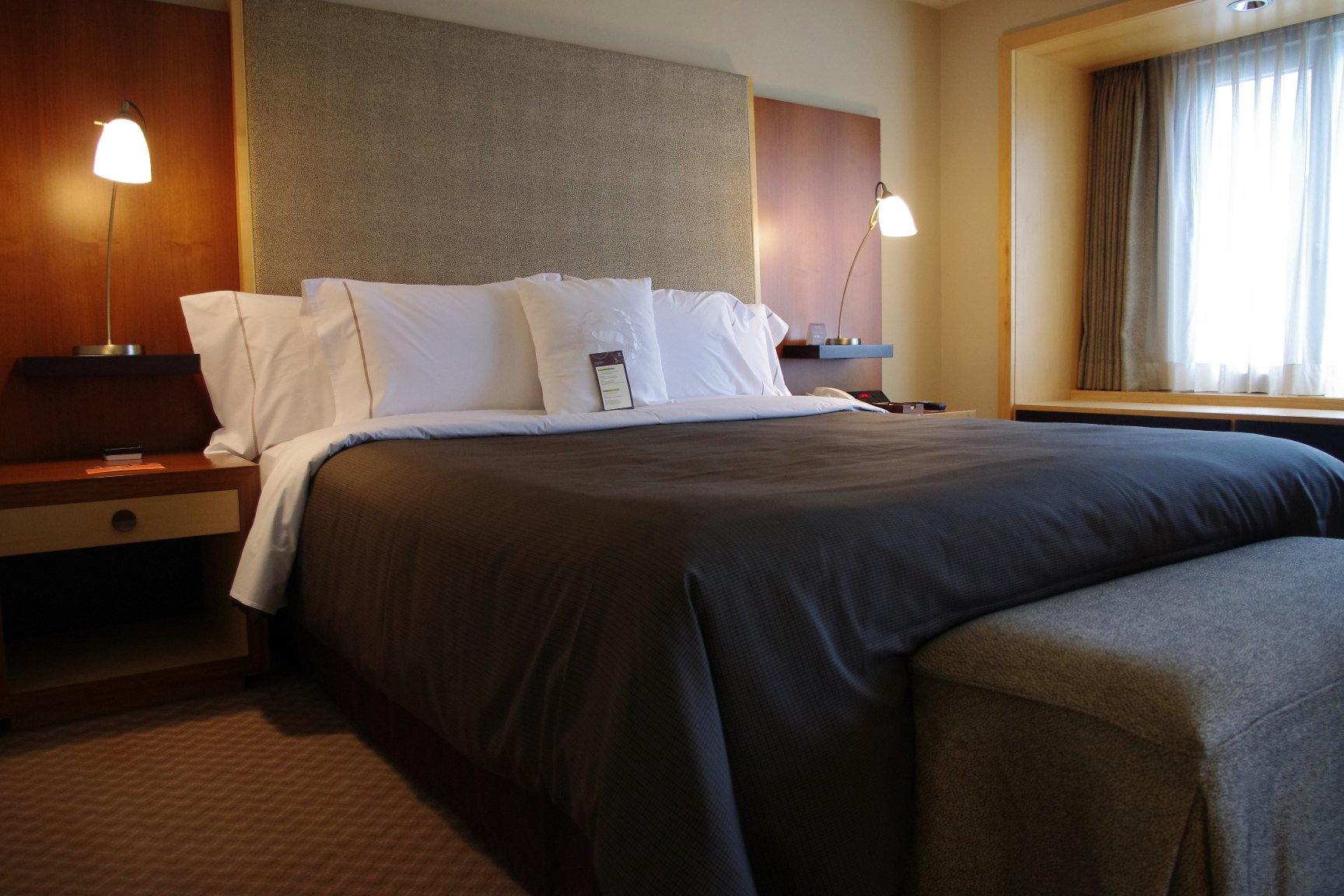
A typical room at the hotel

== Awards and recognitions ==
In 2023, the hotel was recognized with "Top Hospitality Honors" at the 8th International Hospitality Day organised by the International Hospitality Council (IHC) London and the International Institute of Hotel Management (IIHM). The Beyond Indus restaurant at the hotel bagged honours in the Restaurants Category.

== See also ==
- Hotels in Chennai
