= List of tourist attractions in Chennai =

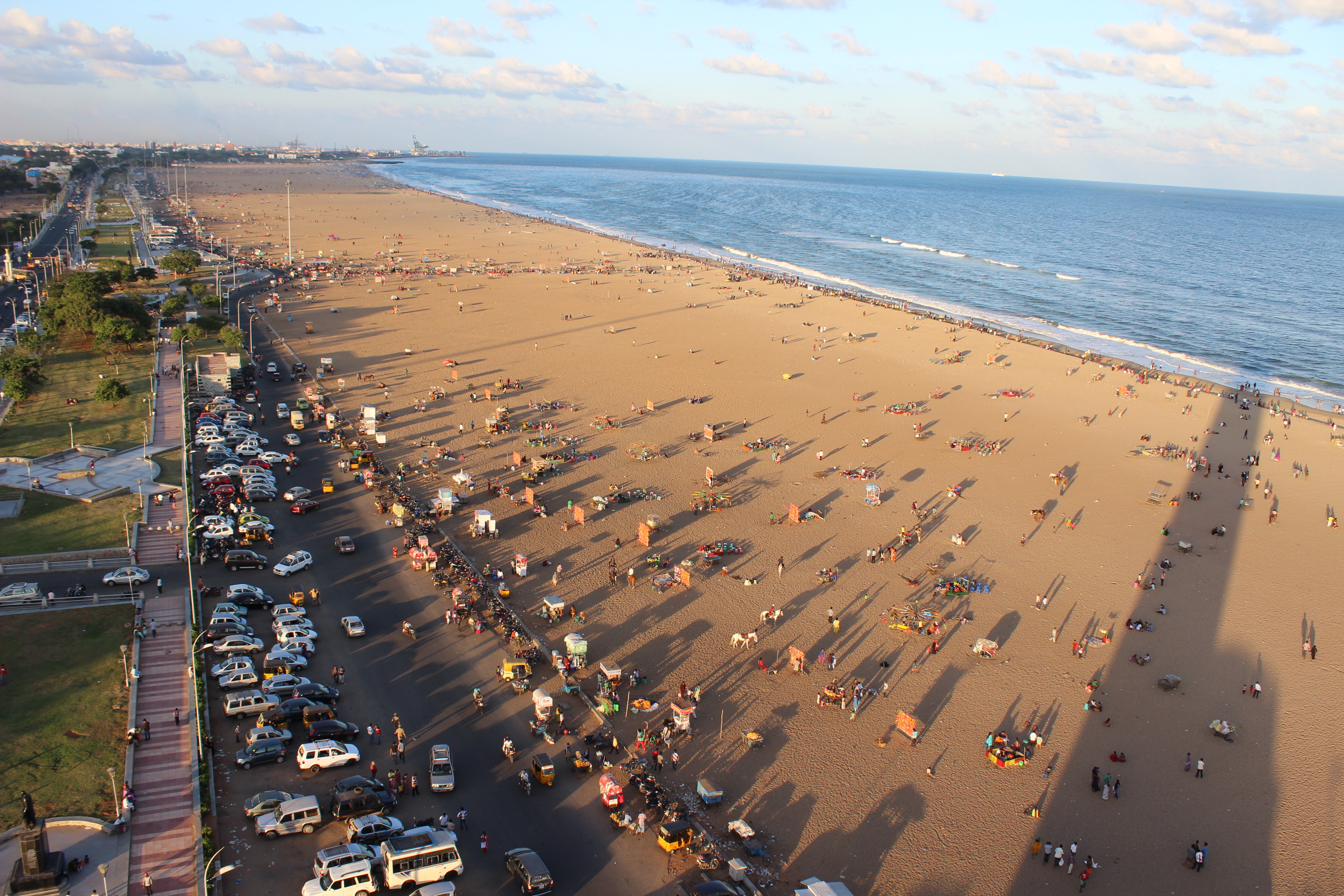
Marina Beach as seen from Light house

Chennai is the capital of the Indian state of Tamil Nadu. With its historic landmarks and buildings, long sandy beaches, cultural and art centers and parks, Chennai's tourism offers many potentially interesting locations to visitors. A notable tourist attraction in Chennai is in the neighbouring town of Mahabalipuram, with its ancient temples and rock carvings of the 7th century Pallava kingdom is an UNESCO World Heritage site.

Chennai was ranked 9th in travel guide Lonely Planet's 2015 top 10 cities ranking.

== Tourist arrival statistics ==
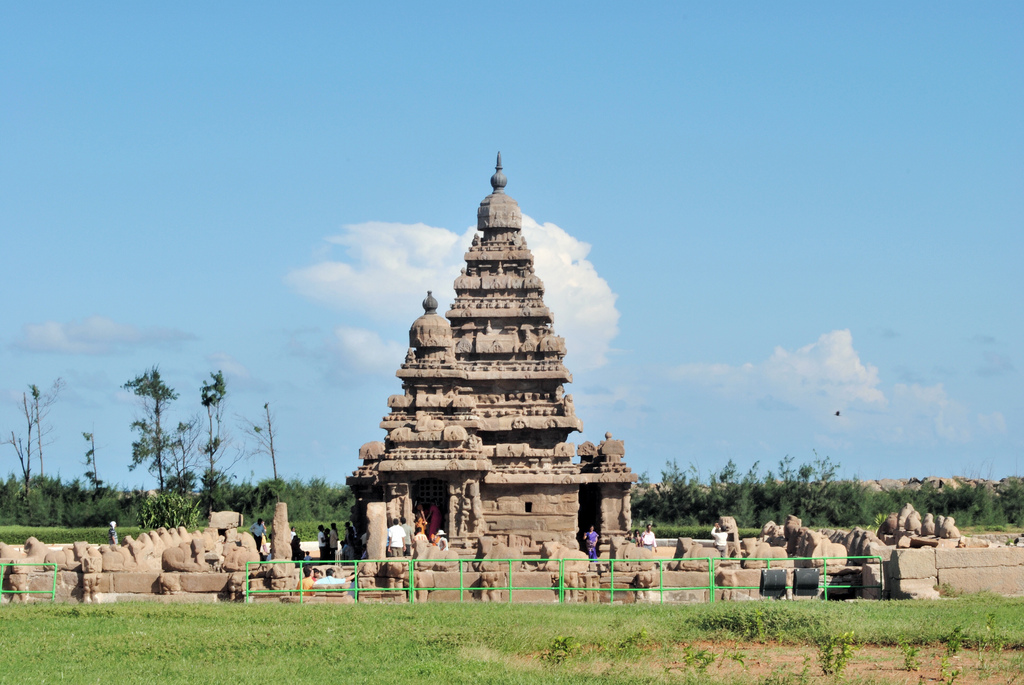
Mahabalipuram Shore Temple is a major tourist attraction

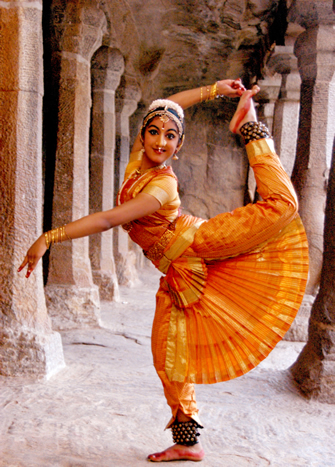
Bharatanatyam dance

Chennai had been the most visited city in India by foreign tourists consecutively from 2010 to 2012, overtaking New Delhi and Mumbai with visitors to heritage sites in Kanchipuram and Mahabalipuram and medical tourists making up the largest numbers.

In 2011, Chennai was ranked 41st in global top 100 city destination ranking, with 3,174,500 tourists, a 14 percent increase from 2010, This is up from 2,059,900 tourists in 2009, when Chennai was the third most visited city in India by foreigners ranked after Delhi and Mumbai. Tourists from United States, UK, Sri Lanka, Malaysia and Singapore had visited the city in 2007. In 2012, Chennai served 3,535,200 foreign tourists ranking as 38th most visited city in the world and most visited city in India.

In 2013, Delhi and Mumbai overtook Chennai in terms of number of foreign visitors due to their considerably higher growth rates. Chennai attracted 3,581,200 foreign tourists that year with a growth rate of only 1.1 percent over 2012. Chennai continued to remain the third most visited city destination of India by foreigners in 2014 and 2015 with 3,857,900 and 4,243,700 tourists respectively. The city was 43rd most visited city in the world for year 2015 and recorded growth of 10 percent in arrivals over 2014.

As of 2012, the city has 21 luxury hotels in the five-star category, with over 4,500 rooms in the inventory. As of 2018, the collective luxury room inventory across four and five-star categories is around 7,000. About 85 percent of the room demand in Chennai comes from business travellers. Demand in the CBD area comes mainly from BFSI and PSU companies, while the demand in the southern side of the city (Old Mahabalipuram Road) comes from IT/ITeS companies. Proximity to electronics and the auto industry players in and around the Sriperumbudur area in the west side of the city creates demand for hotels near the Chennai airport area among business travellers.

Arrival Percentage From Different Countries to Chennai
| Country | Arrival percentage |
|---|---|
| Bangladesh | 16.61 |
| US | 12.59 |
| UK | 10.57 |
| Malaysia | 3.41 |
| Sri Lanka | 5.92 |
| Japan | 2.75 |
| Australia | 2.40 |
| Canada | 2.63 |
| Germany | 2.57 |
| China | 2.77 |
| Nepal | 1.95 |
| Singapore | 1.91 |
| France | 2.54 |
| UAE | 1.68 |
| Oman | 2.19 |

== Attractions ==
=== Beaches ===
- Marina Beach is a 13-km-long urban beach along the Bay of Bengal that runs from Fort St. George in the north up to Foreshore Estate in the south. It is India's longest beach and one of the world's longest beaches and attracts around 50,000 visitors during weekends. Attractions at the Marina include the Chennai Lighthouse, MGR Memorial, Anna Memorial and Jayalalitha Memorial. The Marina's 6 km promenade includes statues of several historical figures including Mahatma Gandhi, Annie Besant, Robert Caldwell, Thiruvalluvar, Bharathiyar and Kamrajar.
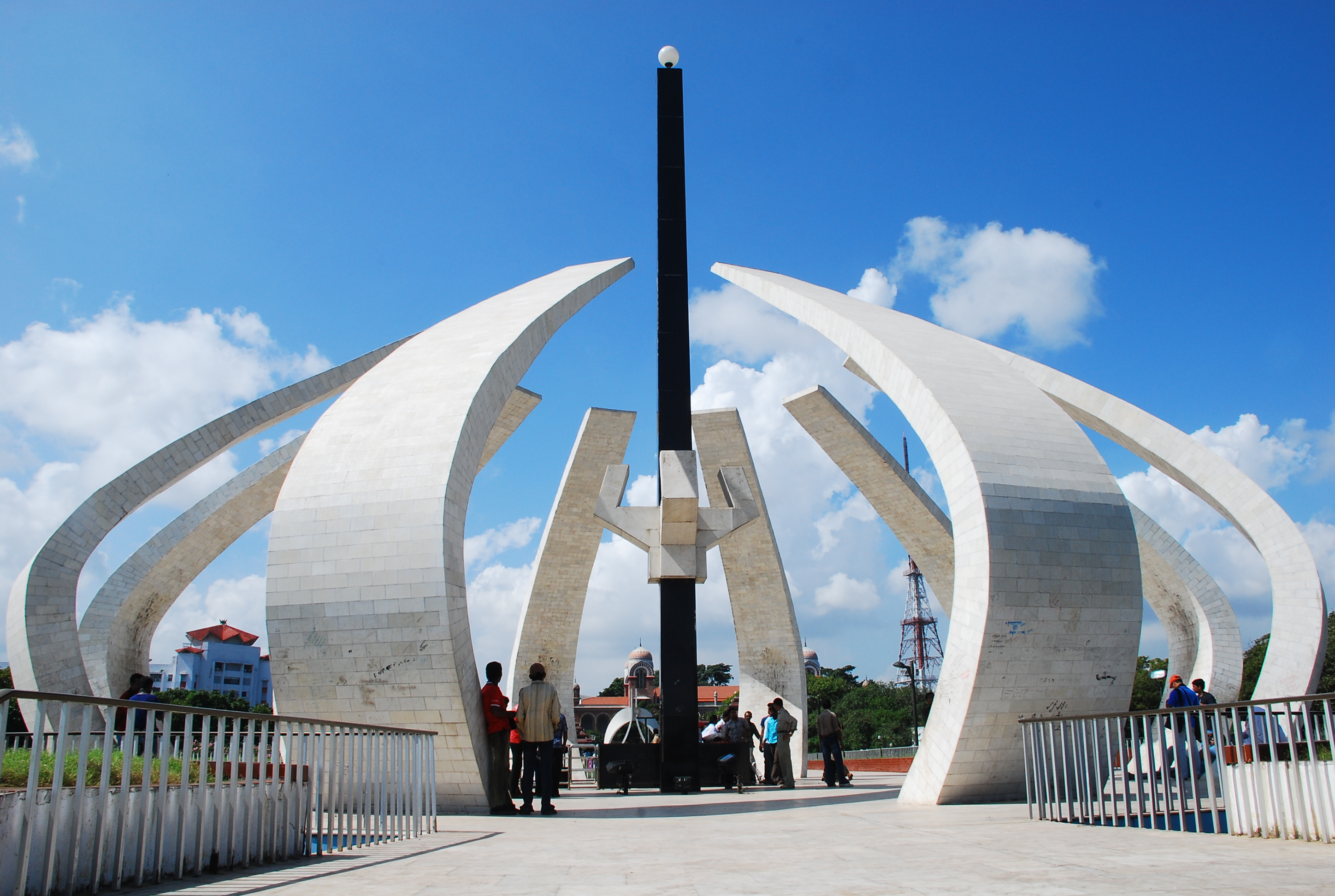
  MGR Samadhi in Marina Beach
- Elliot's Beach, also known as Besant Nagar Beach, begins where the marina ends. The beach is famous for its calm atmosphere and is preferable among morning walkers. The iconic Karl Schmidt memorial, named after the Dutch sailor who lost his life in the process of saving others from drowning is located at the heart of Elliot's Beach.

=== Museums ===
- Government Museum, Egmore Established in 1851, the museum consisting of six buildings and 46 galleries covers an area of around 16.25 acres (66,000 m^{2}) of land. The objects displayed in the museum cover a variety of artifacts and objects covering diverse fields including archeology, numismatics, zoology, natural history, sculptures, palm-leaf manuscripts and Amravati paintings. The Government Museum Complex in Egmore also houses the Connemara Public Library and the National Art Gallery. Connemara Public Library is one of the four National Depository libraries which receive a copy of all books, newspapers and periodicals published in India. The National Art Gallery building is one of the finest Indo-sarcenic type of architectures in the country.
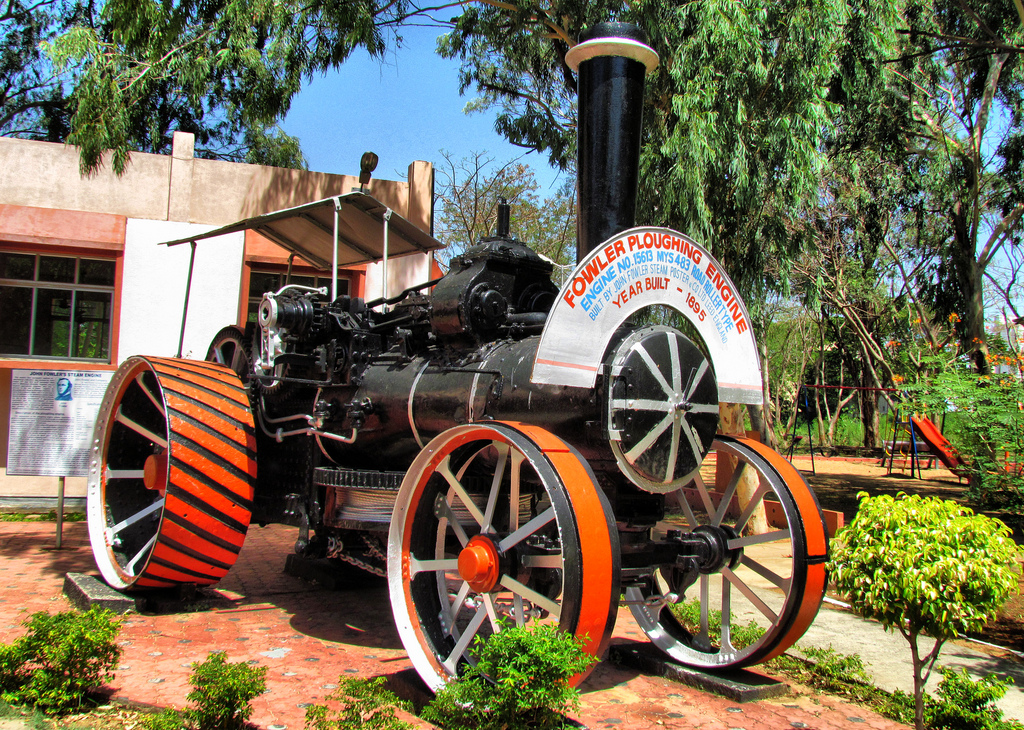
  Chennai Rail Museum
- Chennai Rail Museum a railway museum in Perambur which has a rich rail heritage of India with the host of both technical and heritage exhibits with a sizable collection of steam engines belonging to various decades of the British Raj. The museum was opened on 16 April 2002 and located on 6.25 acres on the premises Integral Coach Factory near Villivakkam. Most of the older models were manufactured by the North British Locomotive Company^{[1]} and some of the collection dates back more than one hundred years as it covers the railway history of South India.^{[2]} A toy train offers rides around the premises on regular days. Museum remains open from 10.00 am to 6.00 pm (Last entry 5.30 pm) Tuesday to Sunday and remains closed on every Monday and National Holidays. The Indoor Art Gallery is now fully renovated and opened to the public.
- Birla Planetarium, a modern planetarium that provides a virtual tour of the night sky and holding cosmic shows on a specially perforated hemispherical aluminium inner dome. It is located inside the Periyar Science and Technology Centre campus at Kotturpuram which has 8 galleries showcasing over 500 exhibits. The planetarium conducts sky shows including Solar System, eclipses, Earth, Man on Moon, comets, shooting meteoroids, stellar cycle and the deep sky every day at different times in both English and Tamil. The planetarium's 360-degree sky theatre is the first of its kind in India. The planetarium organises a special show on every second Saturday of the month to view the night sky from 7:00 pm to 9:00 pm.

=== Historical Monuments ===
- Vivekanandar Illam or Vivekananda house is remembered as the place where Swami Vivekananda stayed for nine days when he visited Chennai (then Madras) in 1897. Vivekananda House now houses a permanent exhibition on Indian Culture. Located on the busy Kamrajar Salai along the Marina Beach, it has become an important spiritual tourist attraction in the city.
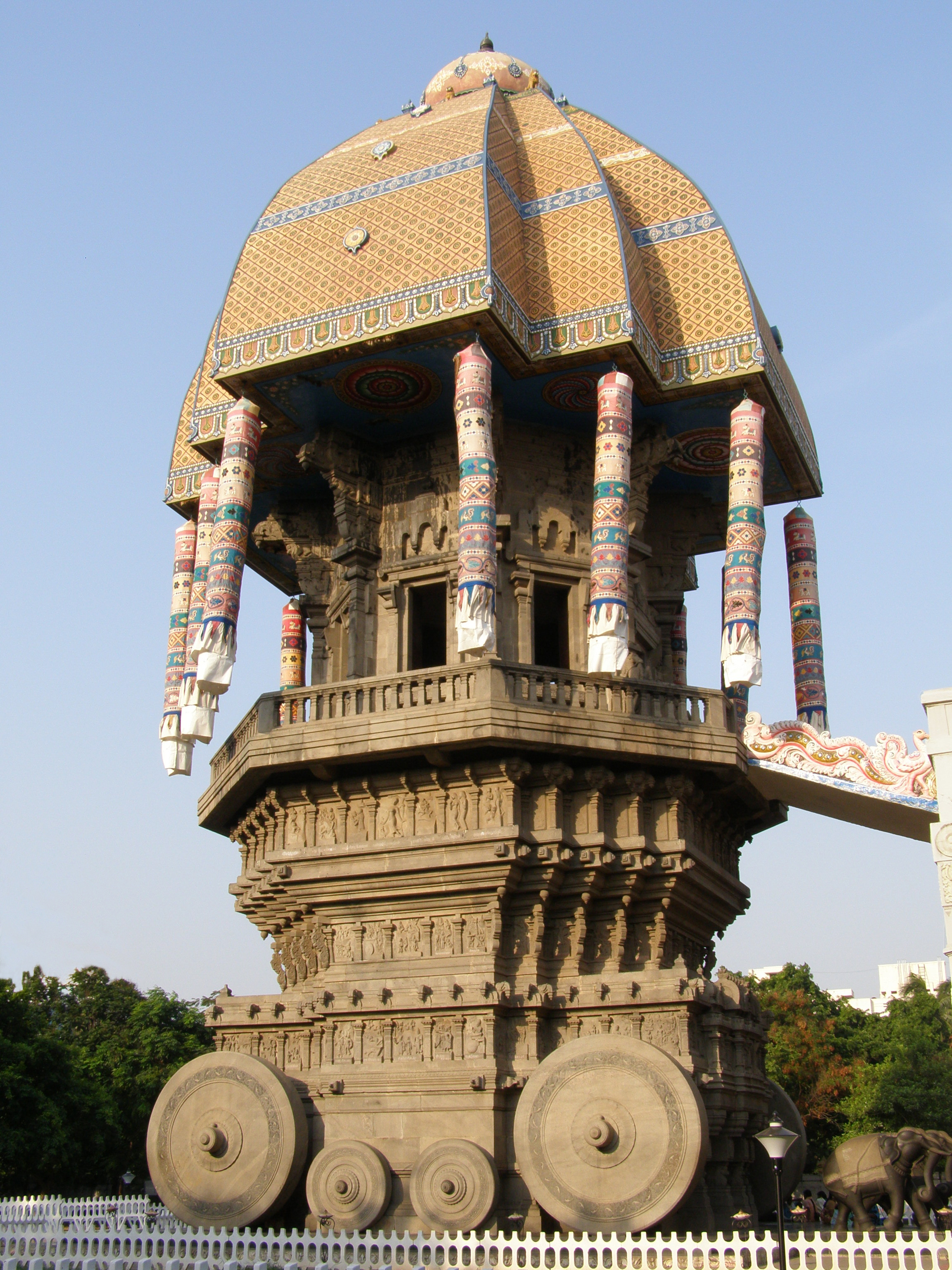
  Valluvar Kottam
- Valluvar Kottam is a popular monument in Chennai, dedicated to the classical Tamil poet, philosopher, and saint, Thiruvalluvar who wrote his famous Thirukkural some 2,000 years ago. All 133 chapters and 1330 verses of the Thirukkural are inscribed on bas-relief in the front hall's corridors. A life-size statue of Thiruvalluvar has been installed in the 39 m high chariot.
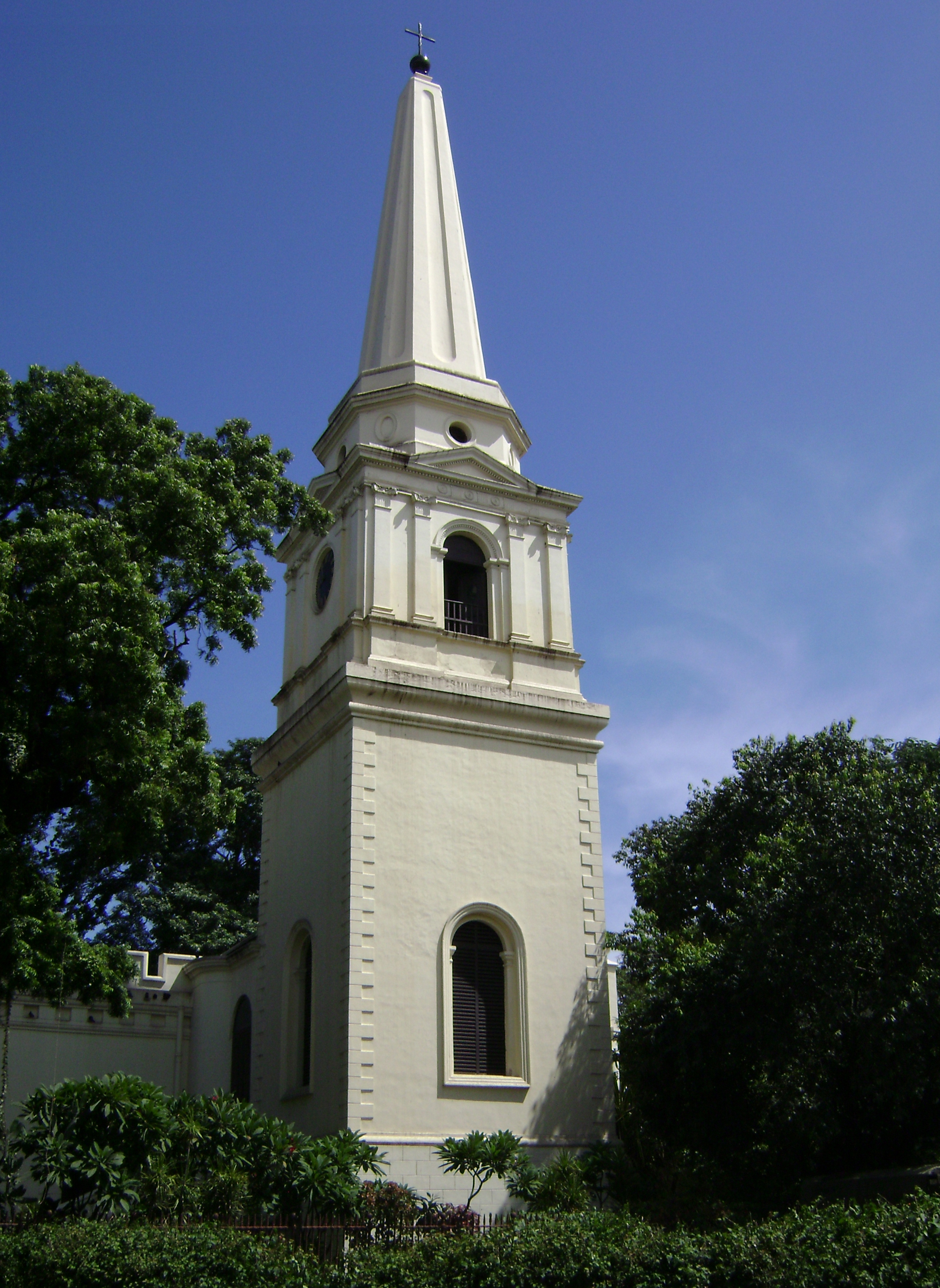
  St.Mary's Church inside Fort St.George

=== Historic Government Buildings ===
- Fort St. George is the name of the first British fortress in India, founded in 1639 at the coastal city of Madras. The fort is a stronghold with 6-meter-high (20 ft) walls that withstood a number of assaults in the 18th century. It is a feasible contention to say that the city evolved around the fortress. The fort currently houses the Tamil Nadu legislative assembly and other official buildings. The Fort Museum contains many relics of the Raj, including portraits of many of the Governors. Other monuments present inside the fort are St. Mary's Church, the oldest Anglican church in India, and Wellesley House, which holds the paintings of the Governor of the Fort and other high officials of the Regime.
- Ripon Building, commissioned in 1913 and named after Lord Ripon, Governor General of India and father of local self-government. It is the headquarters of the city's municipal body Greater Chennai Corporation, the world's 2nd oldest municipal corporation after the City of London Corporation. The building is a fine example of the Neoclassical style of architecture, a combination of, Ionic and Corinthian. The Ripon Building is an all-white structure and is located near the iconic Chennai Central railway station.
- Victoria Public Hall, or the Town Hall, is a historical building located in between the Ripon Building and the Chennai Central Railway Station and is seen as one of the finest examples of British architecture in Chennai. Built in 1888 as a town hall for the city of Madras and named after Queen Victoria to commemorate the golden jubilee.

=== Wildlife ===
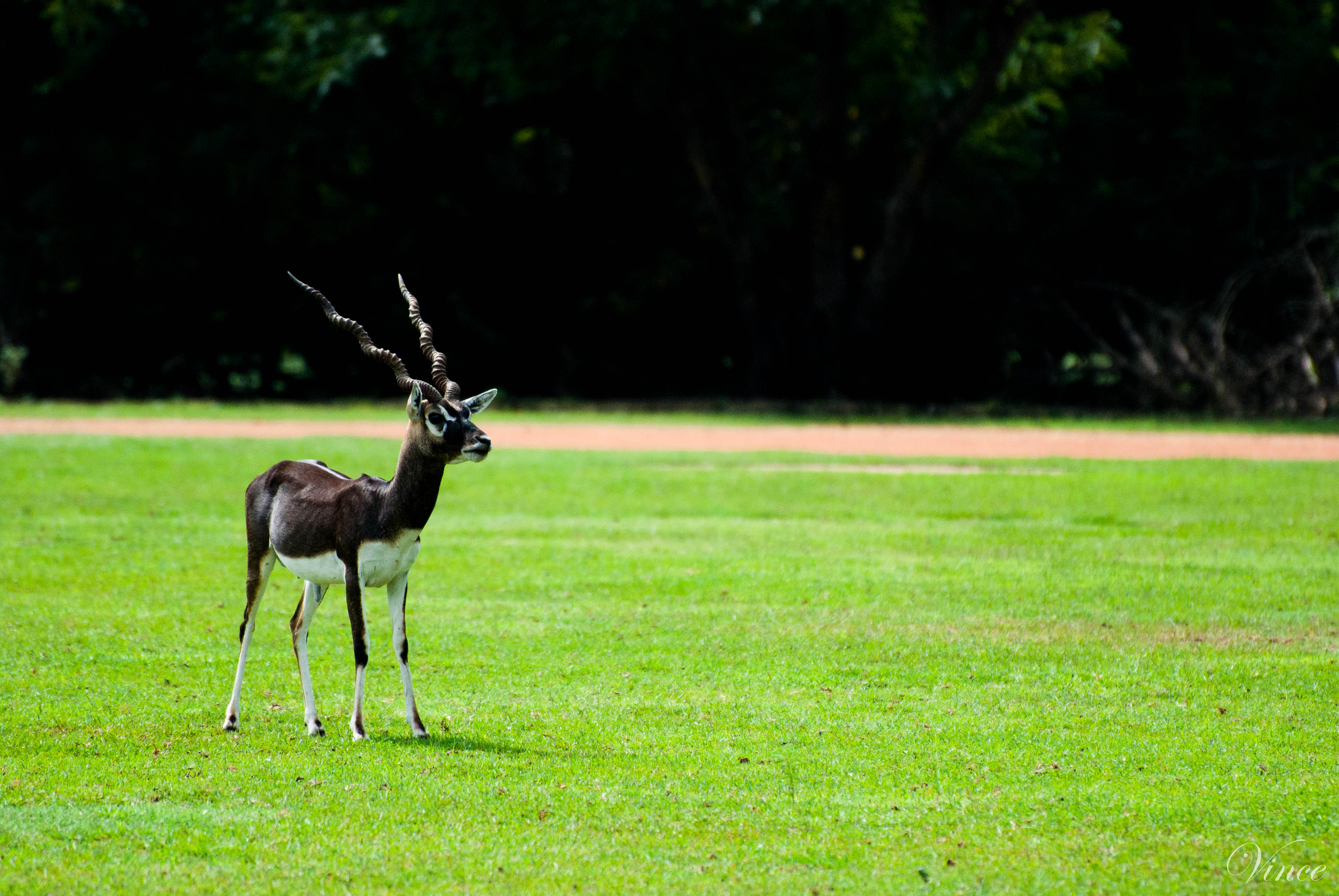
Black Buck at Guindy National Park

- Arignar Anna Zoological Park (better known as Vandalur Zoo) is located south-west of the city. Covering an area of 1490 acres, it is India's largest zoo. It has about 2200 animals belonging to 170 different species including of mammals, birds, reptiles, amphibians and fish. The zoo also has a lion safari, an elephant safari, a nocturnal animal house, walk-through aviary, butterfly house, reptile house and a crocodile enclosure. The park has tree-lined paved paths for long treks inside the campus, enabling the visitors to walk 15 to 20 kilometres (9.3 to 12.4 mi) during a visit. Battery-operated vehicles with a range of up to 80 kilometres (50 miles) are available for rent.
- Madras Crocodile Bank Trust, located south of the city, along the East Coast Road, is an important centre for herpetological research. It houses several fresh-water and salt-water crocodiles, alligators, gharials, turtles and snakes. Founded by Romulus Whitaker in 1976, the CrocBank now has a total of 2,483 animals, including 14 species of crocodiles, 10 species of turtles, 3 species of snakes, and 1 species of lizard. The bank is home to 14 species of the 23 crocodilian species living across the world, two of which are listed by the IUCN as critically endangered and three more as threatened.
- Guindy National Park, carved as a garden space from the Guindy Forest in 1670 and later established as a park in 1976, it is one of the country's smallest National Park with an area of 2.76 km^{2} and is located completely inside the city. It hosts a variety of endangered deer, foxes, monkeys and snakes. The Guindy Snake Park situated in the National Park has a large collection of snakes and is an important source of antivenom serum. For ex-situ conservation, about 22 acres (8.9 hectares) of the Guindy National Park has been carved out into a park which is known as the Children's Park and play area at the northeast corner of the national park with a collection of animals and birds.
- Pallikaranai Marshland Park

=== Nature ===
- Adyar Eco Park, locally known as Tholkappia Poonga is an ecological park set up in the Adyar estuary area to restore the vegetation of the freshwater eco-systems of the Coromandel Coast, especially the fragile ecosystem of the Adyar estuary and creek. A total of 143 species of fish, amphibians, birds and reptiles have been seen in the park and the number is expected to go up to 200. More than 85 different kinds of birds, including rare black bittern, cinnamon bittern, black-winged kite, white-bellied sea eagle, pied kingfisher, yellow wagtails and black-winged stilt have been spotted by ornithologists in the green expanse.
- Chetpet Lake, also known as Chetpet Eco Park, is a lake spread over 15 acres and is the only lake in the centre of the city. The lake became a tourist attraction from 2014 after it underwent a remarkable transformation from being a heavily encroached filthy lake to having clean water with facilities for boating, angling, water sports and beautifully surrounded by a park.
- The Huddleston Gardens of Theosophical Society is the garden that lies on the south bank of the Adyar River where the river meets the Bay of Bengal and covers 260 acres. The garden is located inside the Adyar Theosophical society which is the headquarters of the Theosophical Society which was an organization formed in 1875 to advance Theosophy. The garden also has a 450-year-old banyan tree, which was known locally as Adyar aala maram, whose aerial roots covered some 60,000 sq m. and is situated in the middle of the Theosophical Society Campus. One of the largest banyan trees in the world, it continues to miraculously survive and even thrive despite severe storm damage to its main trunk in 1989.

=== Art and Crafts ===
- DakshinaChitra is a living history museum run by the Chennai Craft Foundation, is a depiction of the way of life prevalent in 5 south Indian states collectively called as South India with exhibitions and workshops of the arts and crafts and performing artists of South India. There are around 4,220 artefacts on display; 3,200 are art-related, and 70 pertain to contemporary subjects.
- Kalakshetra, a centre for the revival of Indian art and crafts — especially the dance form of Bharatanatyam is located in Besant Nagar. Founded in January 1936 by Rukmini Devi Arundale, the institution achieved national and international recognition for its unique style and perfectionism.
- Cholamandalam Artists' Village, on the East Coast Road, offers a view of artists and sculptors at work in their own studios and permanent gallery.

=== Places of Worship ===
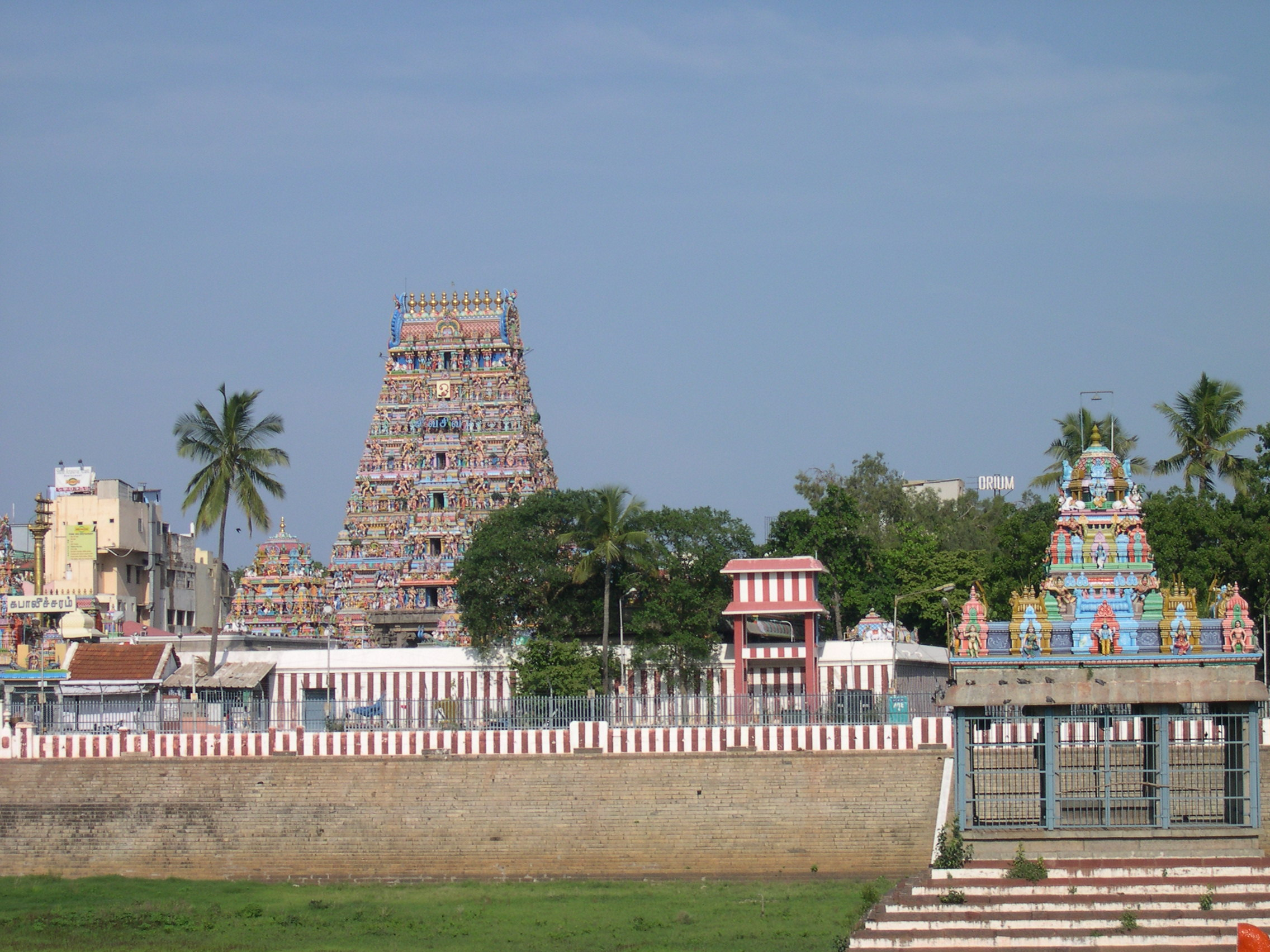
Kapaleeshwarar temple in Mylapore

- Kapaleeshwarar temple in Mylapore estimated to have been built in the 7th century by the Pallavas and has inscriptions dating back to the 12th century is one of the most visited worship places by tourists visiting the city.
- Parthasarathy Temple in Triplicane, an 8th-century Hindu Vaishnavite temple dedicated to the god Krishna. The temple is one of the oldest structures in Chennai.
- St. Thomas Mount, the site where St. Thomas, one of the disciples of Jesus Christ, was believed to have been martyred. A shrine dedicated to "Our Lady of Expectation" (Mother Mary) was built in 1523 on top of the mount.
- Santhome Basilica is a Roman Catholic minor basilica in Santhome. It was built in the 16th century by Portuguese explorers, over the tomb of Saint Thomas. This church is one of the only three known churches in the world built over the tomb of an Apostle of Jesus, the other two are located in Vatican City and Spain.
- Armenian Church of Virgin Mary, is located on the Armenian Street in Parrys. Constructed in 1712, it is one of the oldest churches of the Indian subcontinent and is famous for its belfry of six.
- St. Mary's Church located at Fort St George, is the oldest Anglican church East of Suez and also the oldest British building in India. The church is popularly known as the 'Westminster Abbey of the East'.
- Thousand Lights Mosque, a multi-domed mosque opened in 1810 and spread over an area of 3 acres, it is one of the largest mosques in India and is situated on Anna Salai Road. It is said that 1000 lights needed to be lit in order to illuminate the assembly hall and hence it was named Thousand Lights Mosque. It is also believed that the lights were lit by the Indian National Congress to mark their first visit to Madras.
- Triplicane Big Mosque, constructed in the Mughal architectural style, the mosque was built in 1795 by the family of Muhammad Ali Khan Wallajah, the Nawab of Arcot. It is considered as the largest mosque in the city of Chennai.

=== Shopping ===
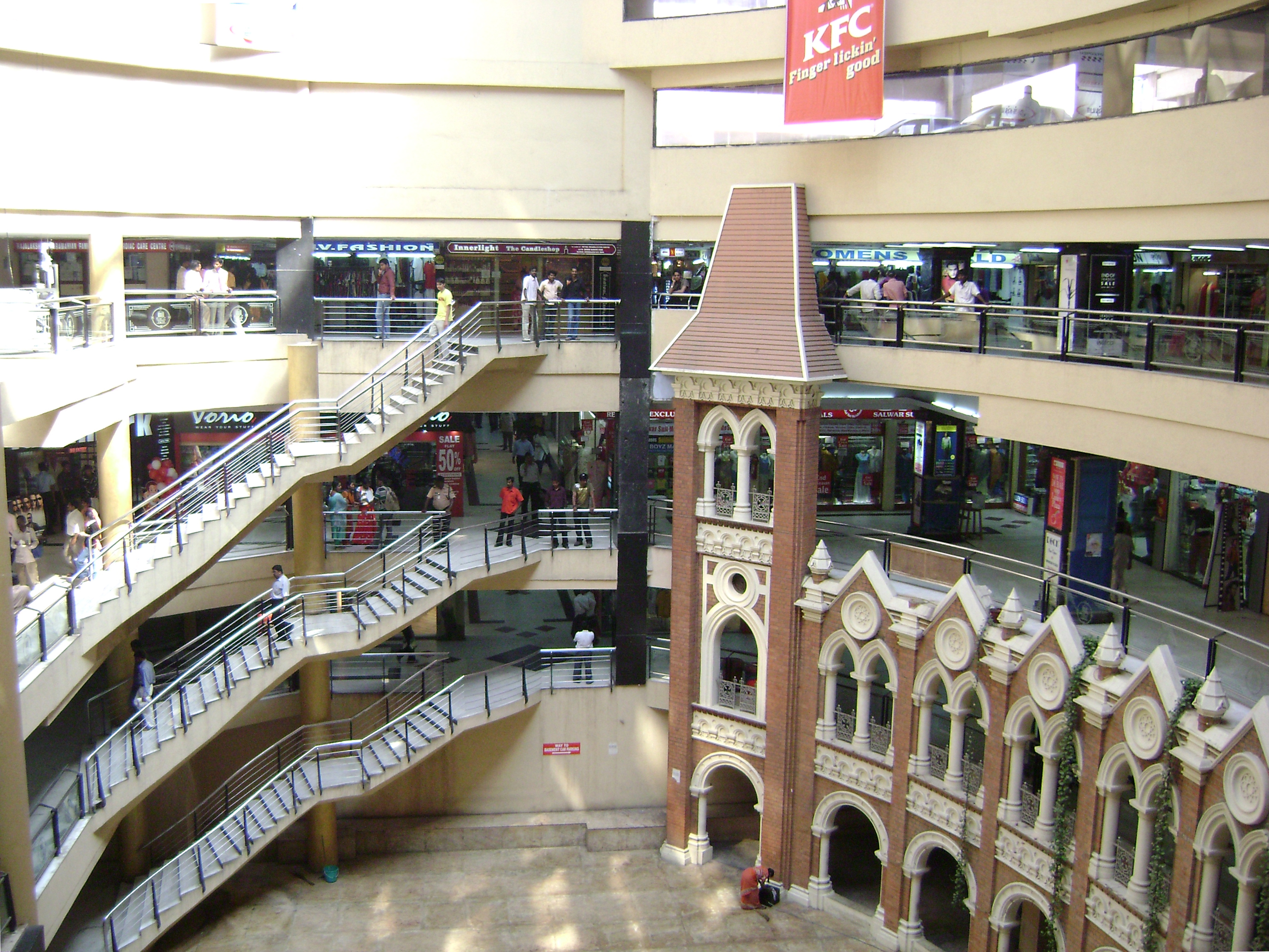
Spencer Plaza is one of the oldest and largest shopping malls in Chennai.

Chennai has some unique places to offer for shopping. Art and crafts, contemporary and traditional artwork, antiques, jewellery are available in the city. Traditional items like the leaf and palmyra-fiber handicrafts from Tirunelveli, bronze and brass castings and traditional jewellery from Kumbakonam, metal works from Thanjavur, stone carvings from Mahabalipuram, silks from Kanchipuram are for sale in shops and boutiques.

- T. Nagar, the neighbourhood is the shopping hub of the city. Two main areas are Pondy Bazaar and Ranganathan Street which are home to several multi-storey stores, unique to Chennai, which deals mainly in textiles and silks or gold, silver and diamond jewellery.
- George Town and Parrys Corner are wholesale markets of the city where one can purchase almost anything.
- Mint Street plays host to communities from Rajasthan and Gujarat and is where north Indian snacks can be sampled along with textiles, kitchenware, and jewellery.
- Burma Bazaar is famous for its counterfeit electronic goods and media.
- Moore Market in Central is known for its large number of bookstores.
- The city also has a number of shopping malls spread across the landscape including the oldest Spencer Plaza and several other modern malls that include Express Avenue, Phoenix Market City, Forum Vijaya Mall, Ampa Skywalk, Abirami Mega Mall, Mayajaal, Spectrum Mall.

=== Entertainment ===
There are four large amusement parks, MGM Dizzee World, VGP Universal Kingdom, Queen's Land near Poonnamalle and Kishkinta Located near Mudichur in Chennai. The city also houses a paintball centre and water sports club on the east coast road. There are also a large number of beach resorts all along the East Coast Road highway to Mahabalipuram. The city is home to the Tamil movie industry, has over 100+ large cinema theatres including a few multiplexes which screen Tamil, English, Hindi, Telugu, Kannada and Malayalam films. The city has a large number of restaurants offering a variety of Tamil, Indian and international cuisines. The nightlife in Chennai is vibrant and growing ranging from bars to pool parlours to lounges and clubs.

== Gallery ==
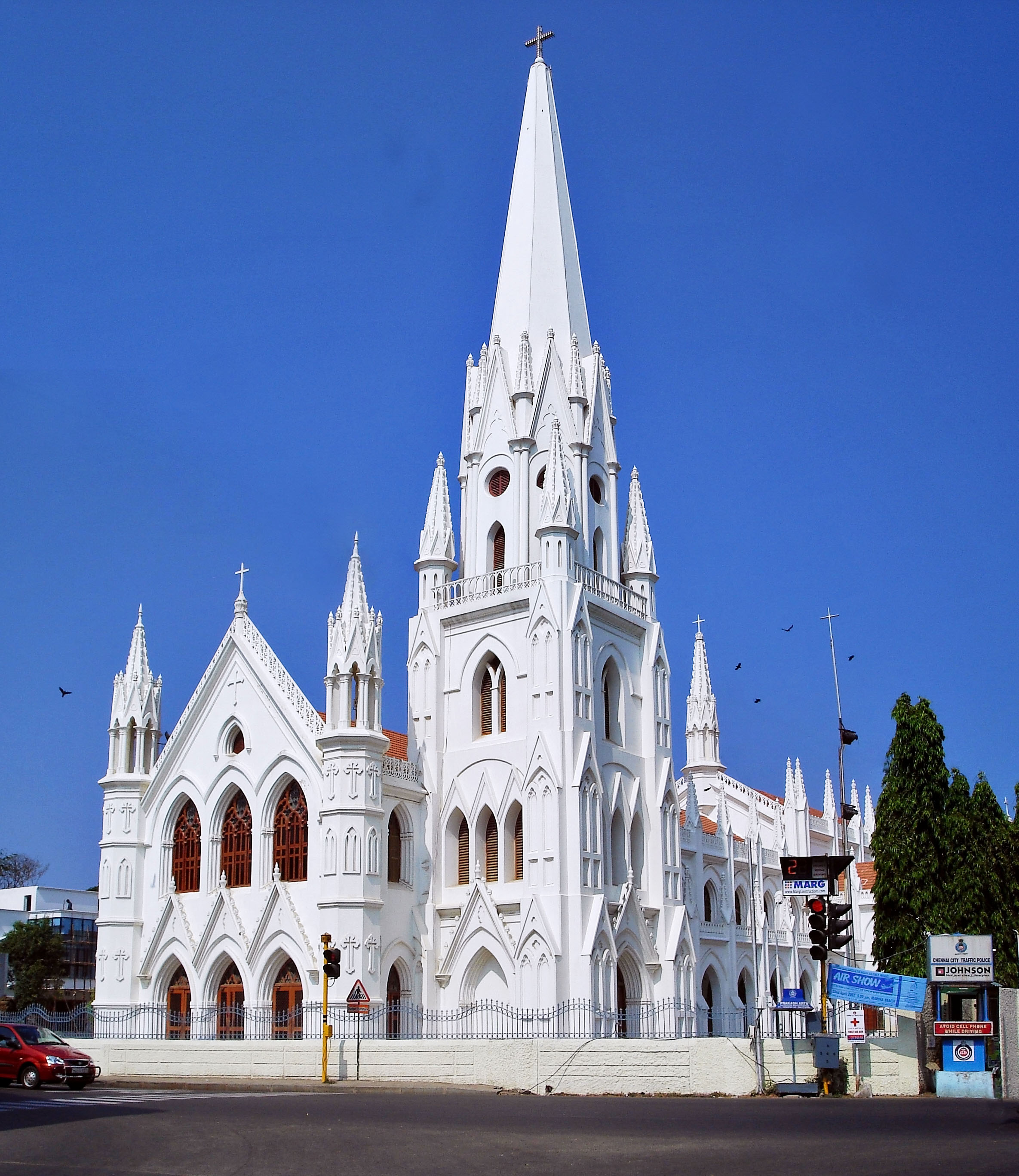
Santhome Basilica

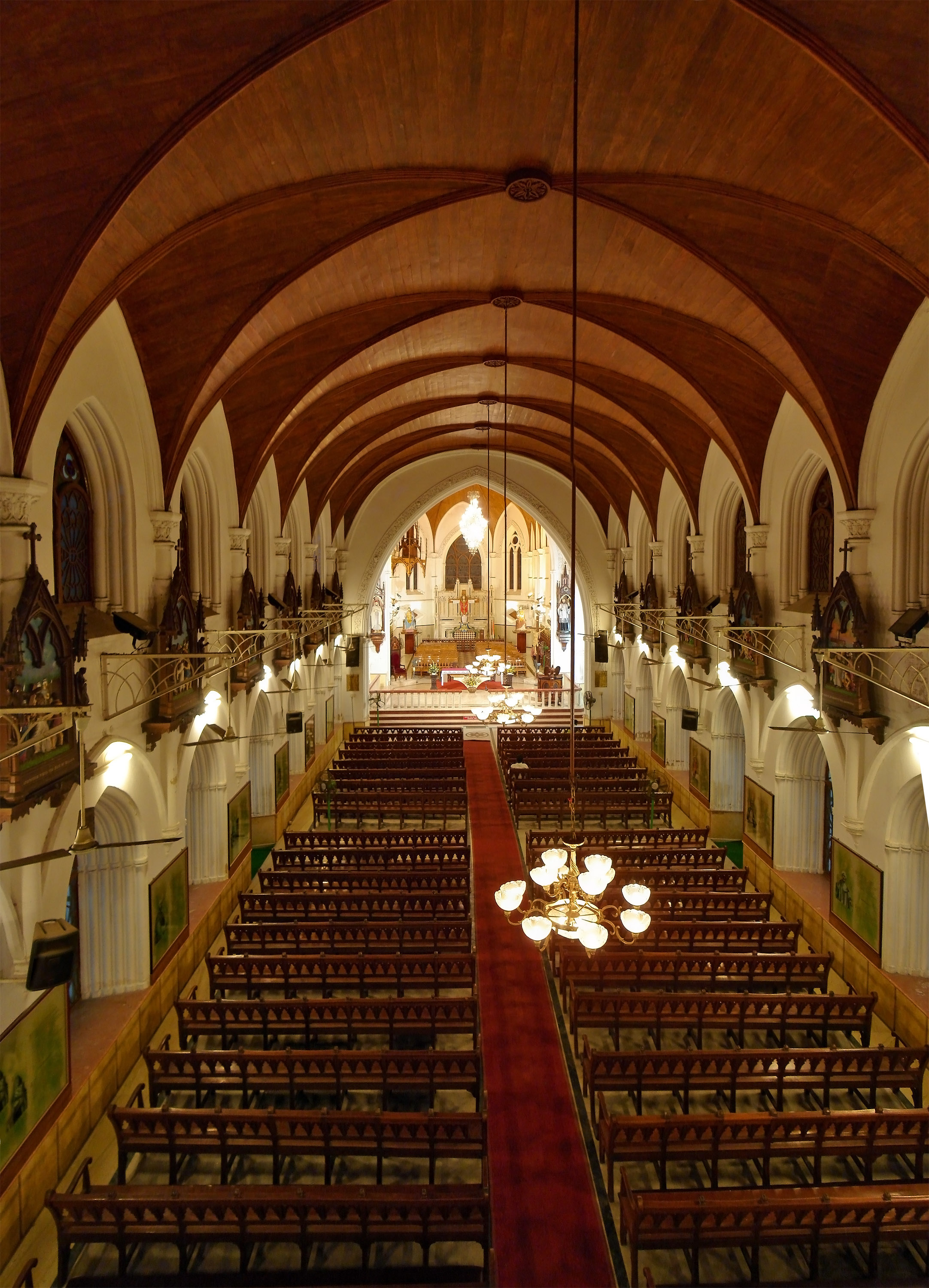
Interior of Santhome Basilica

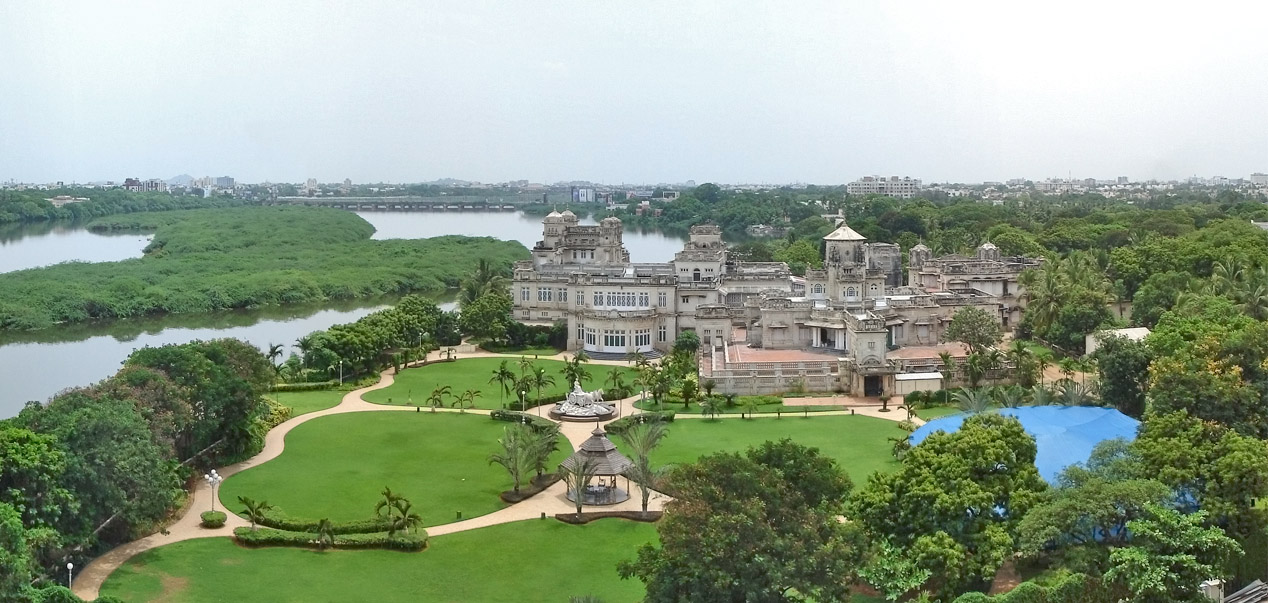
Chettinad Palace

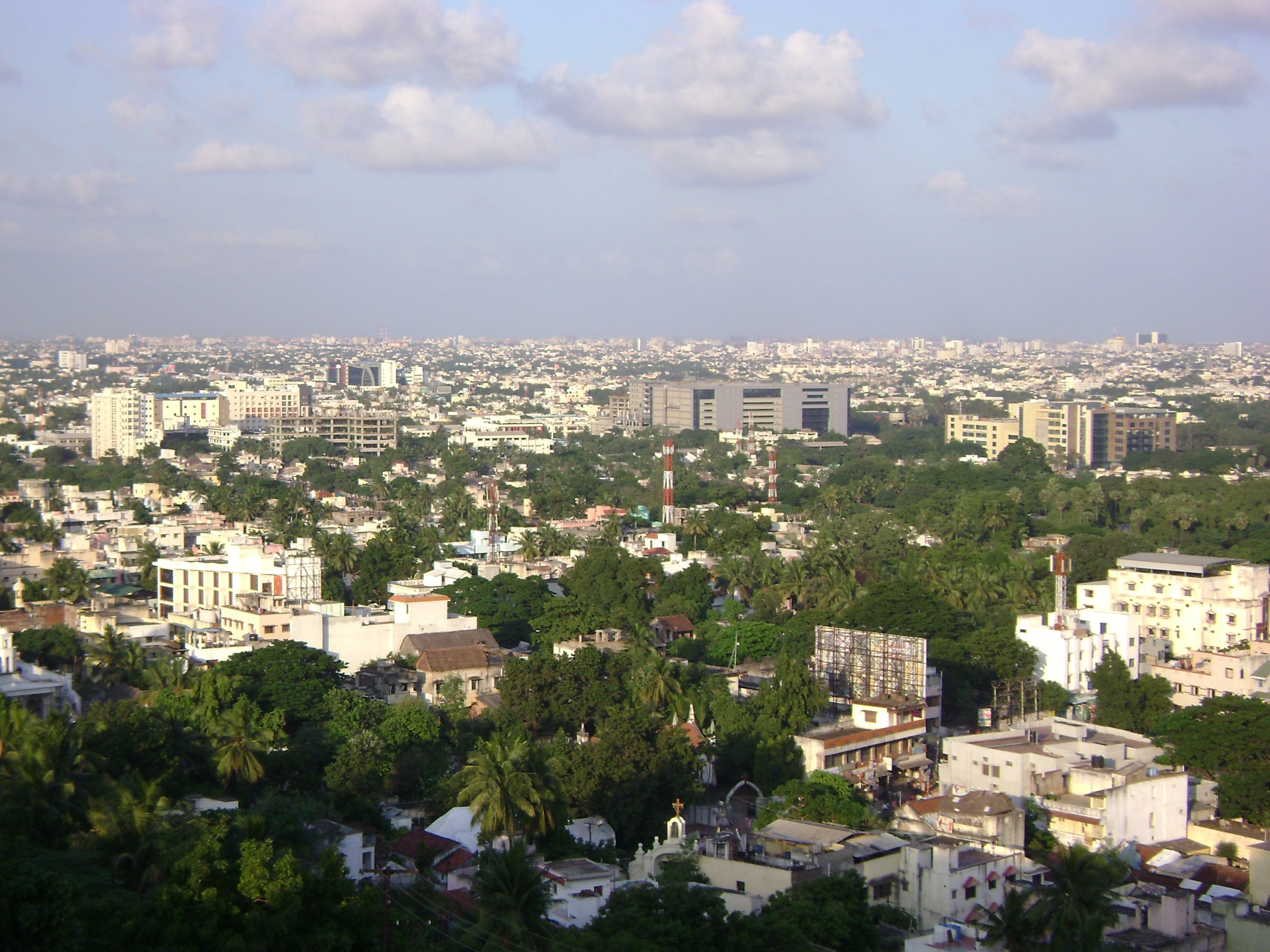
Chennai viewed from St. Thomas Mount

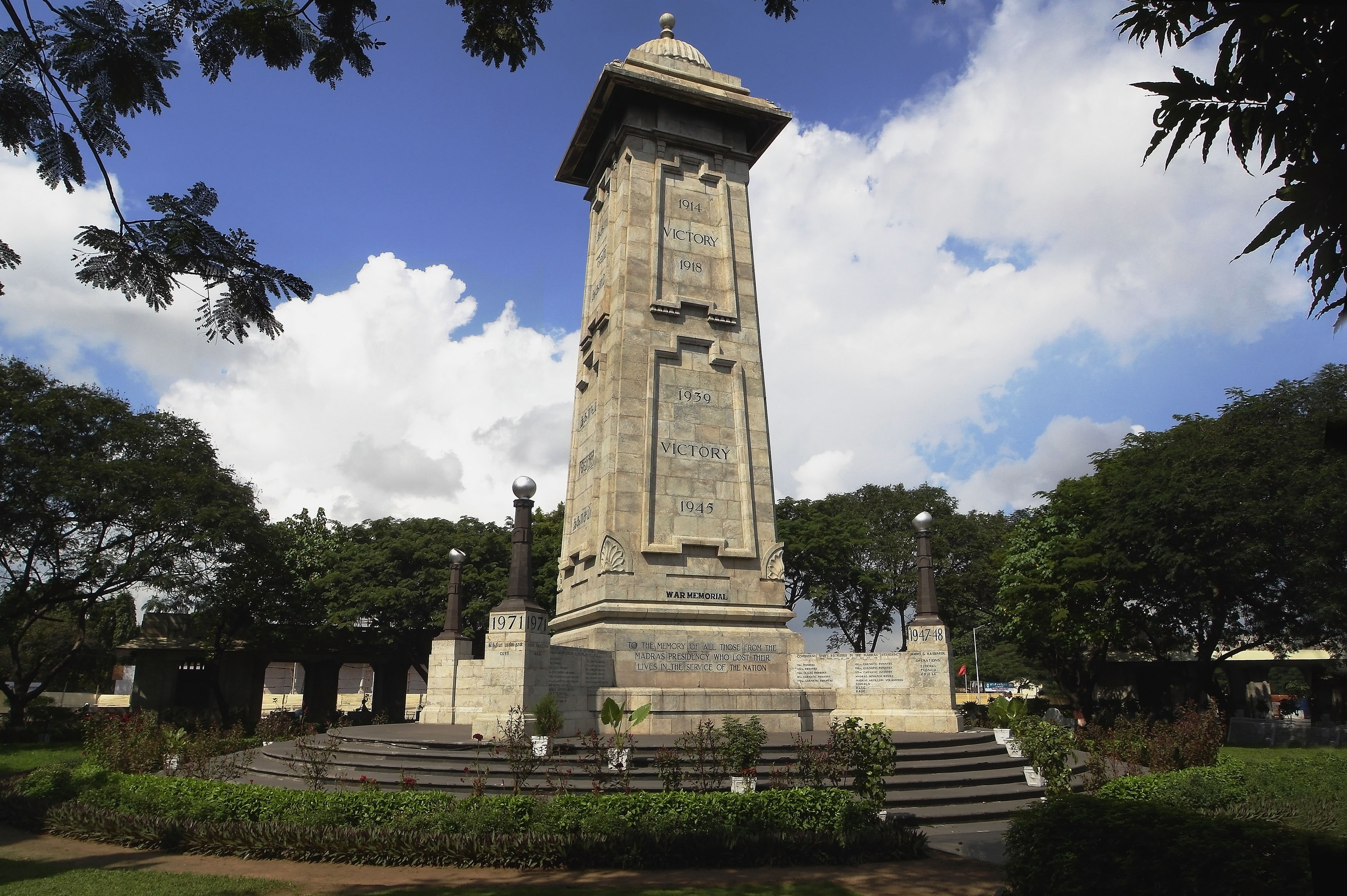
War Memorial

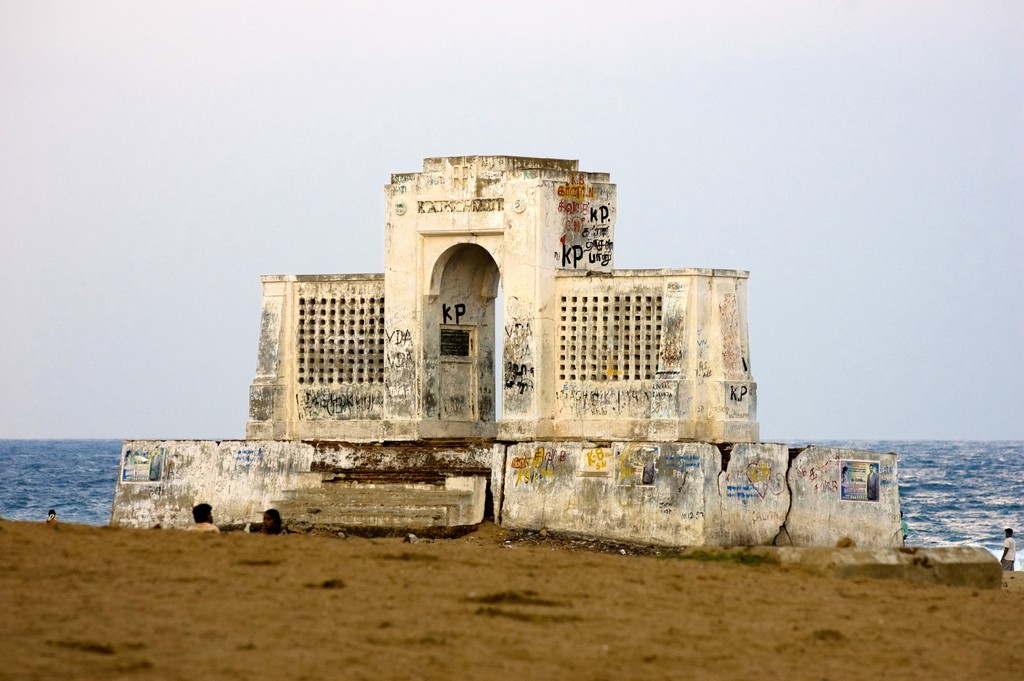
Schmidt memorial at Elliot's beach

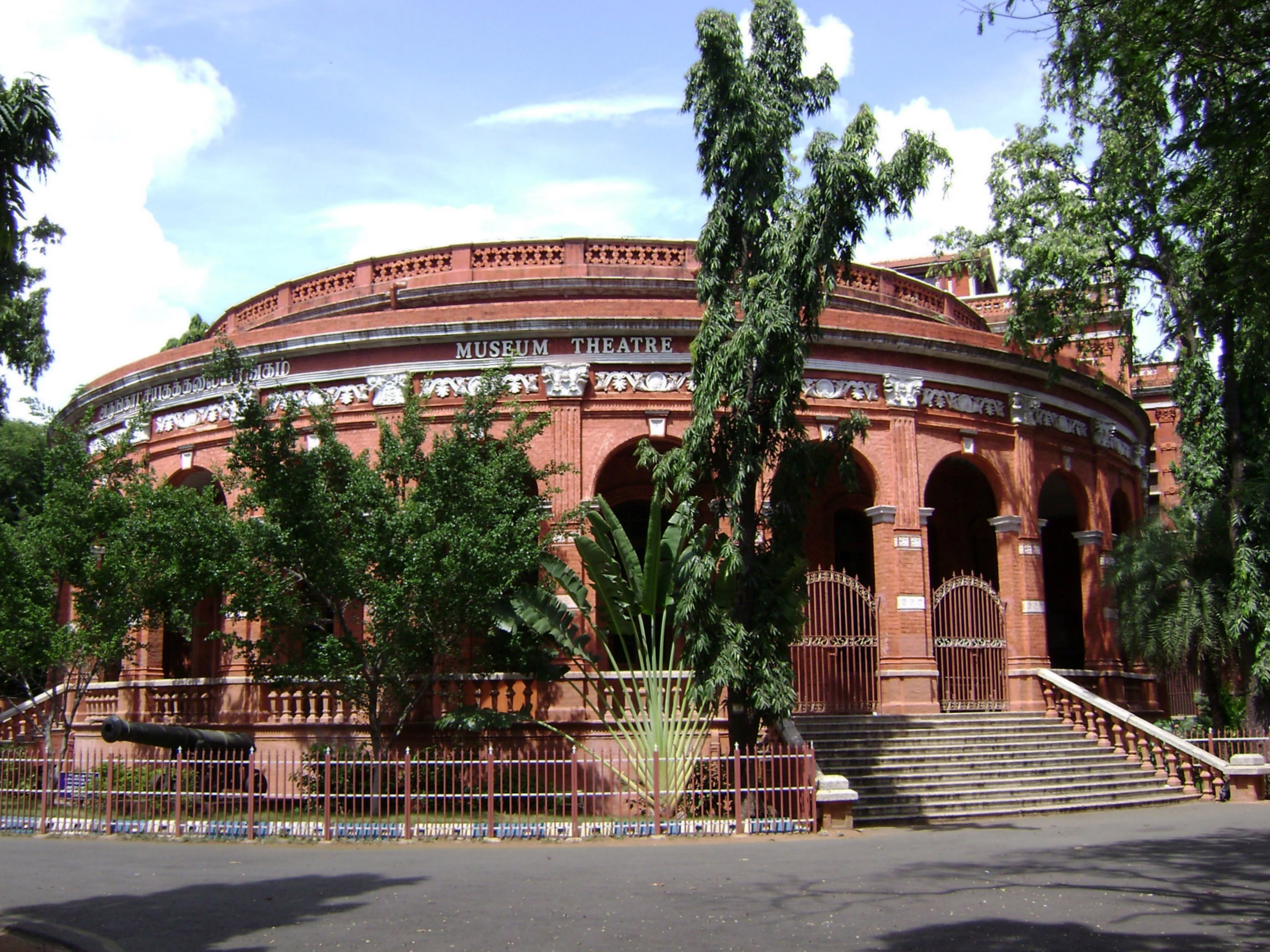
Government Museum at Egmore

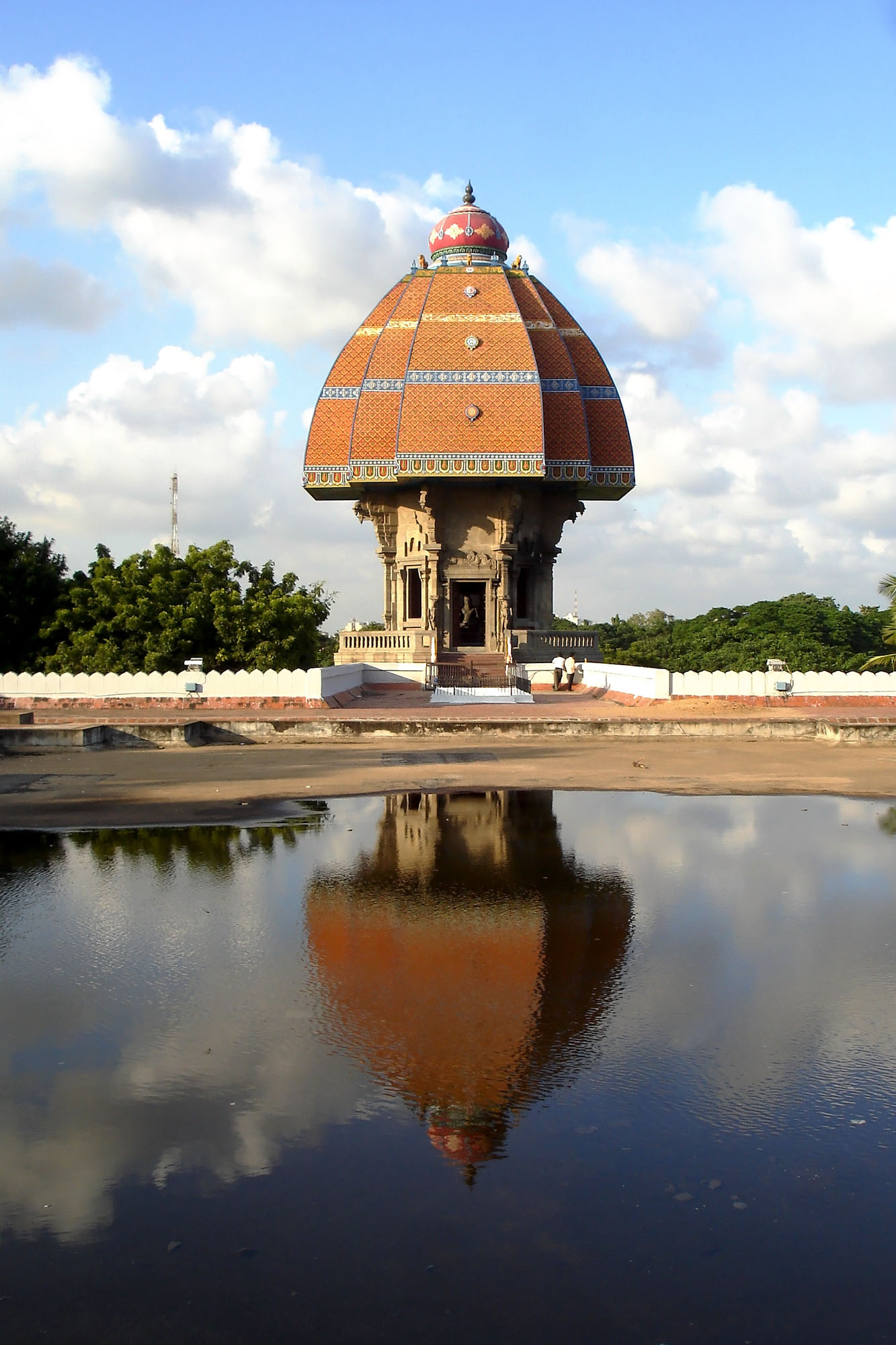
Valluvar Kottam

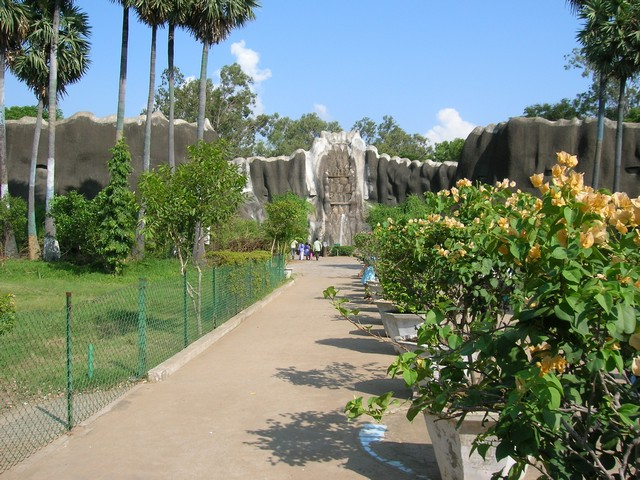
Aringar Anna Zoolological Park in Vandalur

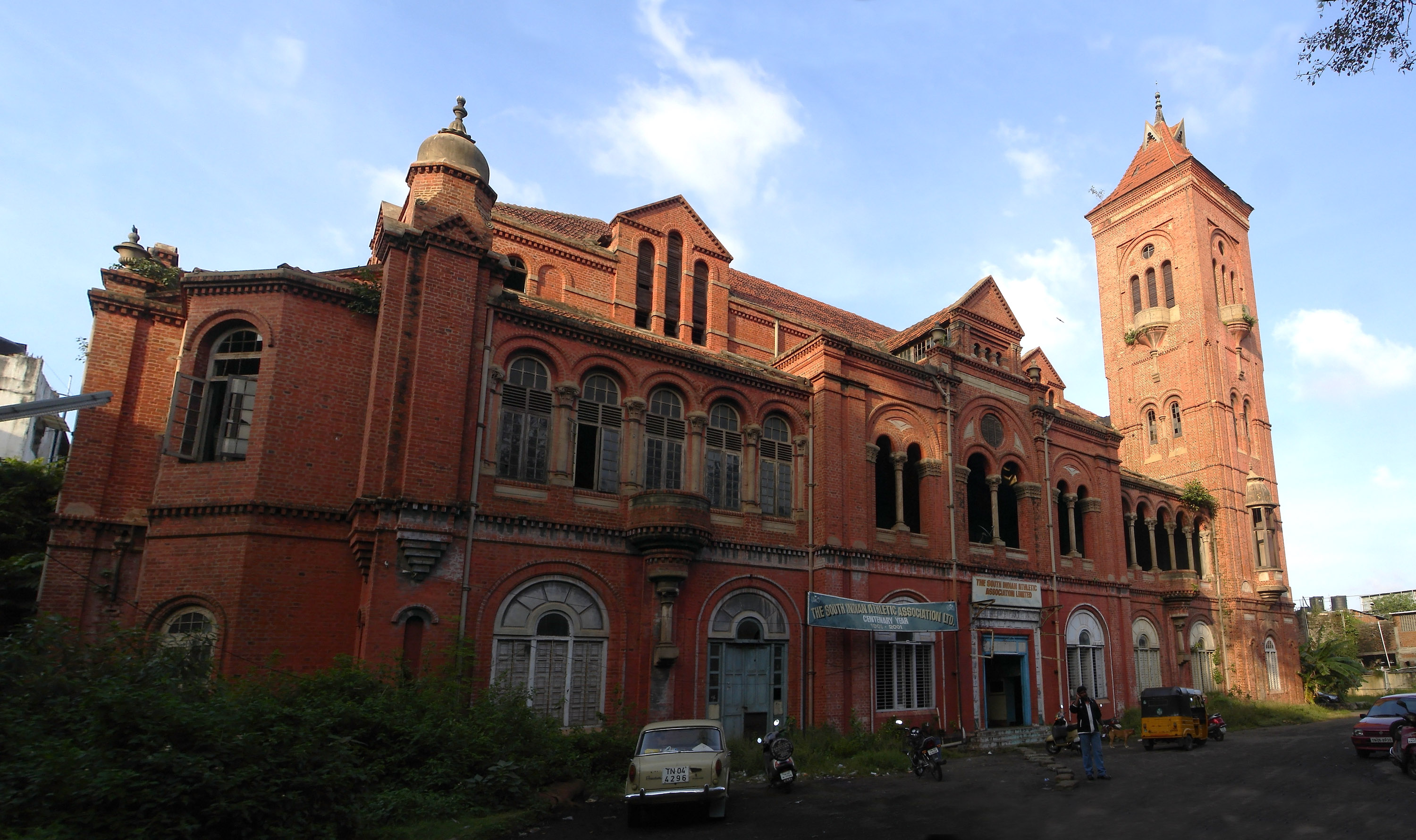
The Victoria Public Hall

== See also ==
- Hotels in Chennai
