= Elite Grand Hotel =

Luxury hotel in Chennai, India

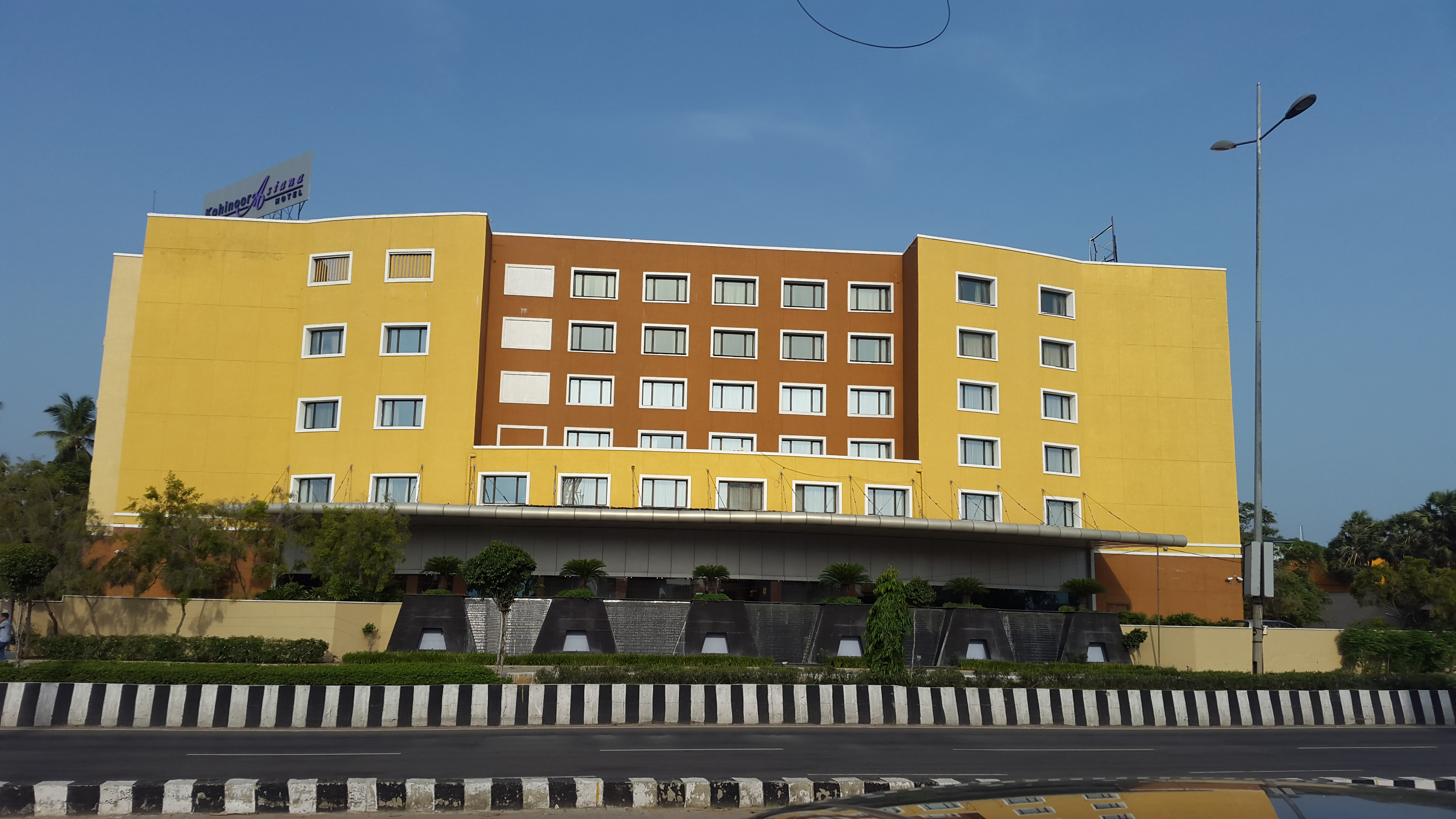
- Elite Grand Hotel
- Interactive map of the Elite Grand Hotel area

General information
- Location: India, 1/238 IT Expressway, Semmencherry; Chennai, Tamil Nadu 600 119
- Coordinates: 12°51′50″N 80°13′37″E
- Opening: October 2007
- Owner: Kohinoor Asiana Hotel

Other information
- Number of rooms: 179

Elite Grand Hotel (formerly called Kohinoor Asiana Hotel) is a five-star hotel located on Old Mahabalipuram Road in Semmencherry, Chennai, India.

== History ==
The hotel was built by Asiana Hotels Pvt Ltd at an investment of ₹ 1,000 million and was opened in October 2007 with 114 rooms. More rooms were added in 2012, increasing the total count to 178. The hotel was rebranded as “Elite Grand Hotel” in 2019.

== The hotel ==
The hotel is built on a 2.25-acre land. The hotel has five food and beverage venues, including an all-day multi-cuisine restaurant named Caramel, a specialty Thai restaurant named Silk, a specialty grill restaurant named Wild Fire, a lounge bar named i-Lounge, and a 24-hr café named Bytes. The hotel also has a Thai spa and fitness center and a Chettinad-style 14 m outdoor pool with an area of 1,800 sq ft and. It also has a 27,000 sq ft of meeting and banquet space with a total capacity of 2,500 persons, including a grand ballroom of 5,250 sq ft.

== Awards ==
In September 2008, Asiana Hotel won the overall ‘Best Hotel’ trophy at the Culinary Challenge and Exhibition 2008 held in Chennai by the Indian Federation of Culinary Association (IFCA).

== See also ==
- Hotels in Chennai
