= Raintree Hotel, St Mary's Road =

Luxury hotel in Chennai, India

The Raintree Hotel St Mary's Road
- Interactive map of the The Raintree Hotel; St Mary's Road area
- Hotel chain: Ceebros Hotels

General information
- Location: Chennai, India, 120, St Marys Road, Alwarpet; Chennai, Tamil Nadu 600 018
- Coordinates: 13°01′43″N 80°15′01″E
- Opening: June 2005

Height
- Height: 150 feet (46 m)

Technical details
- Floor count: 14
- Floor area: 80,000 sq ft

Design and construction
- Developer: C. Subba Reddy

Other information
- Number of rooms: 105
- Number of suites: 5
- Number of restaurants: 4

Website
- raintreehotels.com

The Raintree Hotel St. Mary's Road is a five-star hotel located at Alwarpet in Chennai, India. It is the fifth hotel in India, and the first in South India, to get an "Ecotel" certification.

== The Hotel ==
The Raintree Hotel has a total of 105 rooms. The hotel has multiple dining options 'The Colony', a multi-cuisine restaurant, 'Chap Chay', which specializes in Asian delicacies. It also has Havana Club, and Above Sea Level, a rooftop resto-bar located on the 14th floor. In addition to that the hotel has three banquet halls and two conference venues which measures to a total 4200 sq ft. The hotel also has rooftop pool and a health club.

== Awards ==
- Best Participating Team award by the Indian Federation of Culinary Association (IFCA) at the Culinary Challenge and Exhibition 2008, Chennai - September 2008.
- Golden Peacock Award (Environment Management); Presented by the World Council for Corporate Governance – 2008
- MMA Award for Managerial Excellence (Services Sector); Presented by the Madras Management Association – 2009
- Green Chariot Award; Presented by Rotary Club of Madras Southwest – 2010
- Audi Ritz Icon Award for Best Roof Top Restaurant (Above Sea Level Resto-Bar); Presented by Ritz – 2011
- Business Gaurav SME Award 2011- Hospitality; Presented by D & B – Axis Bank – 2011

== See also ==
- Hotels in Chennai
- List of tallest buildings in Chennai
