= Hilton Chennai =

Luxury hotel in Chennai, India

- Interactive map of the Hilton Chennai area
- Hotel chain: Hilton Hotels & Resorts

General information
- Location: India, 124/1, Jawaharlal Nehru Road, Chennai, Guindy, Tamil Nadu 600 032
- Coordinates: 13.016731°N 80.204996°E
- Opening: 28 February 2011
- Owner: Empee Hotels Limited
- Operator: Hilton Worldwide

Technical details
- Floor count: 9

Design and construction
- Architects: Wimberley Allison Tong & Goo (WATG)

Other information
- Number of rooms: 204

Website
- Official Website

Hilton Chennai is a five-star luxury hotel located on Jawaharlal Nehru Road at Guindy, Chennai, India. It is located next to the Olympia Technology Park and close to the Kathipara Junction. Built in the Indo-Saracenic style with an initial investment of ₹ 4,000 million, it is Hilton's fourth Indian property after Hilton (Janakpuri), Hilton Garden Inn (Saket), both in New Delhi, and Hilton Mumbai International Airport. and was inaugurated by Indian Overseas Bank Chairman and Managing Director M. Narendra on 28 February 2011.

== The hotel ==
The 10-storied hotel is built on a 42-ground land and has 204 rooms, including 2 Executive Suites, 16 Junior Suite, 7 Hilton Deluxe Room, 58 Hilton Executive Rooms, 121 Hilton King Guest Rooms. The interiors were designed by Hong Kong's DiLeonardo and Dallas-based Wilson and Associates. There are 5 food and beverage offerings at the hotel, namely, Ayna (pan-Indian restaurant), Vintage Bank (wine and cheese bar), Q Bar (a rooftop bar and grill), Vasco (an all-day dining global cuisine restaurant with live kitchens on the third floor) and Est (24 hour contemporary cafe and lounge).

The first floor has divisible 445 m^{2} ballroom, two meeting rooms, and a boardroom with latest audio visual technology. The ballroom, named the Hilton Grand Ballroom, has a ceiling height of 5.9 m and can hold 750 people.

The rooftop features an outdoor 15-foot by 80-foot (25 m) infinity swimming pool designed in such a way that guests can gaze at the cityscape while swimming laps.

Along with all this, Hilton Chennai also showcases a 24-hour Fitness Center by Precor along with an Executive Lounge located on the fourth floor.

== Architecture ==
The exterior design of the hotel originally consisted of arches and cornices reminiscent of traditional Indian architecture. The hotel appointed SRSS Architects to redesign the building's exterior envelope. The new design was thus modified to include a palette of polished granite, metal accents, Indian Jali screens, and custom light fixtures featuring Indian motifs. The interior was designed by DiLeonardo Hospitality Design.

== See also ==
- Hotels in Chennai
- List of tallest buildings in Chennai
