= World Bank office, Chennai =

Extension of the World Bank headquartered in Washington, DC.

Coordinates: 12°59′2″N 80°14′41″E

World Bank Back Office, Chennai
- World Bank, Chennai

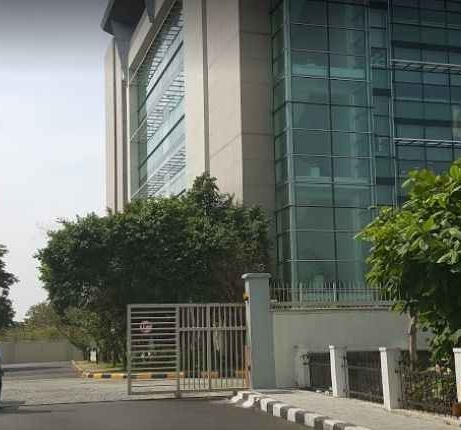
- World Bank Office in Chennai

Agency overview
- Formed: August 2001 (operations began); 15 March 2002(official launch)
- Headquarters: Washington, DC
- Employees: 1200 (2021)
- Parent agency: World Bank
- Website: World Bank

The World Bank Chennai is the extension of the World Bank headquartered in Washington, DC. The World Bank Chennai office offers corporate financial, accounting, administrative and IT services for the bank's offices in around 150 countries. The Chennai office handles several value-added operations of the bank that were earlier handled only in its Washington, D.C., office.

== History ==
The Chennai office started its business operation as a primary processing work, including payroll processing, in August 2001 with 80 staff. On 15 March 2002, then chief minister of Tamil Nadu, J. Jayalalithaa, inaugurated a new 26,000 sq ft office in Raheja Towers in Anna Salai, where the bank started functioning in a full-fledged manner to process all of the bank's accounting functions and its global payrolls, with about 90 personnel. The same year, the staff strength increased to about 180. In 2003, the bank decided to move the analytical work in bond valuation to the Chennai office, whereby the bank moved the work outside its headquarters in Washington, DC for the first time in its history. The size of the bank's commercial bonds portfolio is estimated at US$100 billion. On 22 September 2006, the bank moved to a leased premises in Taramani, which was inaugurated by the then chief minister of Tamil Nadu, M. Karunanidhi. In 2009, the bank decided to purchase the land it took on lease, in order to set up a permanent back office in Chennai. By 2012, the staff strength grew to 500. On 13 December 2021, the bank celebrated the 20th year of its presence in Chennai.

The staff strength of the Chennai office grew as follows:

Year	No. of staff
2001	80
2002	90
2003	180
2006	240
2012	500
2021	1200

== Operations ==
The World Bank Chennai office building is located in Taramani on a 3.5-acre campus off the IT corridor and has 120,000 sq feet built-up area with a capacity to house about 450 staff members. The building is certified as a LEED Silver building. The Taramani office, measuring 128,000 sq ft area, is the largest bank-owned building outside its headquarters in Washington, DC.

Most of the administrative expense and trust fund transactions for the Bank, which range between US$1 billion and US$2 billion a year, are processed in the Chennai office. When the bank commenced its Chennai operations, it was primarily restricted to processing. An analysis component was added later.

== See also ==
- Economy of Chennai
