= ITC Grand Chola Hotel =

Luxury hotel in Chennai, India

Coordinates: 13.010574°N 80.220194°E

ITC Grand Chola
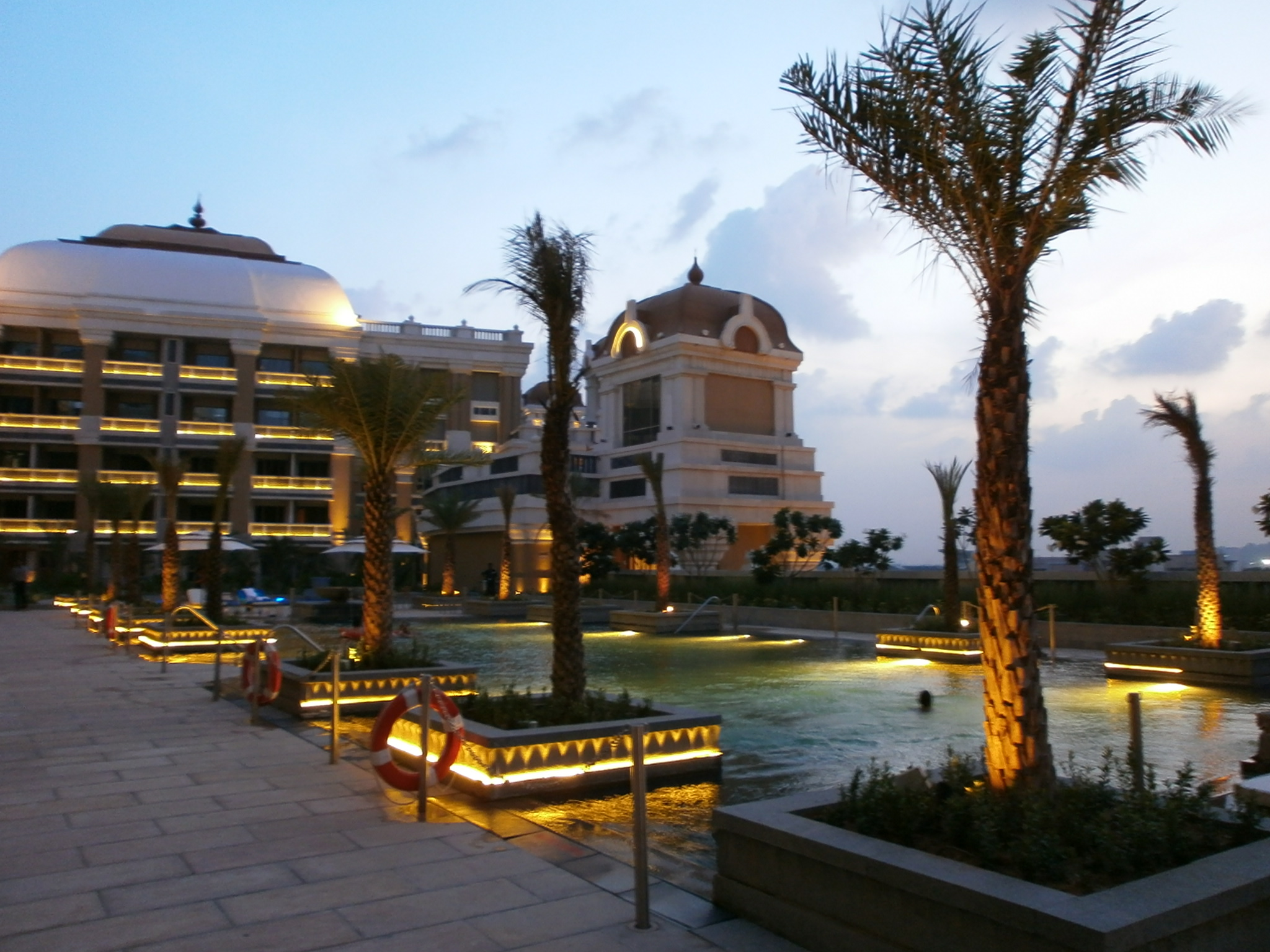
- Interactive map of the ITC Grand Chola area
- Hotel chain: ITC Welcomgroup Hotels, Palaces and Resorts

General information
- Location: Chennai, Tamil Nadu, India, 63, Anna Salai, Guindy; Chennai, Tamil Nadu 600 032
- Opening: 15 September 2012
- Owner: ITC Hotels
- Operator: ITC Welcomgroup

Height
- Height: 49 m (161 ft)

Technical details
- Floor count: 10
- Floor area: 1,624,000-square-foot (150,900 m^{2})

Design and construction
- Architect: SRSS Architects (Singapore)
- Developer: Larsen & Toubro
- Structural engineer: Sterling Engineering Consultancy Services (Mumbai)

Other information
- Number of rooms: 600
- Number of suites: 14
- Number of restaurants: 10
- Parking: 800 cars

Website
- itchotels.com/grandchola-chennai

The ITC Grand Chola is a high-end luxury hotel in Chennai, India. It is located in Guindy, opposite SPIC building and along the same row of buildings as Ashok Leyland Towers. The building, designed by Singapore-based SRSS Architects, is of mixed-use development with three separate wings and is themed after traditional Dravidian architecture of the Chola dynasty. The hotel is the ninth hotel in The Luxury Collection brand.

The hotel, built on over 1,600,000 sq ft, is dubbed the largest stand-alone hotel in the country built with an investment of ₹ 12,000 million and has the largest convention centre in the country built on 100,000 sq ft with a 30,000-sq ft pillar-less ballroom. In terms of room inventory, with 600 rooms, it is the third largest hotel in India after Renaissance Mumbai Convention Centre Hotel – now rebranded as The Westin Mumbai Powai Lake (759 rooms) and Grand Hyatt (694 rooms), both in Mumbai.

== History ==
ITC Limited started its Hotels division in Madras (Chennai) with their first hotel, the Chola Sheraton, which is now rebranded as Welcomhotel Chennai. In 2000, ITC Hotels Group bought the 8-acre land at the Campa Cola campus on Anna Salai for ₹ 800 million. As part of a major investment plan announced by the then chairman, Y. C. Deveshwar, the hotel was planned at an initial cost of ₹ 8,000-10,000 million. The hotel was inaugurated on 15 September 2012 by the Chief Minister of Tamil Nadu, J. Jayalalithaa. The signature restaurant concept 'Peshawri' moved address from the erstwhile Sheraton Chola to the ITC Grand Chola with the opening of the latter.

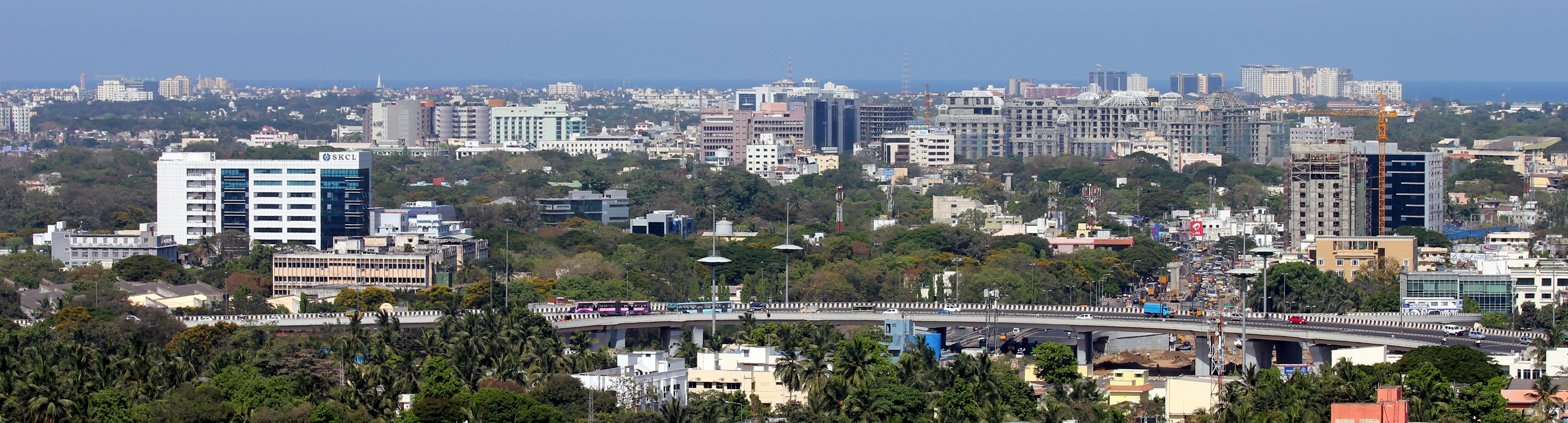
Guindy skyline showing the hotel under construction

ITC Grand Chola became the largest hotel in the world to achieve the LEED Zero Carbon Certification. When COVID-19 pandemic outbreak in Chennai, then 85 peoples from the hotel got tested for positive. Since, the pandemic got under control, the new year eve was celebrated in the hotel. In 2019, the hotel hosted the meeting of Narendra Modi and Xi Jinping.

== Architecture ==
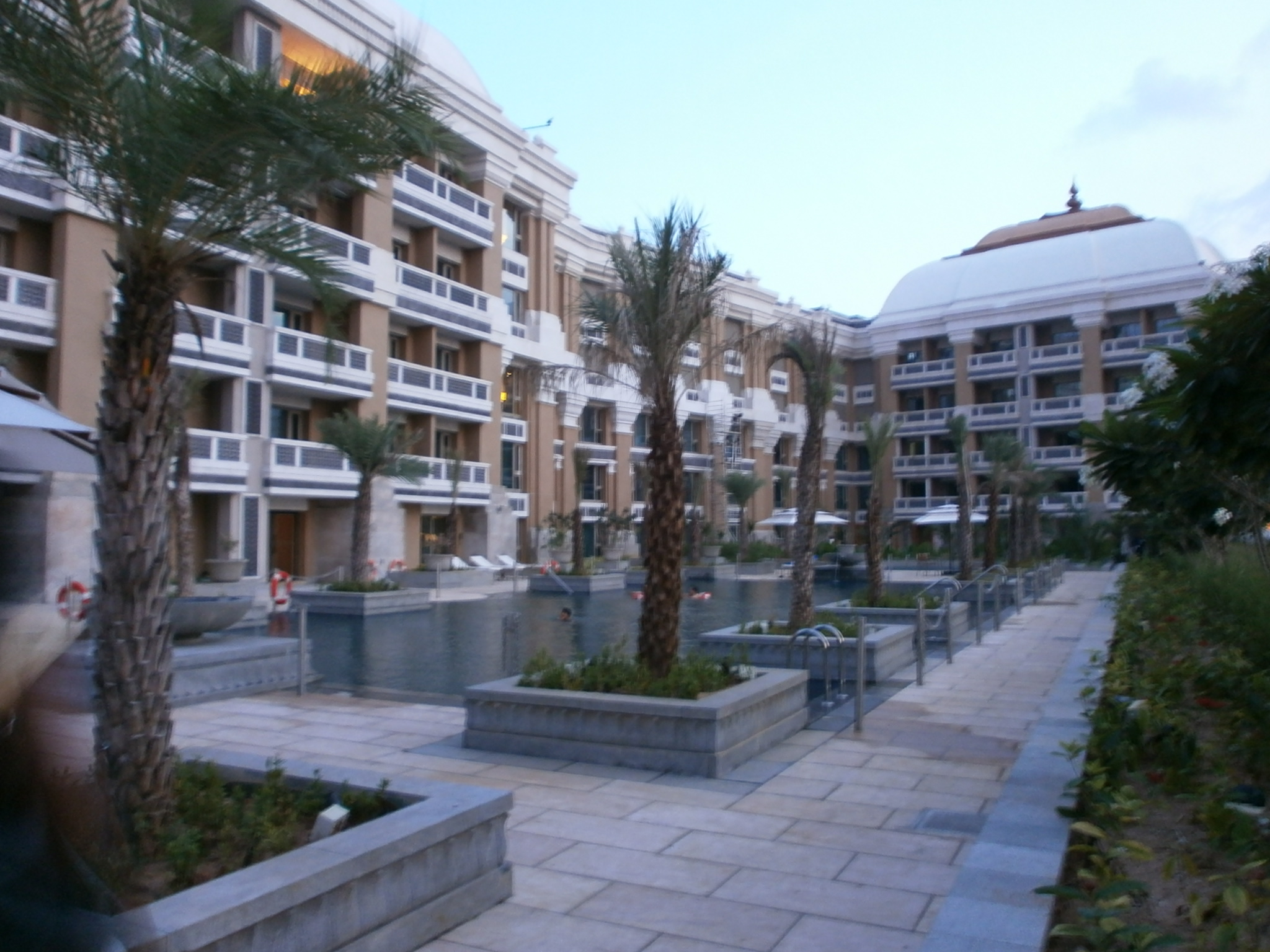
Inside at a walking ground in the hotel

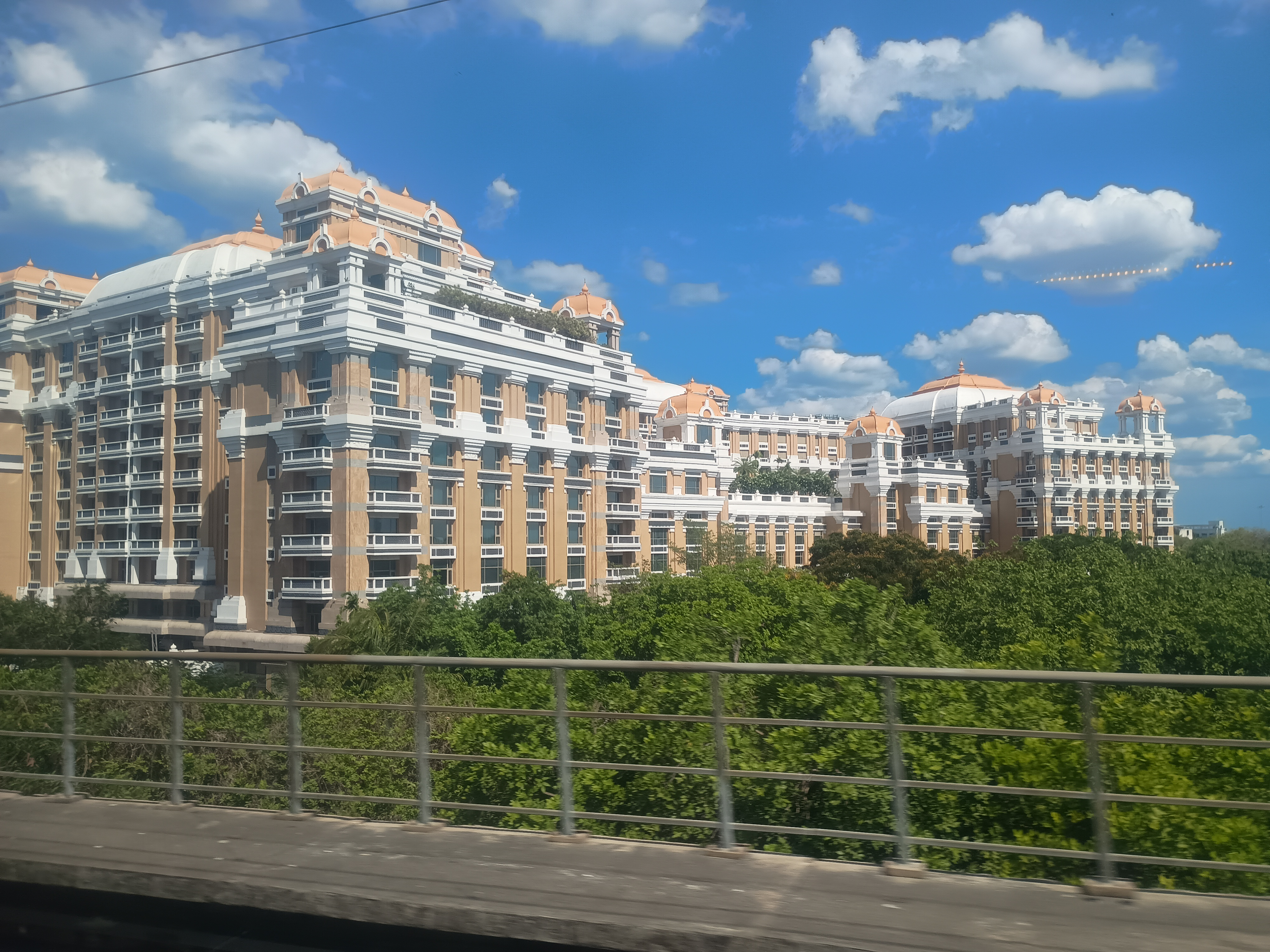
ITC Grand Chola Hotel, June 2026, view from Chennai Metro

The hotel is built in South Indian temple architecture and has four entrances similar to the temples in South India, accordingly named as 'Vallavan' (North), 'Sembiyan' (East), 'Killi' (South), and 'Chola' (West). There are 43 single bed room, 33 double bed room, and 2 triple bed room apartments. Other features similar to the temples include tall pillars, grand columns, and sweeping staircases.

The white and soft-cream floral motifs in close clusters in the hotel, found on the walls, ceilings, and pillars, such as the sunflower motif in the portico and the kolam-inspired motifs in the food and beverage areas, are themed after the Chola empire, which ruled parts of South India and South-East Asia from 300 BCE to 1250 CE. The bronze horse in front of the lobby is based on the one that was yoked to the chariots of the Chola kings. The marble walls are interspersed with panels of carvings of the wheel of life, the four-petalled flower, and are echoed in the etchings on the glass doors leading to the rooms and lounge area.

The architectural theme is reinforced with 462 pillars, most of them with hand-carved design work inspired by the Brihadeeshwara temple of Tanjore. The hotel has over 1 million square feet of marble with 57 varieties of the stone, for which the company bought a marble quarry in whole in Italy and shipped several tonnes of the stone to Chennai for the construction. The hotel has 7 lounges, and the average room size is 625 sq ft. The intricate stonework in the building were created by 4,000 artisans from Mamallapuram who worked on site. The overall construction of the hotel took five years to complete.

== Green features ==
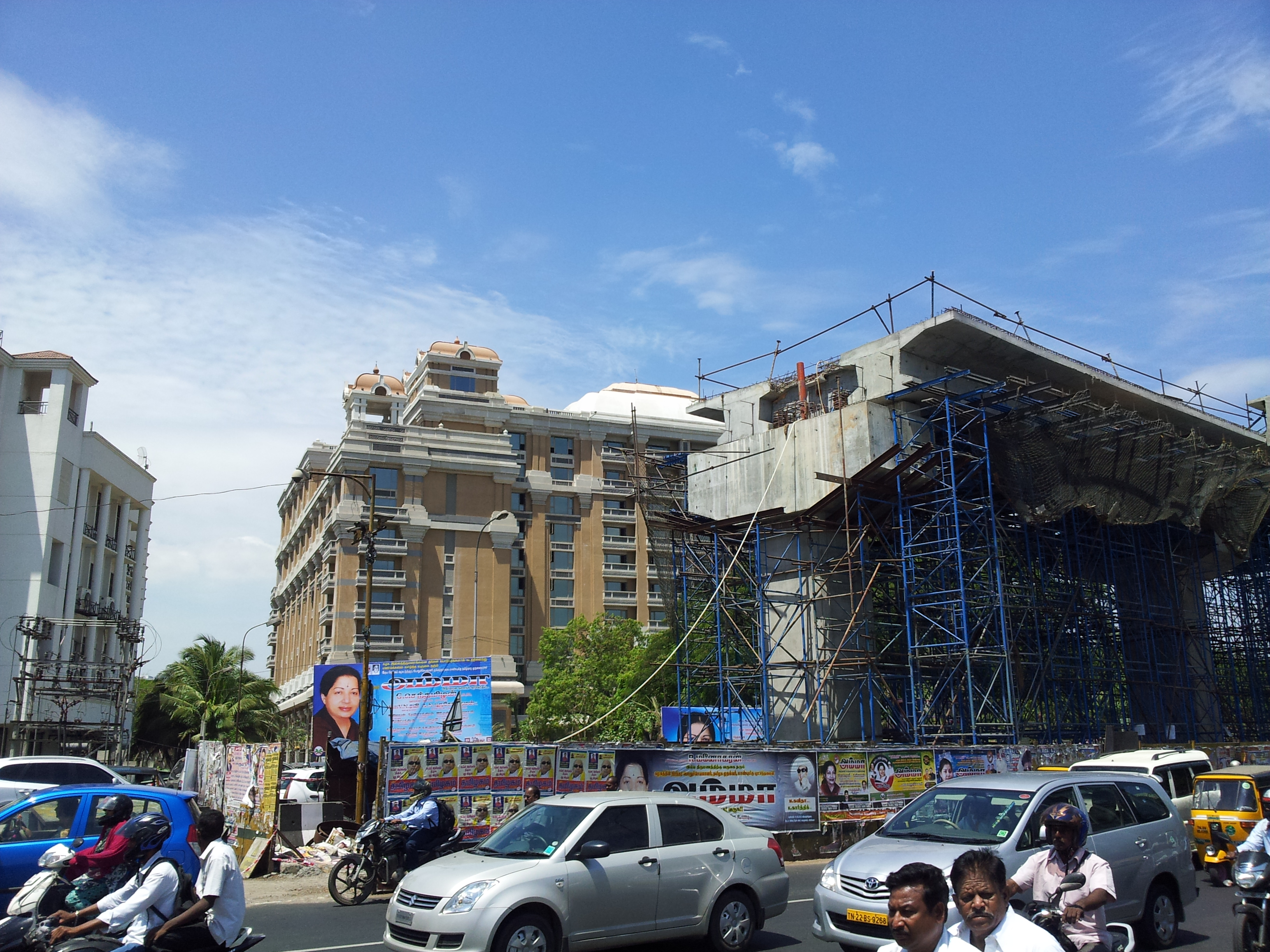
Construction of the Chennai Metro line in front of the hotel

The hotel avoided cutting down trees at the property ever since the pre-construction phase by transplanting all the existing trees around the hotel. Of the building material value of the hotel project, over 10 percent is composed of recycled raw materials, over 40 percent is composed of materials manufactured and/or extracted within a radius of 800 km, and over 5 percent is made of plant products that are typically harvested with a 10-year span or shorter. During construction of the hotel complex, about 17 percent of Portland cement by weight was replaced by flyash. Over 50 percent of the wood products used in the construction of the hotel are from Forest Stewardship Council (FSC)–certified forests.

With its own solar and wind farms, the whole of the hotel's energy requirements are met through renewable sources, including waste water. The hotel saves over 40 percent of energy by means of various energy efficiency features. A 12.6-MW windmill caters to the power requirement of the hotel complex, the excess of which is contributed to the Tamil Nadu Electricity Board. The heating, ventilation and air conditioning in the complex are optimally controlled using a technology known as Hartman Loop. The envelope materials of the building comprising composite wall assembly, multi-glazed windows, and roof-top insulation, well exceed the fenestration standards of ASHRAE/ECBC. The roof is a combination of green roof, and the reflective paints and high SRI finish on the domes of the complex reduce thermal gradient differences after daylight hours. The hotel also has independent, programmable lighting controls installed in each area. Water is heated by means of solar concentrators. The hotel uses water-cooled refrigerants in place of air-cooled ones. Energy is saved by means of a jet fan ventilation system.

All of the water requirements for irrigation, flushing, and cooling tower is met through treated effluent. The water-efficient fixtures in the complex is estimated to reduce the water usage in the hotel by 35 percent compared with conventional benchmarks. The external pervious areas and green roofs along with water-harvesting structures will retain all of storm-water catchment on-site. Waste generated by the hotel is completely recycled by waste segregation at source and utilisation for useful purposes. The hotel has an onsite organic waste converter, capable of converting all of the organic waste produced daily into manure, installed.

== Facilities ==
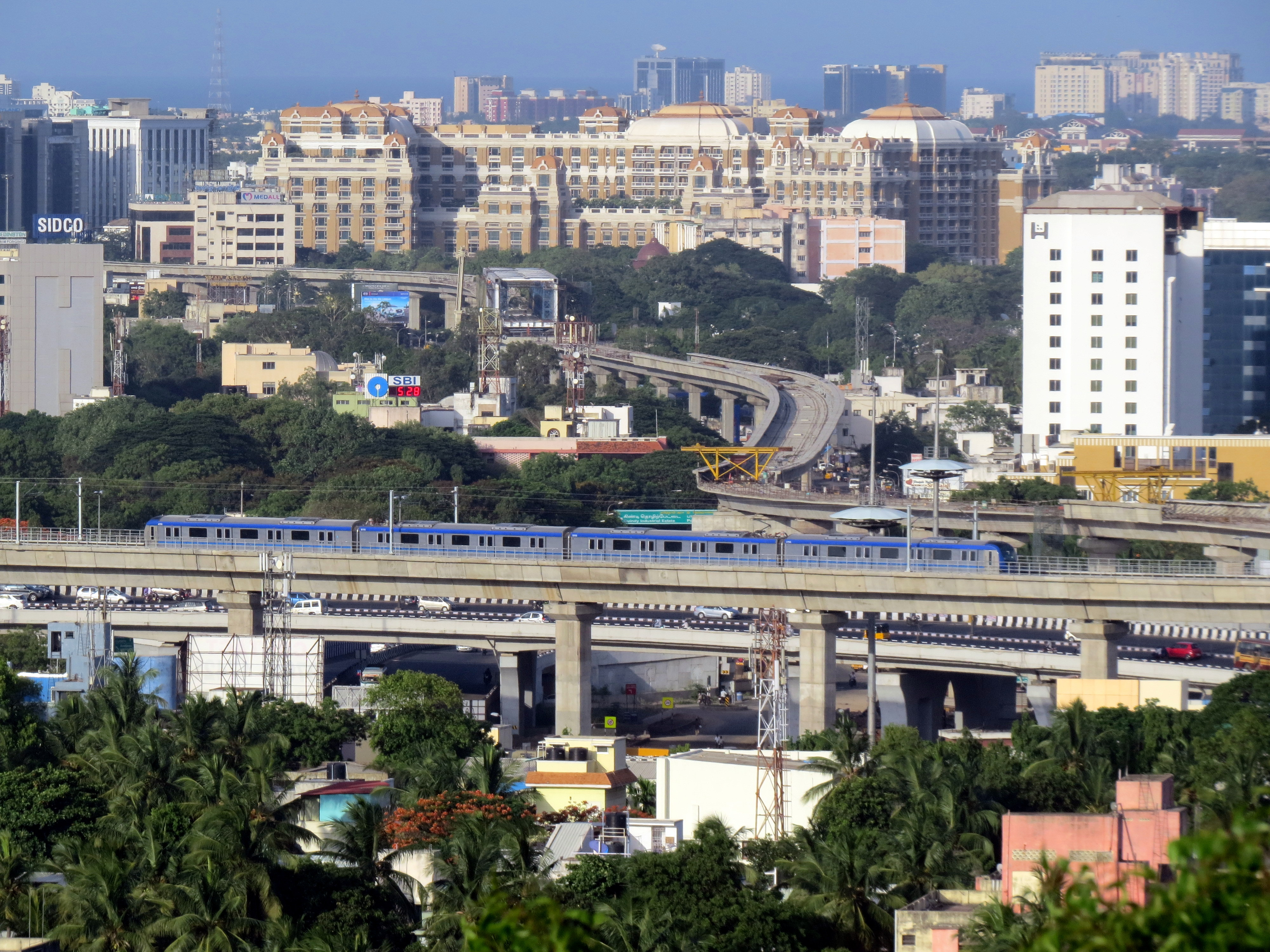
Grand Chola (centre), amidst surrounding buildings

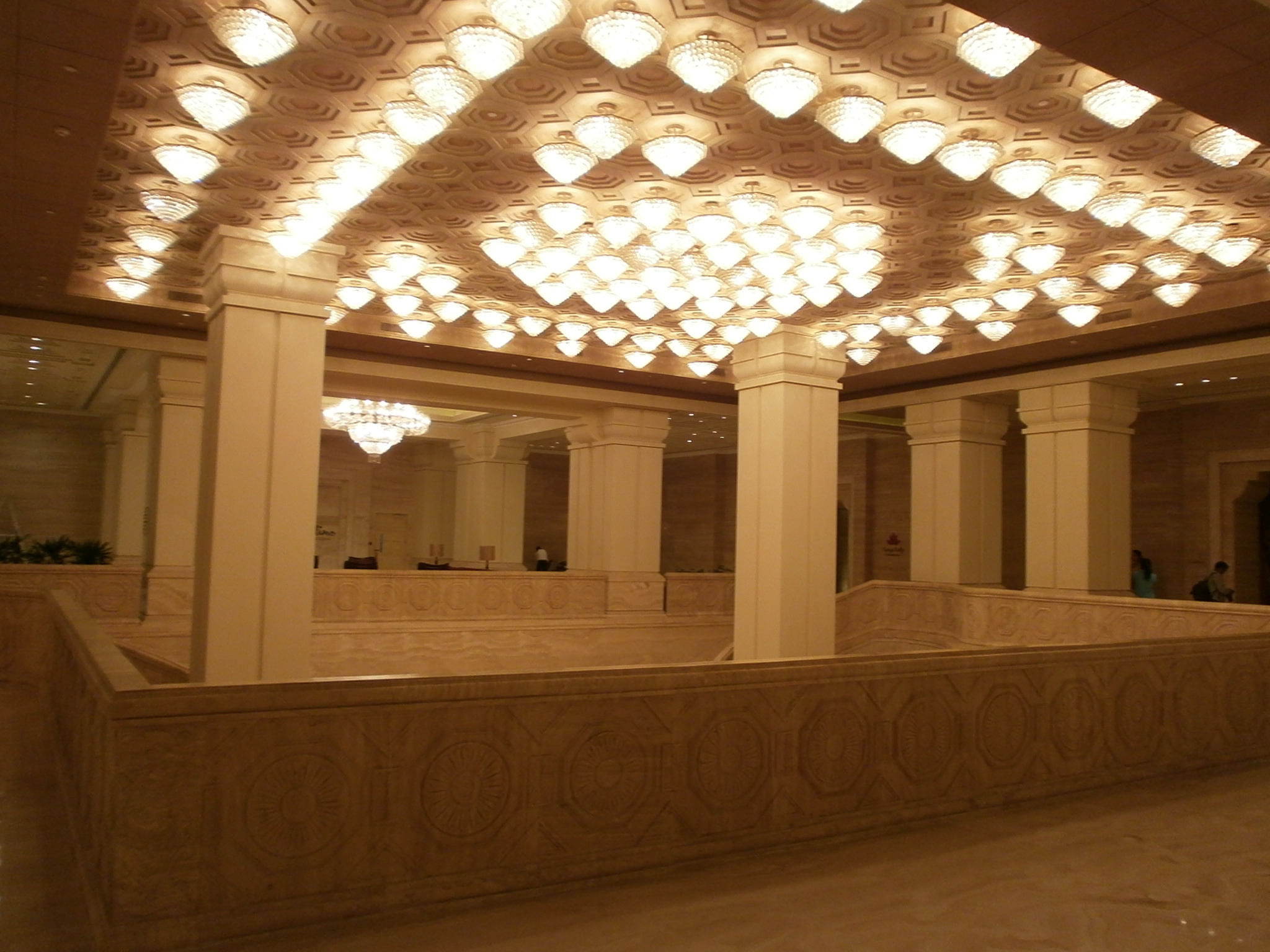
A lit hall in the hotel

The hotel has 600 rooms and features 1,600,000-square-foot (150,000 m^{2}) of built area, 75,000-square-foot (7,000 m^{2}) of retail space and 100,000 square feet (9,300 m^{2}) of conference and exhibition facilities, which includes a pillar-less main ballroom of 26,540 sq ft named the Rajendra Hall, which can accommodate 5,000 guests. The ballroom is a stand-alone structure gently sloping into a carpeted area. The total area of the ballroom, including the pillar-less portion, is 55,000 sq ft. The hotel also has a 48-seater preview theater. The hotel covers 1.5 million square foot area on an eight-acre plot. Of the 8 acres, about 10 percent has been given to the Chennai Metropolitan Development Authority (CMDA) as part of the Open Space Reservation that has been taken over by the Chennai Corporation. The hotel has been designed by the Singapore-based SRSS Architects and the local architects is CRN.

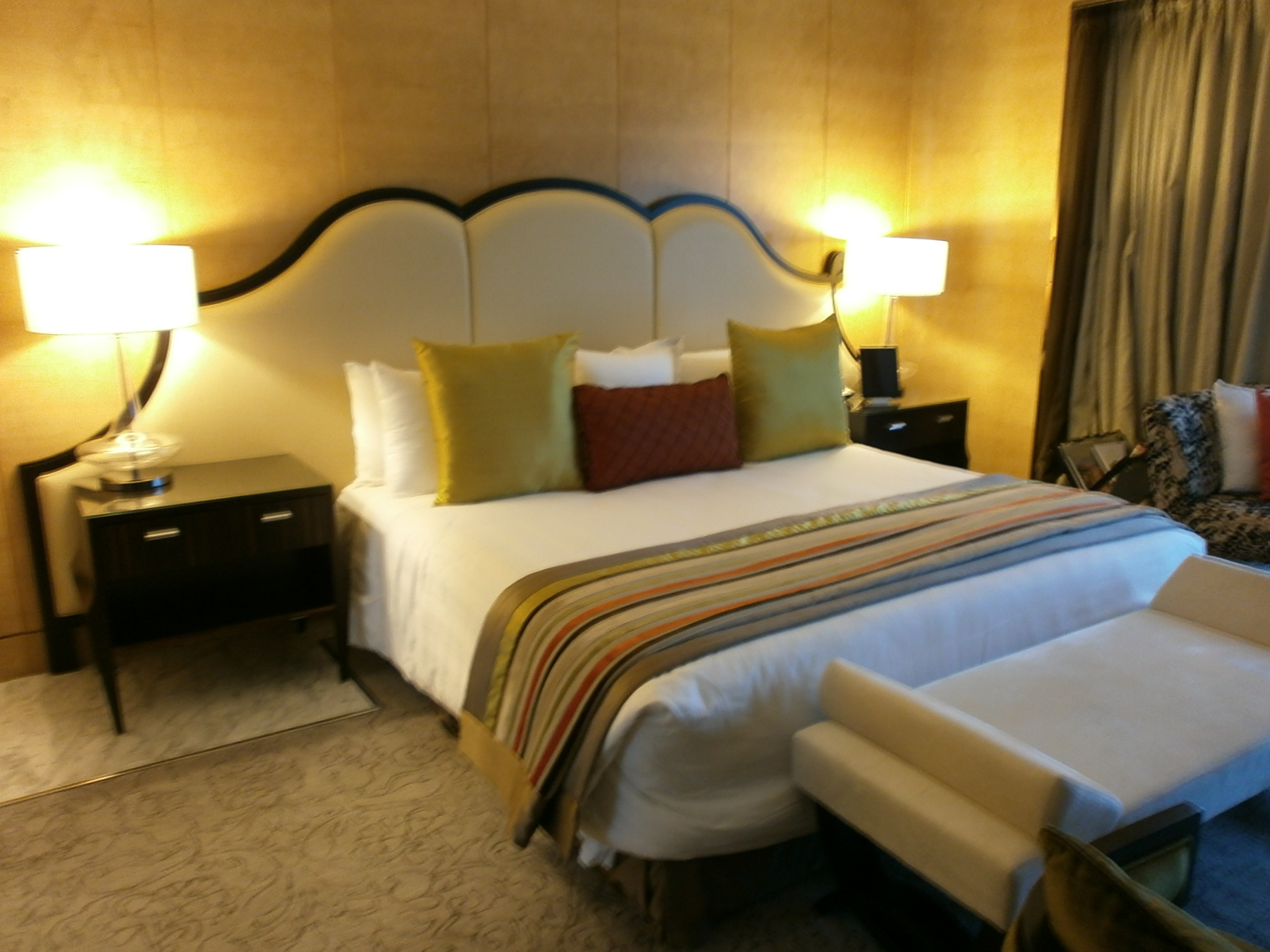
A typical room at the hotel

The hotel's 600 rooms include 522 rooms and 78 serviced apartments. The rooms include 326 Executive Club rooms, 31 Eva rooms, 132 Towers rooms, 48 ITC One rooms, 14 Deluxe Suites each measuring 1,164 sq ft, a presidential suite named the Karikalan Suite and a six-bay grand presidential suite named the Rajaraja Chola Suite spread over 4,380 sq ft. The single rooms occupy an area of 615 sq ft with exclusive lounge and private butler, and a distinct wing—named the Eva wing—for female guests spanning the entire wing of the second floor, with rooms measuring 405 sq ft. The hotel has three wings: the first or primary wing houses all Executive Club rooms, and the second wing contains ITC One rooms, Towers rooms and all the Suites. The third wing has been constructed exclusively for the Residences, offering the luxury accommodation. Spread over an area of 615 sq ft, the Towers rooms have an exclusive entrance and are spread across the first floor all the way up to the seventh floor. The Executive Club rooms, with an area of 405 sq ft, are spread across the second floor all the way up to the tenth floor of the first wing. The hotel has a total of 10 food and beverage locations, including Peshawri, which serves cuisine from the Northwest Frontier, and Royal Vega, a vegetarian restaurant. Others include Madras Pavilion, Cafe Mercara, Nutmeg, Cheroot Lounge, Pan Asian, Modo Mio, The Pub, Tranquebar, and Ottimo-Cucina Italiana. Leisure facilities include a 23,000-sq-ft Kaya Kalp Spa with 12 treatment rooms, 2 hamams, a yoga studio, a tea lounge, a men's salon and a salon for women; outdoor pools (with one exclusively for families); gyms for each of the three wings; and a shopping area. There are three swimming pools in the hotel—the rooftop pool with twin smaller pools, a children's pool, and a Jacuzzi, all situated above the banquet hall. The WelcomArt Gallery at the hotel showcases curated selection of art pieces that reflect the Chola-theme of the hotel. RFID columns are installed in the floors to enable the staffs greet the guests by names and offer them a personalised service. The hotel also uses iPad-controlled technology.

Commercial facilities in the hotel include restaurants, a health spa, 30,000-sq-ft banquet space to accommodate up to 600 guests, an exhibition space, a 2,625-sq-ft auditorium named Kalai with a seating capacity of 45, and discreet levels that consist of board room and four meeting rooms, a private multiplex with a capacity of 100 guests and underground parking for 1,000 cars. The hotel has obtained a Platinum rating (the highest on the scale) from Leadership in Energy and Environmental Design (LEED), an internationally recognised green building certification system. The hotel is currently the world's largest LEED-certified green hotel. The hotel has a total workforce close to 4,000 people with over 1,000 people engaging in day-to-day operations. Initially, the hotel also planned to construct a helipad on the terrace, for which the multi-storey building panel of CMDA has denied permission in October 2011.

== Awards and ratings ==
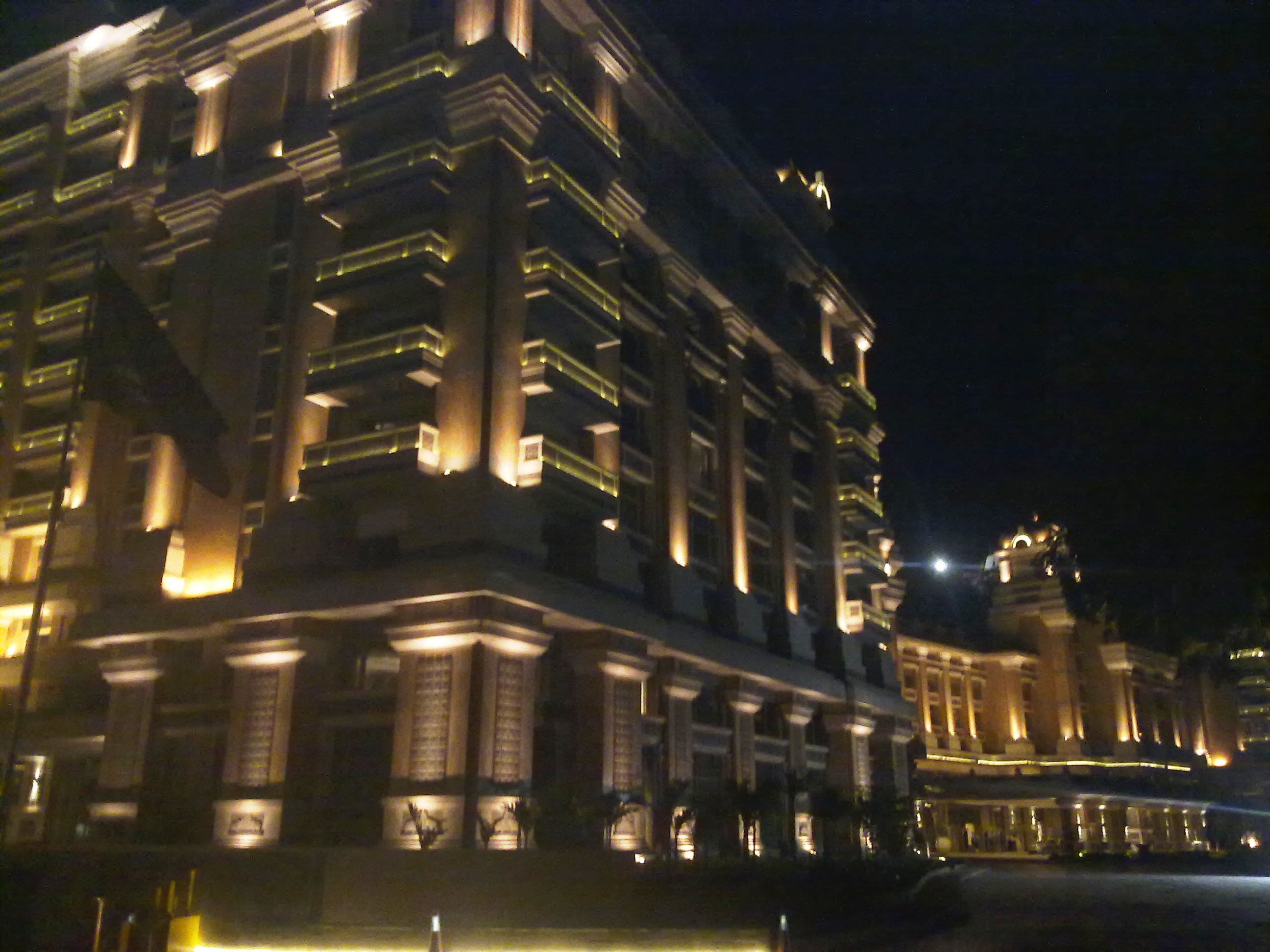
ITC Grand Chola at night

In February 2013, the hotel obtained a 5-star GRIHA rating—the highest national rating for green buildings, conceived by The Energy Research Institute (TERI) and the Union Ministry of New and Renewable Energy (MNRE)—which was presented by President Pranab Mukherjee. The hotel is the first in the country to obtain a 5-star rating from the Association for Development and Research of Sustainable Habitats (ADaRSH). It was rated on 34 criteria, categorised under various sections, including site selection and planning, conservation, utilisation of resources, and building operation and maintenance. The hotel has won Times Food Guide awards for two of its restaurants: Peshawri (for Best North Indian restaurant) and Ottimo-Cucina Italiana (for Best Italian restaurant). It has also been awarded with the title of Greenest Washrooms by Washrooms and Beyond magazine. In June 2014, the hotel was awarded the "Best Business Hotel" award at the third Annual Lonely Planet Magazine Travel Awards 2014.

== Gallery ==
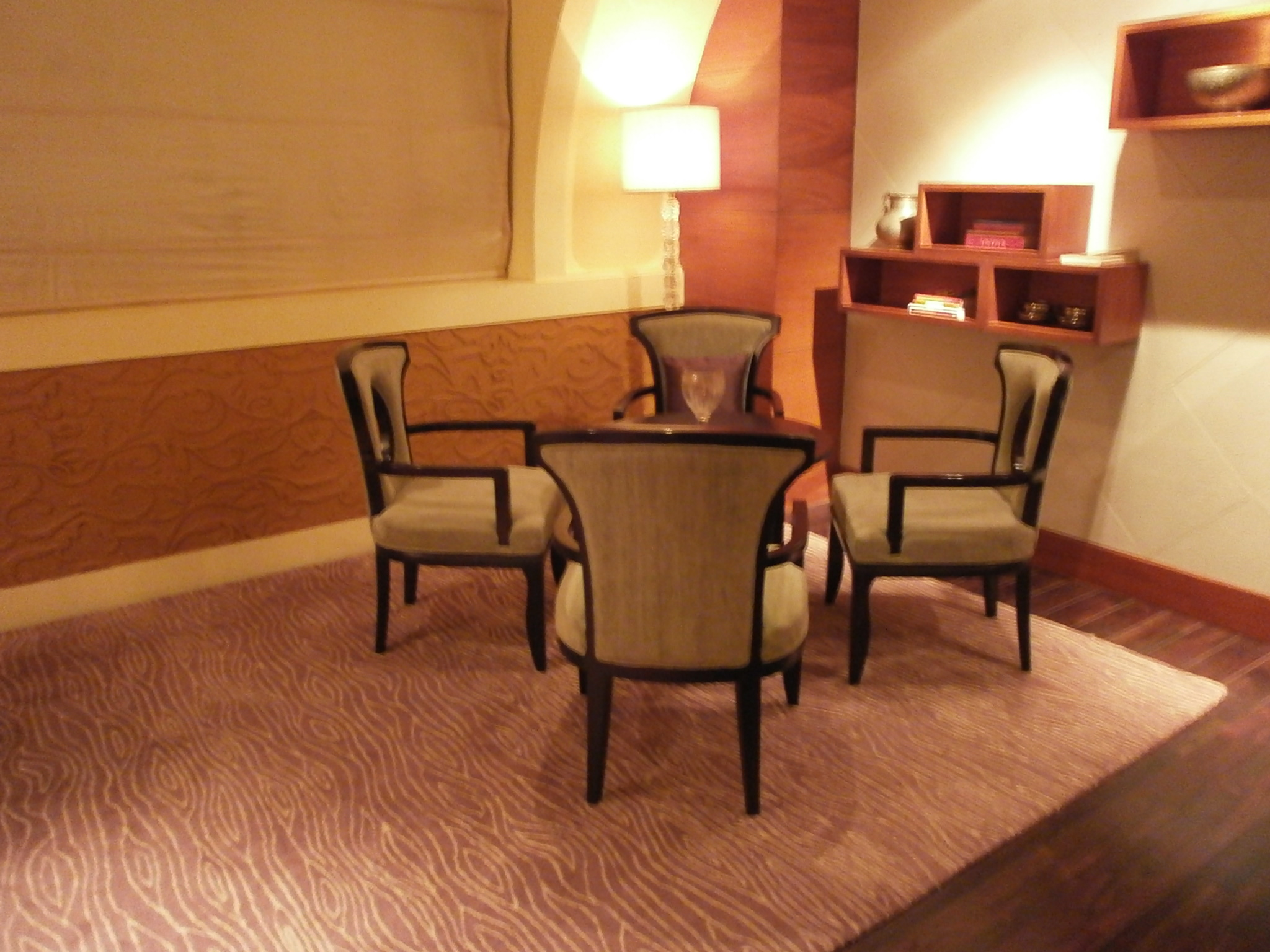
A guestroom in ITC Grand Chola

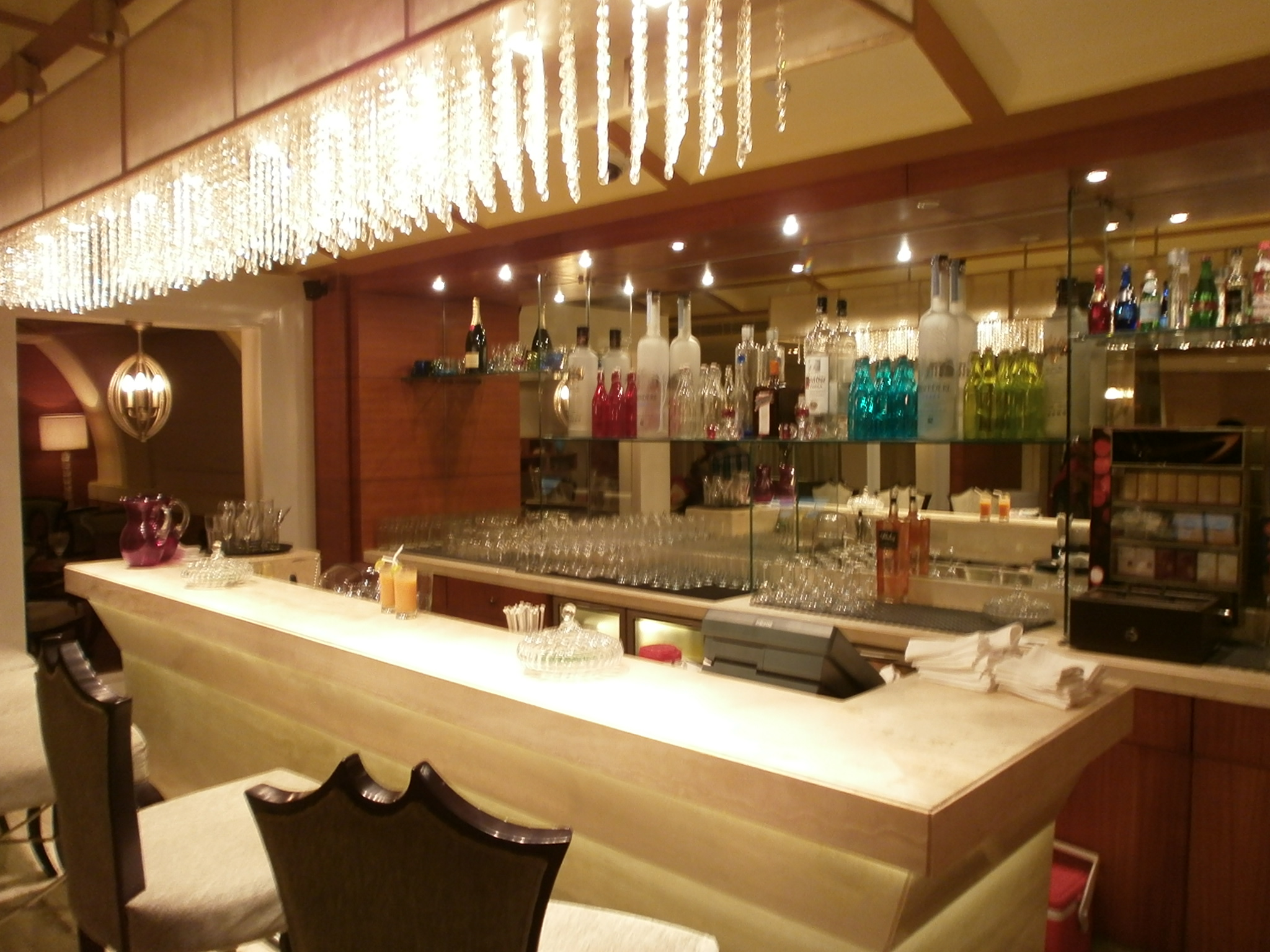
Bar at hotel

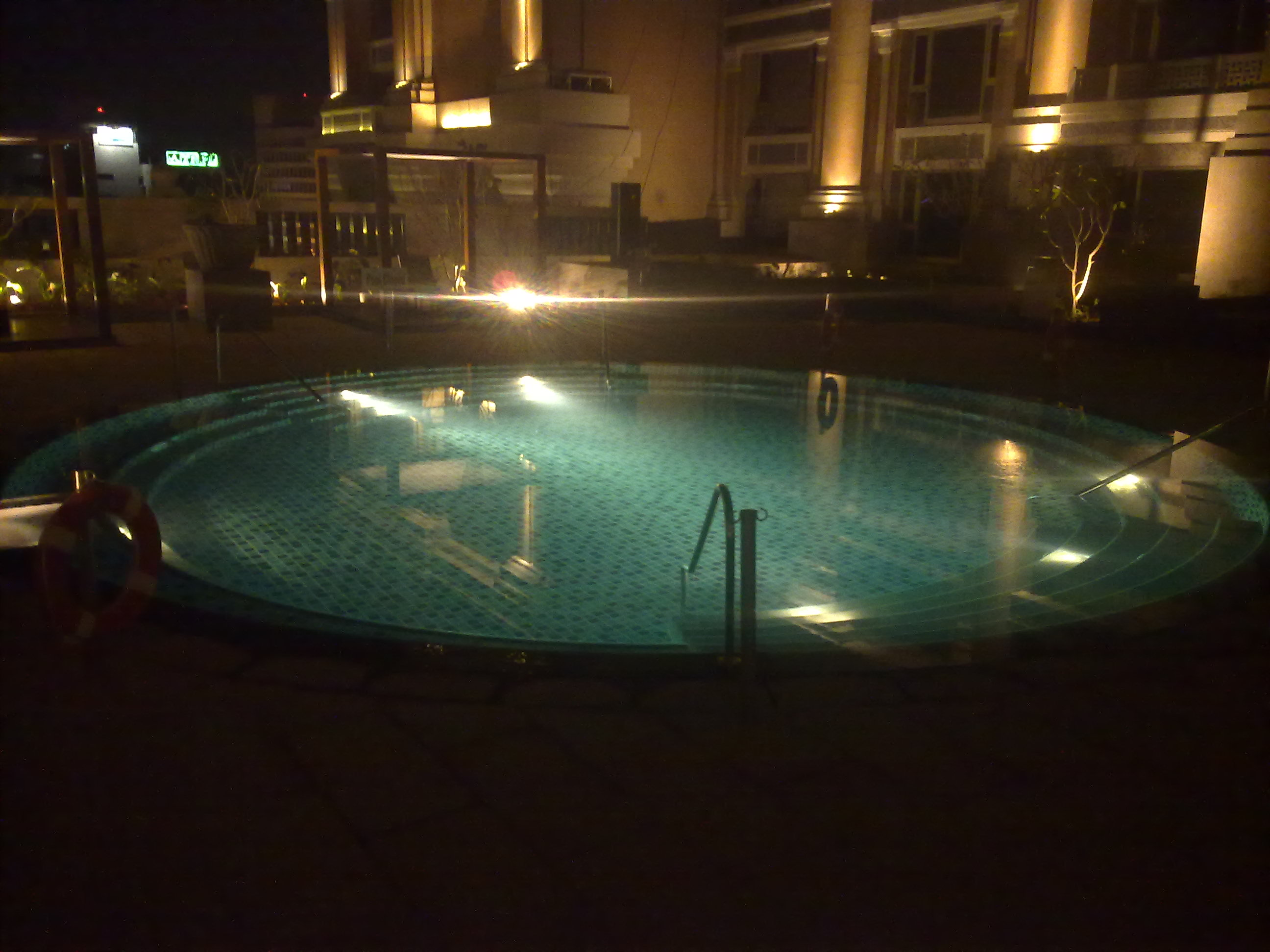
A small swimming pool in enclave of hotel

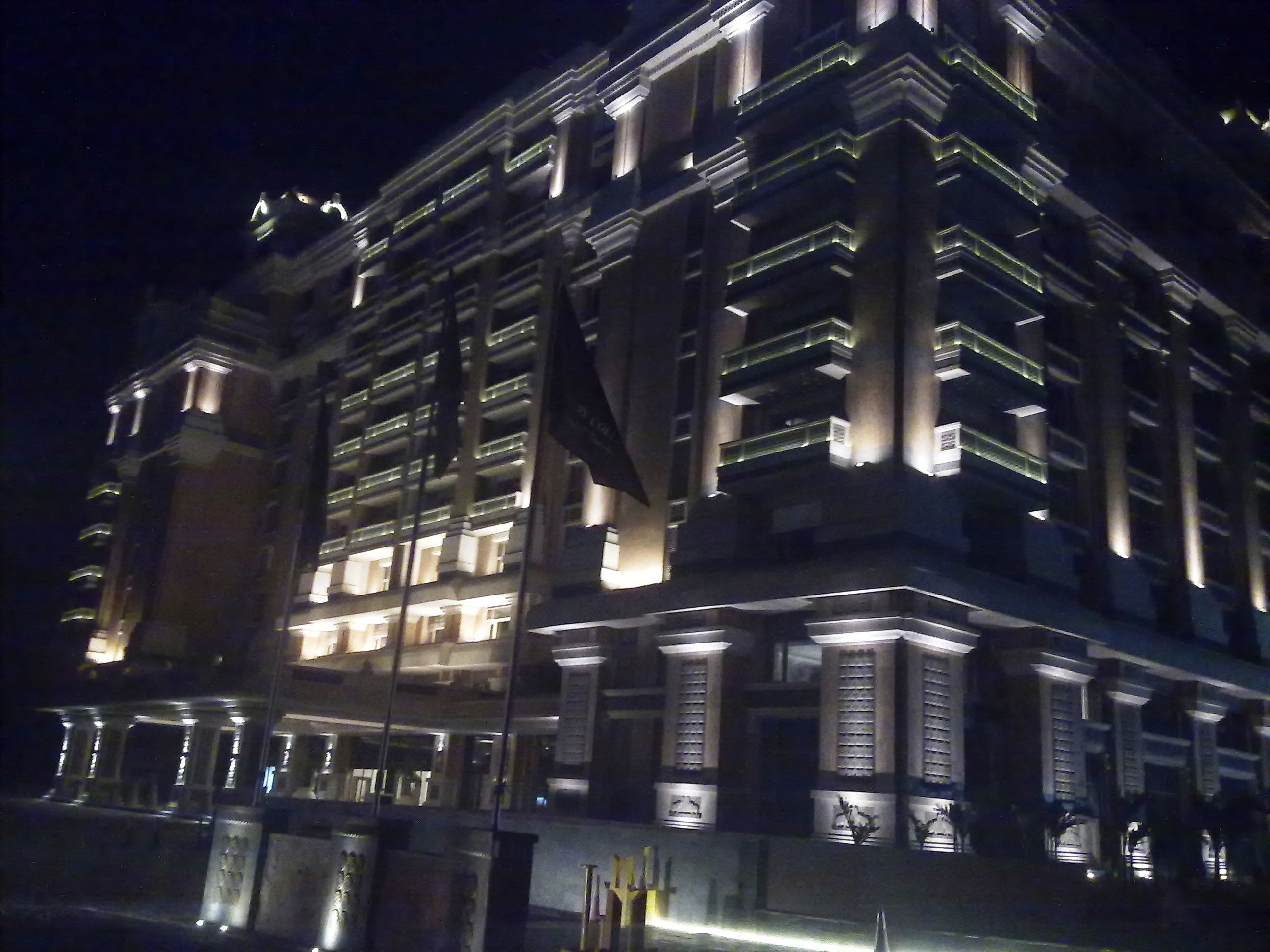
ITC Hotel at night

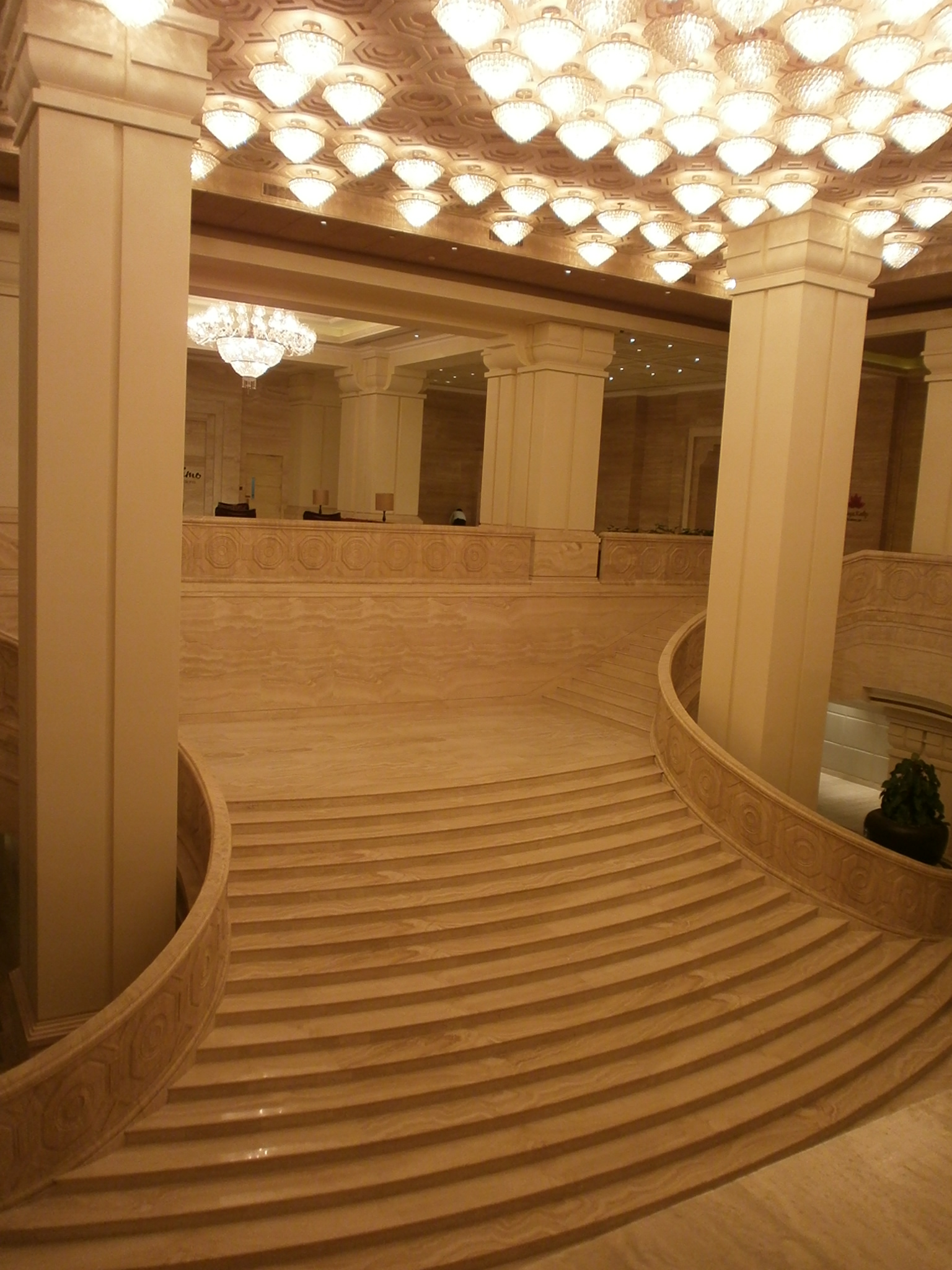
The marbled interiors of the hotel

== See also ==
- Hotels in Chennai
- List of tallest buildings in Chennai
