= Elphinstone Theatre (Madras) =

Elphinstone Theatre, Madras
- New Elphinstone Theatre, seen from the left with an arched entrance

- New Elphinstone Theatre (Madras)
- 13.0692°N 80.2692°E
- Location: Madras Mount Road

The Elphinstone Theatre (Madras), also known as the New Elphinstone Theatre, was a prominent Theatre and cinema hall in Madras, during the early to mid 20th century. Owned and run by J. F. Madan and his franchise of cinemas.It was originally located in the intersection of Wallajah road and Mount road where it operated from 1914 to 1916. After which, it relocated across the roundtana, opposite to Wallajah road and on Mount road, establishing its popularly known location and renaming itself the New Elphinstone Theatre. It was considered the most upscale cinema hall through the 1920s to 1960s in Madras, and the premier destination for Hollywood films. The cinema hall declined in popularity through the 1970s, and closed and later demolished. The present day Raheja complex on Mount road stands in its place.

== History ==
==== Early 20th century & founding ====
The origins of the theatre, begin in 1907. A venue by the name of Cohen's lyrics opened in the same year on the first floor of the Misquith & Co. building on the intersection of Mount road and Wallajah road. Around 1913, the theatre began screening silent films under the name Empire Cinema, to compete with nearby theatres such as Warwick Major's Electric Theatre. In 1914, a devastating fire burnt Empire Cinema, and it was shortly shut down. In the same year, Jamshedji Framji Madan, a Parsi film magnate from Bombay, released and refurbished the venue, and reopened it as Elphinstone theatre in 1914-1915. It was considered Madras's largest permanent cinema theatre at the time, and the first cinema hall with a balcony in the city. It initially screened, early Bioscopes and silent films such as; The Delhi Durbar 1911 (film), Raja Harishchandra, Traffic in souls, suspense, and Fantômas.

Although Madras had a Governor by the name of Elphinstone, the theatre was not named after him, but rather the name Elphinstone, was given by J.F Madan, which was commonly used by all of his Theatres, and was named after the Elphinstone College in Bombay. It was in this college, where Madan worked as a prop boy during the 1860's for the Elphinstone Dramatic Club, from which he built the name for the Elphinstone theatre franchise, which he later headquartered from Calcutta.

==== New Elphinstone Theatre ====
New Elphinstone Theatre, entrance as pictured from the front.

In 1916, Madan acquired a plot of land, opposite to Wallajah road, across the rountuna and the location of the Old Elphinstone Theatre in the Misquith building. He built a fully purposed show piece, The New Elphinstone Theatre. Lord Pentland, then Governor of Madras, inaugurated the Theatre in 1916. It quickly became hugely popular with the theatre watching crowd in the city.

The New Elphinstone theatre, was one of the first in British India, to donate the proceeds of the tickets to World War I efforts. The Cinema hall reached prestige post WWI, after which it became an upscale theatre, for the city's posh and privileged. Throughout the 1920s to the 1960s it was the premier place to go to see films. It started with silent films then screened sound films and later color. Screening several films in languages of English, Tamil, Telugu, Malayalam, Kannada, French, Italian, German and Hindi. Such as; The Ten Commandments, Keechaka Vadham, Metropolis, The General, The Passion of Joan of Arc, The Prince and the Showgirl, Gentlemen prefer blondes, James Bond films.

==== Jaffar's Ice cream & soda parlour ====
The New Elphinstone theatre, consisted of inside an in-house Boxing ring where matches were held, especially popular during the 1930s and 1940s. Including, a soda fountain which served ice cream, soda and beverages. This Soda shop in 1910, was originally called 'Barney Dorai’s Soda Fountain', and was located in the site before the New Elphinstone was built, in a building that housed a Vaudeville and a dance hall called the Lycaeum.

When the New Elphinstone opened in 1916, the soda fountain reopened as The Elphinstone Soda Fountain. During the peak of it's popularity in the 1930s, M. Jaffar, a man who worked as a fountain keeper under Barney Dorai, took over the business when Barney left India for England during the Independence of 1938-1947. Renaming it, Jaffar's Ice cream Parlor. The parlour became hugely popular during the mid-century and remained well known for it's flavours such as "Peach Melba", "Tutti-Frutti" and "Falooda". Just like the theatre, Jaffar's also lost popularity at the end of the 1970's and shut down in 1979. The Ice cream parlour opened several branches such as in, other parts of Mount road, Wallers Road, Royapettah, Fountain Plaza and Triplicane High road. The company is still in operation, however it is no longer a ice cream confectionary, but goes by the name of M. Jafar & Co. and is a commercial supplier of block, crushed and edible ice, in Mirsahibpet, Royapettah.

==== Changing times, closure & demolition ====
The demographic of Madras, changed largely post the British Raj, and was influenced by the influx of Pan-Indian films and shows as well as development in cinematography. This caused several theatres to open up in Madras, Shanti (1961), Safire (1964) and Devi Pilot and Paradise (1970). Slowly the audience began shifting to newer, modern and air-conditioned theatres with popular amenities. New Elphinstone struggled to stay working, with its non-AC halls and older retrofitting's, the cinema hall slowed down film production and screening, and later operated primarily as The Elphinstone soda Fountain. This too, shut down in the end of the 1970s, and by 1979, New Elphinstone theatre was sold, and demolished. In its place in 1981, the multi-story Raheja complex was constructed primarily as a commercial space.

== Present day & Legacy ==
Today, the New Elphinstone theatre is no longer standing in Madras, and the number of theatres have been in decline in the city following the beginning of the 2010s. On the current location of the building on Mount road stands Raheja complex, opposite from the Goverment estate, Wallajah road, and by the Wallajah road subway.
