= Maraimalai Adigal Bridge =

Bridge in Tamil Nadu, India

The Maraimalai Adigal Bridge (previously the Marmalong Bridge) is a road bridge on Anna Salai connecting the northern and southern banks of the Adyar River.

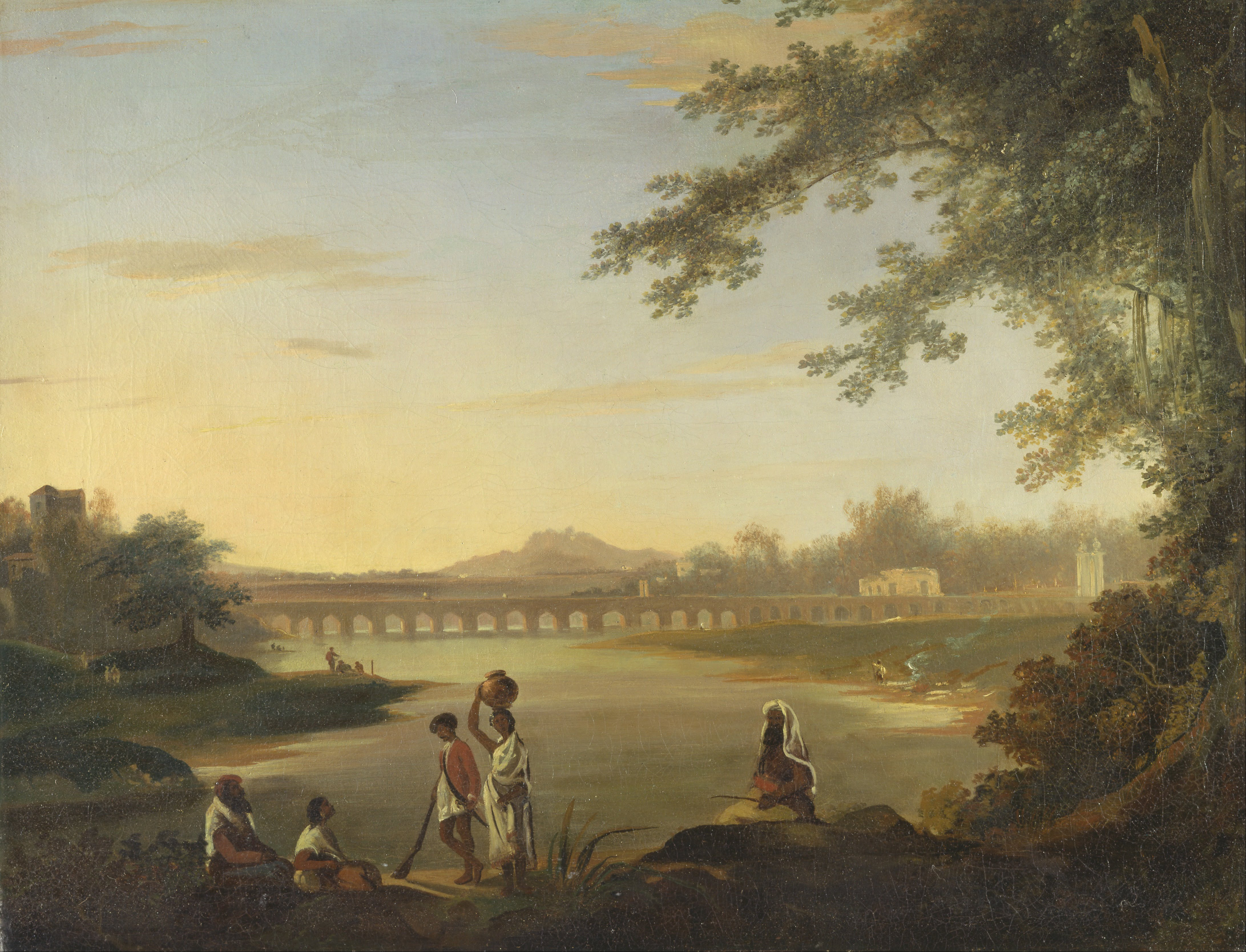
The Marmalong Bridge, with a Sepoy and Natives in the Foreground, 1783, William Hodges, Yale Center for British Art

== History ==
The oldest bridge across the Adyar River - the Marmalong Bridge - was originally constructed by the Armenian merchant Coja Petrus Uscan in 1728 at the cost of Rs. one lakh. He left a trilingual inscription in Armenian, Latin, and Persian. The bridge was named after the nearby village of Mambalam which was Anglicized to Marmalan or Marmalong. The dilapidated old bridge was replaced by a new one in 1966. The new bridge is named after Maraimalai Adigal, a Tamil writer and proponent of the Pure Tamil movement.

Uscan's construction of the bridge is commemorated by a plaque at the northern end of the bridge adjoining the Saidapet bus stand.

== Other sources ==
- Muthiah, S. (2004). Madras Rediscovered. East West Books (Madras) Pvt Ltd. ISBN 81-88661-24-4.
