= Raheja Towers, Chennai =

Raheja Towers
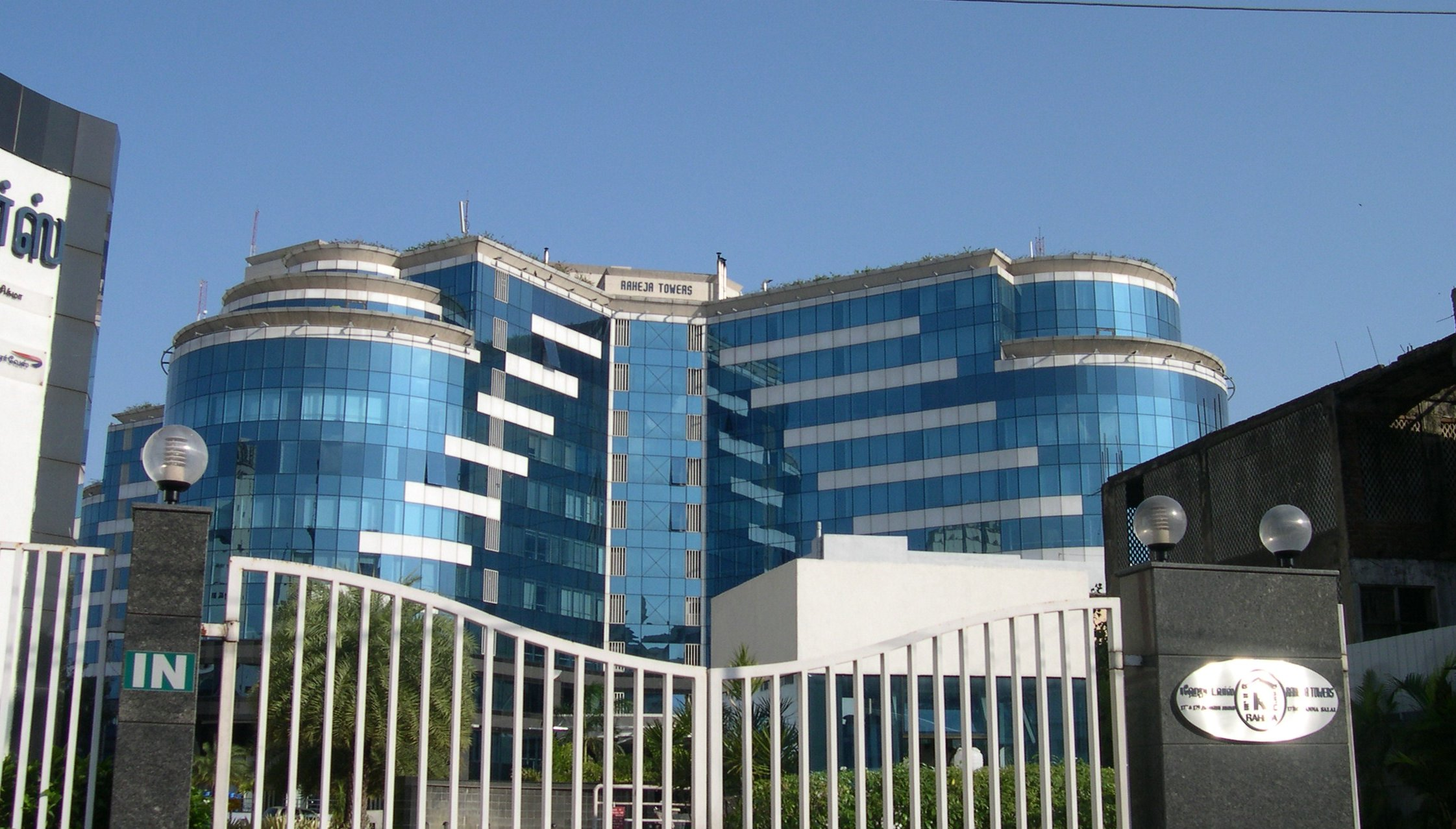
- Raheja Towers in Anna Salai

General information
- Type: Commercial offices
- Architectural style: Modernism
- Location: Anna Salai, Chennai, India, 177, Anna Salai, Chennai, Tamil Nadu 600 002, India
- Coordinates: 13°3′45″N 80°15′55″E
- Completed: 2001
- Owner: K. Raheja Group and Union Motors
- Operator: CB Richard Ellis

Height
- Roof: 43.73 m (143.5 ft)

Technical details
- Floor count: 11
- Floor area: 399,000 sq ft (37,000 m^{2})

Raheja Towers is an 11-storied building in Chennai, India. Located on the arterial Anna Salai, the building has a total built-up area of 399,000 sq ft. It is one of the earliest Grade A commercial projects of the city, which were developed in the second half of the 1990s.

== History ==
The project, a commercial property, is a joint venture between the Union Motors Ltd and the K. Raheja group. The land on which the building has been built belongs to Union Motors.

== Design and structure ==
The building is built on a land measuring 60 grounds. The building has 11 floors, reaching an overall height of 43.73 m. Total floor area of the building is about 399,000 sq ft, with a floor plate area of around 38,000 sq ft.

The building has an optical fibre exchange provided by BSNL capable of catering to about 2,500 optical fibre lines.

In March 2002, the World Bank inaugurated its back office centre spread over 26,000 sq ft in the building, with about 180 staff. Later it moved to its own building in Taramani. Raheja Towers also houses companies like Cisco Systems and Sony Corporation.

In 2010, the Regional Passport Office at Shastri Bhavan on Haddows Road at Nungambakkam was shifted to its own premises in Raheja towers, which was later shifted to Rayala Towers situated opposite Raheja towers.

== See also ==
- List of tallest buildings in Chennai
- Architecture of Chennai
