= Thousand Lights Mosque =

Mosque in Chennai, Tamil Nadu, India

- ஆயிரம்விளக்கு மசூதி
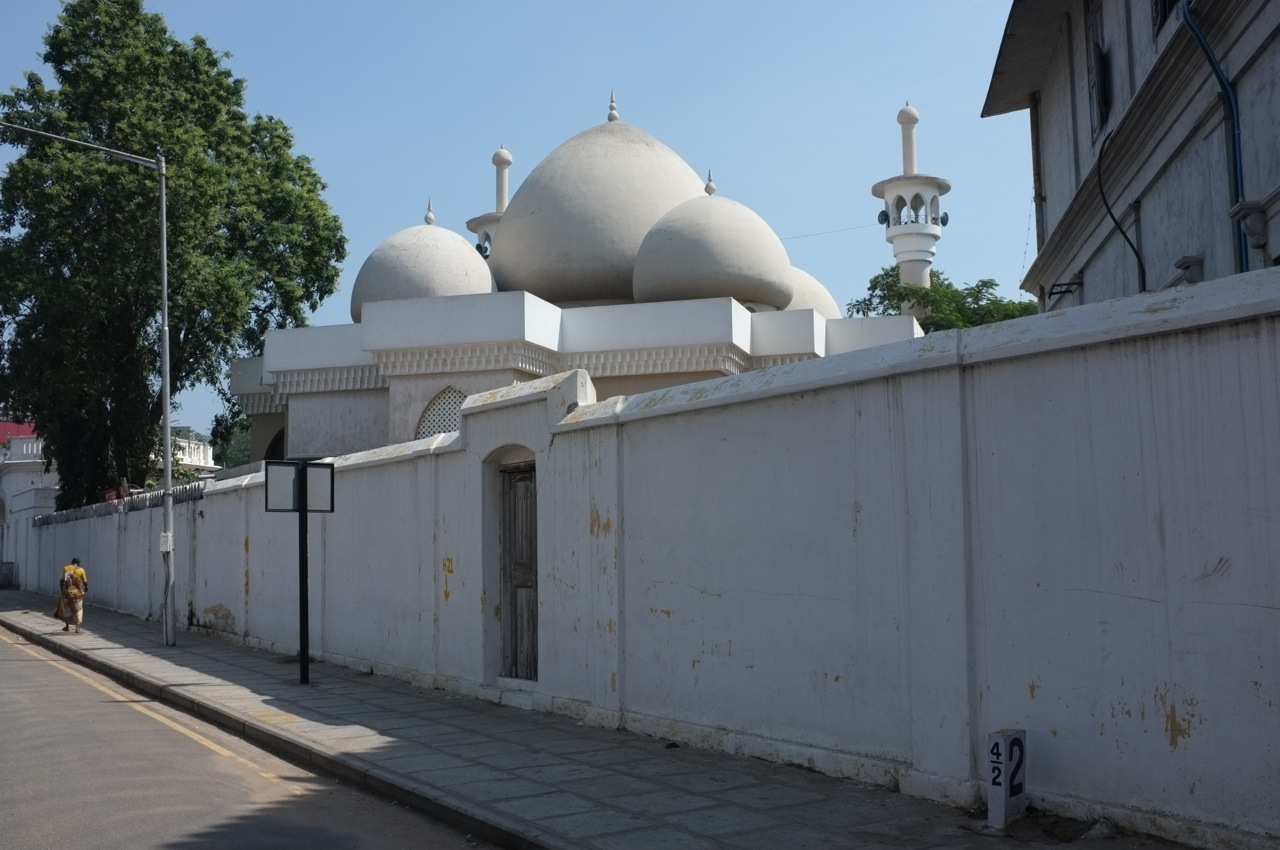
- The mosque and its domes, in 2011

- The mosque located in Chennai

Religion
- Affiliation: Shia Islam
- Ecclesiastical or organizational status: Mosque
- Status: Active

Location
- Location: Chennai, Tamil Nadu
- Country: India
- Interactive map of Thousand Lights Mosque
- Coordinates: 13°3′18″N 80°15′18″E

Architecture
- Architect: Nawab Umdat ul-Umara
- Type: Mosque architecture
- Style: Indo-Islamic
- Completed: 1810

Specifications
- Capacity: 1,000 worshippers
- Dome: Five
- Minaret: Two
- Inscriptions: Many

Website
- princeofarcot.org

The Thousand Lights Mosque (Tamil: ஆயிரம்விளக்கு மசூதி) is a Shi'ite mosque in Anna Salai in Chennai, in the state of Tamil Nadu, India. It is one of the largest mosques in the country and is a revered place of worship and azadari for Shia Muslims.

== History ==
The mosque was built in 1810 by Arcot Nawab Umdat ul-Umara. It was constructed in medieval architecture. The site of the mosque was previously occupied by an assembly hall. There was a tradition of lighting thousand oil lamps to illuminate the assembly hall. The mosque thus gets its name from this tradition.

The chief Shia Qazi of Chennai functions from the mosque, and the post has been continuously held by the same family.

== See also ==
- Islam in India
- List of mosques in India
