= Victoria Technical Institute =

Inauguration of the institute in 1905

Victoria Technical Institute is an institute established to commemorate the Golden Jubilee of Queen Victoria. The institute promotes traditional handicrafts of South India.

== History ==
The Victoria Technical Institute was opened in Pantheon Road, Egmore, Madras in the year 1889 in commemoration of the golden jubilee celebrations of Queen Victoria. The foundation stone of the building was laid by the then Prince of Wales in 1905. The pink sandstone Indo-Saracenic construction resembled the Mughal Emperor Akbar's palace in Fatehpur Sikri.

The Victoria Technical Institute was moved to Mount Road in 1956 and presently occupies a building next to the head office of the Indian Overseas Bank.
