= Jamshedji Framji Madan =

Indian film magnate (1857–1923)

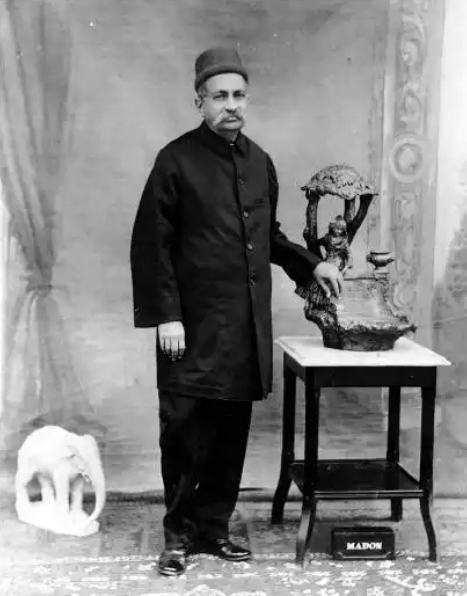
- Born: 27 April 1857; Bombay, British India
- Died: 28 June 1923 (aged 66–67); Calcutta, British India

Jamshedji Framji CBE (27 April 1857, Bombay – 28 June 1923), professionally known as J. F. & Madan, was an Indian theatre and film magnate who was one of the pioneers of film production in India, and an early exhibitor, distributor and producer of films and plays. He accumulated his wealth on the Parsi theatre district scene in Bombay in the 1890s where he owned two theatre companies. He moved to Calcutta in 1902 where he founded Elphinstone Bioscope Company, and began producing and exhibiting silent movies including Jyotish Sarkar's Bengal Partition Movement in 1905. He expanded his empire considerably after acquiring rights to Pathé Frères films. He produced Satyavadi Raja Harishchandra in 1917 and Bilwamangal in 1919. Satyavadi Raja Harishchandra was the first feature film to be shot in Calcutta. Elphinstone merged into Madan Theatres Limited in 1919 which adapted many of Bengali's most popular literary works to the stage. Madan Theatres was a major force in Indian theatre throughout the 1920s and 1930s.

== Early life ==
He was born into a Parsi family in Bombay. Madan's father suffered a huge monetary loss when Bombay Reclamation Bank, which was responsible for reclaiming land between the seven islands of Bombay, failed. JF Madan had to leave school, and he joined Elphinstone Dramatic Club as a prop boy in 1868. By 1875, this amateur club turned into a professional theatre company staging shows all over India.

== Entrepreneur ==
In 1882, Madan left the theatre company and had a short successful stint in business at Karachi. He moved to Calcutta in 1883. His success in a business of supplying goods to army cantonments enabled him to buy Corinthian Hall, where theatre shows used to be staged. Also, he took over the Elphinstone Theatre Company, where he started his career, from Cooverji Nazir, one of the founders of the theatre. Corinthian Hall was turned into Corinthian Theatre, and it became very popular for Parsi theatre shows, which were full of grandeur and had women actors, a rarity in those days.

In 1902, he started bioscope shows in a tent in Maidan, Calcutta along with similar shows in Corinthian Theatre. The equipments used were procured from Pathé Frères of Paris. Most of the films shown in those shows were from Pathé Productions. These bioscope shows were organised under the banner of Elphinstone Bioscope Company. Elphinstone Bioscope Company produced a number of short films. He also started film shows in Alfred Theatre, which he bought in the same year.

In 1907, he established Elphinstone Picture Palace (currently known as Chaplin Cinema), which was the first permanent show house in Calcutta. He also opened Madan Theatre and Palace of Varieties (now known as Elite Cinema). In 1914, he opened Elphinstone Theatre in Madras, later reopening it as New Elphinstone Theatre in 1916.

During the First World War, he helped as a supplier to Supply and Transport Corps in the British Indian Army in Lucknow. He was appointed an Officer of the Order of the British Empire in the 1918 Birthday Honours for his support, and was invested as a Commander of the Order in 1923.

After the war, his business started growing rapidly. In 1919, his film production business became a joint stock company with the name of Madan Theatres Limited. Madan Theatres and its associates had great control over theatre houses in India during that period. In 1919, Madan produced the first Bengali feature film, Bilwamangal. It was first screened in the Cornwallis Theatre (now known as the Sree Cinema).

The Electric Theatre (now known as Regal Cinema), Grand Opera House (currently known as Globe Cinema) and Crown Cinema (now known as Uttara Cinema) were all owned by Madan Theatres.

== Legacy ==
Madan and his relatives were involved in a variety of businesses including liquor imports, food, pharmaceutical products, real estate, insurance, etc. But among all these, Madan Theatre was the most well-known and most well-established. It spread over Burma and Ceylon, which were part of British India.

J. J. Madan, third son of J. F. Madan, became managing director of Madan Theatres after the latter's death in 1923. Madan Theatres reached a peak in the late 1920s when it owned 127 theatres and controlled half of the country's box office. Madan Theatres produced a number of popular and landmark films until 1937.

Indian-American actor Erick Avari is a great-great-grandson of J. F. Madan (and great-grandson of J. J. Madan).

Cyrus J. Madan is also the great-great grandson of J.F. Madan. He lives in Kolkata (India) with his wife Trista Madan. They have three children Jamshed, Shara and Tashya. Cyrus is a reputed figure in the Indian Horse Racing and theatre circles.
