= Anna Salai =

Arterial road in Chennai, India

- Mount Road
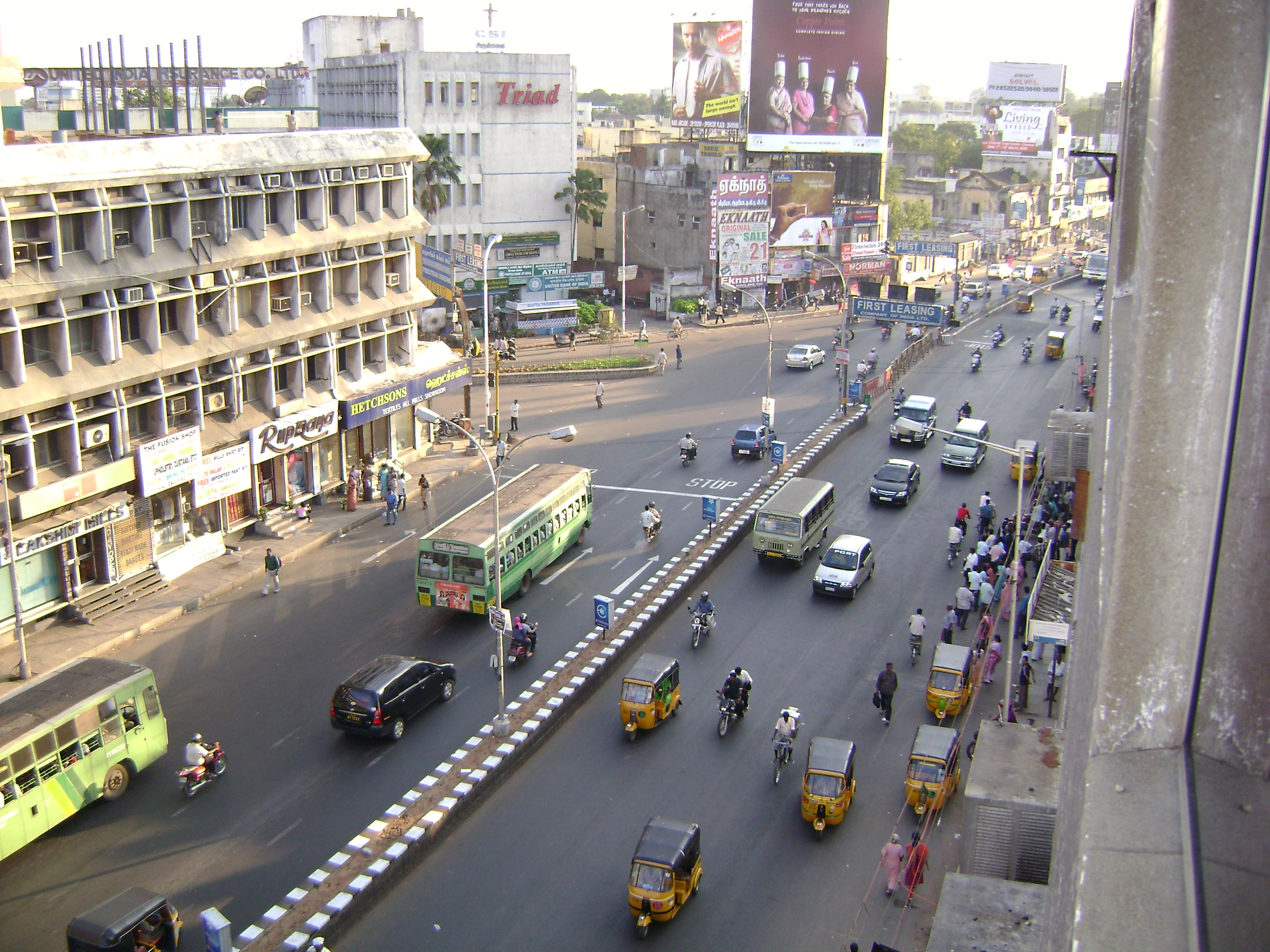

Route information
- Maintained by Tamil Nadu State Highways Department, Greater Chennai Corporation, National Highways Authority of India
- Length: 8 mi (13 km)

Major junctions
- North end: Flag Staff Road, Island Grounds, Chennai
- Pallavan Salai; Swami Sivananda Salai; Wallajah Road; General Patters Road; Binny Road / Spencers Plaza; Whites Road; Greams Road; Peters Road; Avvai Shanmugam Salai (Lloyds Road); Utthamar Gandhi Salai (Nungambakkam High Road); Dr. Radhakrishnan Salai (Cathedral Road); Gopathy Narayana Chetty Road; Sir Thyagaraya Road; Kavignar Bharathidasan Road; Cenotaph Road; Venkatanarayana Road; Pasumpon Muthuramalinga Thevar Road (Chamiers Road); South Usman Road; Taluk Office Road (Little Mount Jn); Sardar Patel Road; Race Course Road; Muthu Kumaraswami Naicker Road (Maduvankarai)
- South end: GST Road / Inner Ring Road, Mount-Poonamallee Road, Kathipara Junction at St.Thomas Mount, Chennai

Location
- Country: India
- State: Tamil Nadu

Highway system
- Roads in India; Expressways; National; State; Asian; State Highways in Tamil Nadu

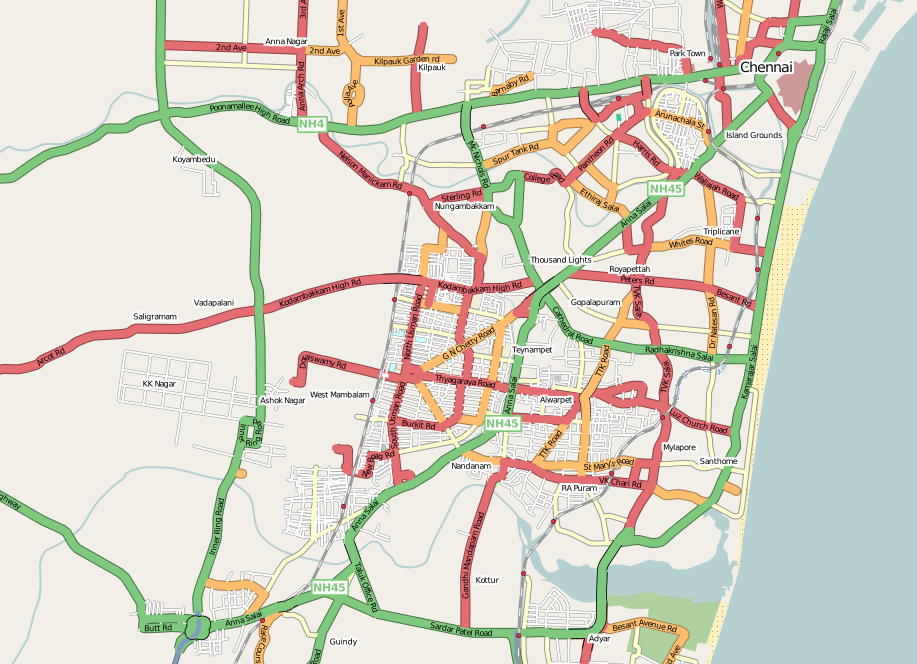
Map of Chennai showing Anna Salai

Anna Salai (Tamil: [aɳɳaː saːlaɪ]), named after C. N. Annadurai, formerly known as the St. Thomas Mount Road or simply Mount Road, is an arterial road in Chennai, India. It starts at the Cooum Creek, south of Fort St George, leading in a south-westerly direction towards St. Thomas Mount, and ends at the Kathipara Junction in Guindy. Beyond the Kathipara Junction, a branch road arises traversing westwards to Poonamallee to form the Mount-Poonamallee Road while the main branch continuing southwards to Chennai Airport, Tambaram and beyond to form Grand Southern Trunk Road (GST Road or NH45).

Anna Salai, which is more than 300 years old, is acknowledged as the most important road in Chennai city. The stretch is dotted with famous landmarks, statues, office buildings, hotels and commercial enterprises, many of which are heritage structures. It is the second longest road in Chennai, after EVR Periyar Salai.

Several flyover projects were under consideration on the road, many of which have been shelved owing to the construction of the Chennai Metro project, which runs along the median of the road. Anna Salai Head Post office, one of the most important post offices in the city, is located on this road. It was established in 1854 as Mount Road SO as a non-gazetted delivery office. With the growth of commerce and urbanisation, this SO was upgraded to gazetted in 1955. Nomenclature of this Head Post office was changed from Mount Road Head Post office to Anna Road Head Post office on 15 September 1974.

== History ==
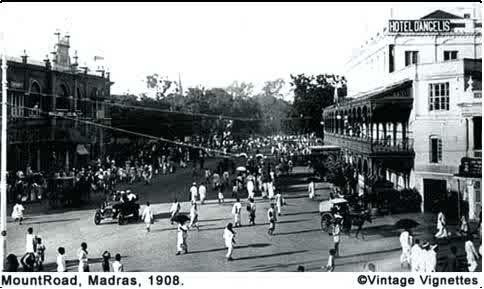
Mount Road in 1900

Anna Salai had its origins in a cart track which was used by the European employees of the British East India Company to travel from the factory at Fort St George to the town of St Thomas Mount where the apostle St Thomas is believed to have been martyred, according to Christian belief. The road, in its present form, took shape during the time of Charles Macartney who served as Governor of Madras from 1781 to 1785. When the Armenian merchant Coja Petrus Uscan constructed the Marmalong Bridge across the Adyar River in Saidapet in 1726, the road had already been gaining in prominence.

During the 18th and 19th centuries, Company merchants, civil servants and army officers who had grown tired of the noise and congestion of Fort St George purchased plots of land along Mount Road and set up "garden houses". These garden houses, unique to Madras city, were spacious private residences situated deep within their own compounds surrounded by lawns or gardens. Around this time, the land south of the Coovum River acquired the name "Great Choultry Plain", an allusion to the numerous choultries along the road where travellers could break for the day during long journeys.

By this time, the British East India Company were building an empire of their own. Thomas Saunders, Governor of Madras from 1750 to 1755, found the Governor's house in Fort St George inadequate and not befitting the stature of the residence of a Madras governor, and rented a private mansion along Mount Road at Chepauk belonging to a Portuguese widow, Mrs. Madeiros for setting up a "garden house". The house was eventually purchased and renovated in 1801 at a cost of Rs. 3 lakhs by governor Edward Clive who also built the Banqueting Hall nearby at a cost of Rs. 2.50 lakhs to commemorate British victory over Tipu Sultan in the Fourth Anglo-Mysore War.

The Equestrian statue of Thomas Munro erected in 1839 is among the oldest surviving monuments on Anna Salai.

A marble cenotaph was erected at Teynampet to commemorate Lord Cornwallis, Viceroy of India from 1786 to 1793 upon his death in 1805. The cenotaph was designed to support a life-size statue of Lord Cornwallis that had been sculpted in 1800 and housed at the Fort St George. However, the statue was never moved out of Fort St George and a public park - the Hyde Park eventually grew around the Cenotaph which was on the banks of the Long Tank and made up for the statue. Hyde Park and its Cenotaph were frequented by the European population of Madras city and a band played at the park in the evenings. The Cenotaph was the most preferred recreation spot for the residents of Madras city till the creation of Marina Beach in 1884. The Cenotaph was eventually moved out of Teynampet in the early 1900s and the park closed down.

By the early 20th century, Mount Road began emerging as a favourite shopping destination among the city's elite, replacing Popham's Broadway. Shops included bookshops, watch, jewellery and furniture showrooms, departmental stores like Spencer & Co that sold cakes, wines and spirits, ice cream shops like Jaffer's, car showrooms and hotels like the Spencer Hotel, the Connemara or D' Angelis and cinema halls such as Elphinstone Theatre. In the decades following independence, the importance of Mount Road might have dwindled a bit with the emergence of other shopping areas like T. Nagar, but it continued to attract visitors. A large number of heritage structures on Anna Salai were built during this period and many have survived - P. Orr & Sons (1877), the Kardyl Building (1897), Agurchand Mansion, Higginbotham's bookstore (1904), the Gove Building (1916), offices of The Mail (1921) and The Hindu(1939), the Mount Road branch of the Imperial Bank of India (1921), all date from this time.

== The Stretch ==
Anna Salai starts from the Parktown area of Chennai city where Chennai Central railway terminus is situated. It, then, traverses the Island with its statue of Sir Thomas Munro to the other side of the Coovum before entering the neighbourhoods of Thousand Lights and Teynampet areas. From Teynampet, it continues straight southwards to Nandanam and Saidapet before traversing the Maraimalai Adigal Bridge across the Adyar River to Little Mount and finally, Guindy.

Anna Salai is maintained by the Tamil Nadu Highways Department. The road extends for a total of 11 kilometres and traverses the heart of the city.

By the 2010s, the stretch between Parry's Corner and Nandanam was used by over 16,000 vehicles during rush hour. Anna Salai is used by over 0.183 million vehicles every day. The Metropolitan Transport Corporation in Anna Salai carries about 14,000 passengers per hour per direction.

== Safety level ==
Anna Salai remains the road in the city experiencing second most number of accidents annually, next only to Jawaharlal Nehru Road (100 ft Inner Ring Road), with one person being injured every 1.13 days. Together, these roads account for almost 14 per cent of the 5,101 accidents that occurred in Chennai in 2010. New traffic regulations have posed sizeable problems to motorists in recent times which was however introduced to streamline congestion issues.

== Landmarks on Anna Salai ==
=== Major landmarks ===
- Agurchand Mansion (built late 1800s)
- Anna Flyover
- Ashok Leyland - ALCOB Building
- Bharat Overseas Bank Headquarters
- Indian Overseas Bank Headquarters
- Bharat Insurance Building (built 1897)
- Century Plaza
- Christ Church (built 1852)
- Cosmopolitan Club
- Cosmopolitan Club Golf Links
- Pasumpon Thevar Statue
- American Consulate
- Devaneya Paavaanar Library
- Devi Theater
- Dravida Munnetra Kazhagam [DMK] (Party Headquarters)
- Gove House (built 1916)
- The Grand Chola Hotel
- Guindy Railway Overbridge
- Higginbotham's (India's oldest bookshop) (built 1844)
- Hindustan Teleprinters Limited (built early 1900s)
- Hyatt Regency Hotel
- Indian Oil Building
- Intellectual Property India Headquarters
- Island Grounds Exhibition Centre
- Kalignar Satellite Television Headquarters
- Kamaraj Memorial Hall
- Kathipara Cloverleaf Intersection
- Le Royal Meridien Hotel
- LIC Building (Chennai's first skyscraper)
- Madras Gymkhana Club
- Maraimalai Adigal Bridge
- Mount Road Mosque
- Thousand Lights Mosque (built early 1800s)
- Mount Road Head Post Office
- The Hindu
- The Mail (built 1921)
- Thevar Statue
- Oxford University Press
- P Orr & Sons (built 1873)
- Panagal Building
- The Park Hotel
- Poombuhar Building (built late 1800s)
- Rajaji Hall (built 1802)
- Raheja Towers
- Rani Seethai Hall
- Rayala Towers
- Sacred Heart School, Church Park
- Safire Theatre complex (now demolished)
- Saidapet Teachers' College
- Semmozhi Poonga
- Simpsons
- Spencer Plaza
- SPIC Building
- State Bank of India building (built early 1900s)
- St. George's Cathedral (built 1816)
- St. Thomas Mount
- Sterling Towers
- Taj Connemara Hotel
- Tamil Nadu Electricity Board Headquarters
- Tamil Nadu Legislative Assembly Government Estate
- Tamil Nadu Newsprint and Papers Limited (TNPL)
- Tamil Nadu Pollution Control Board
- Tarapore Towers
- The British Council
- VGP Victory House
- Victoria Technical Institute
- Voltas
- Willington Bridge
- YMCA

=== Railway Stations ===
- Chintadripet MRTS railway station
- Guindy railway station
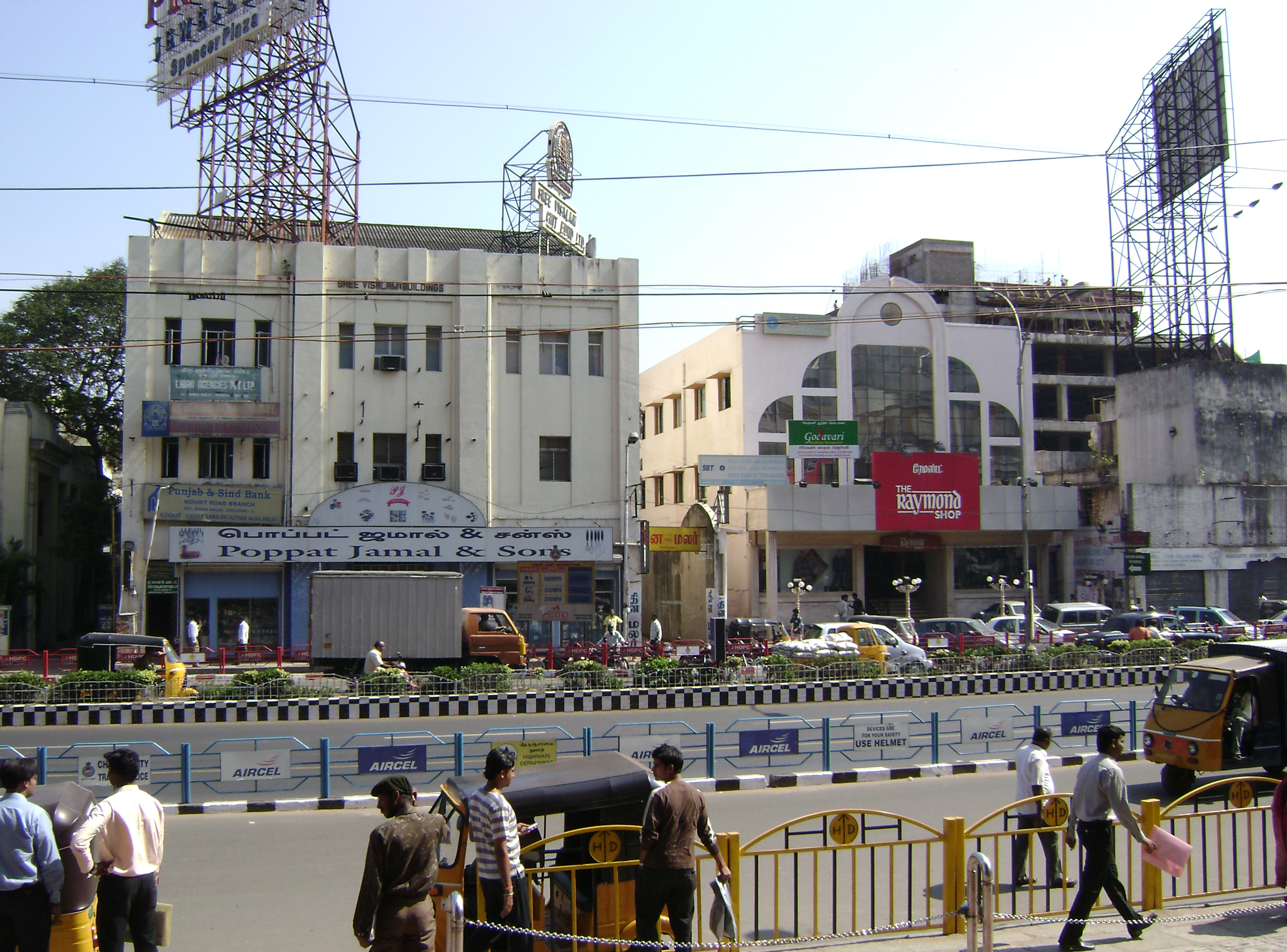
Anna Salai shops

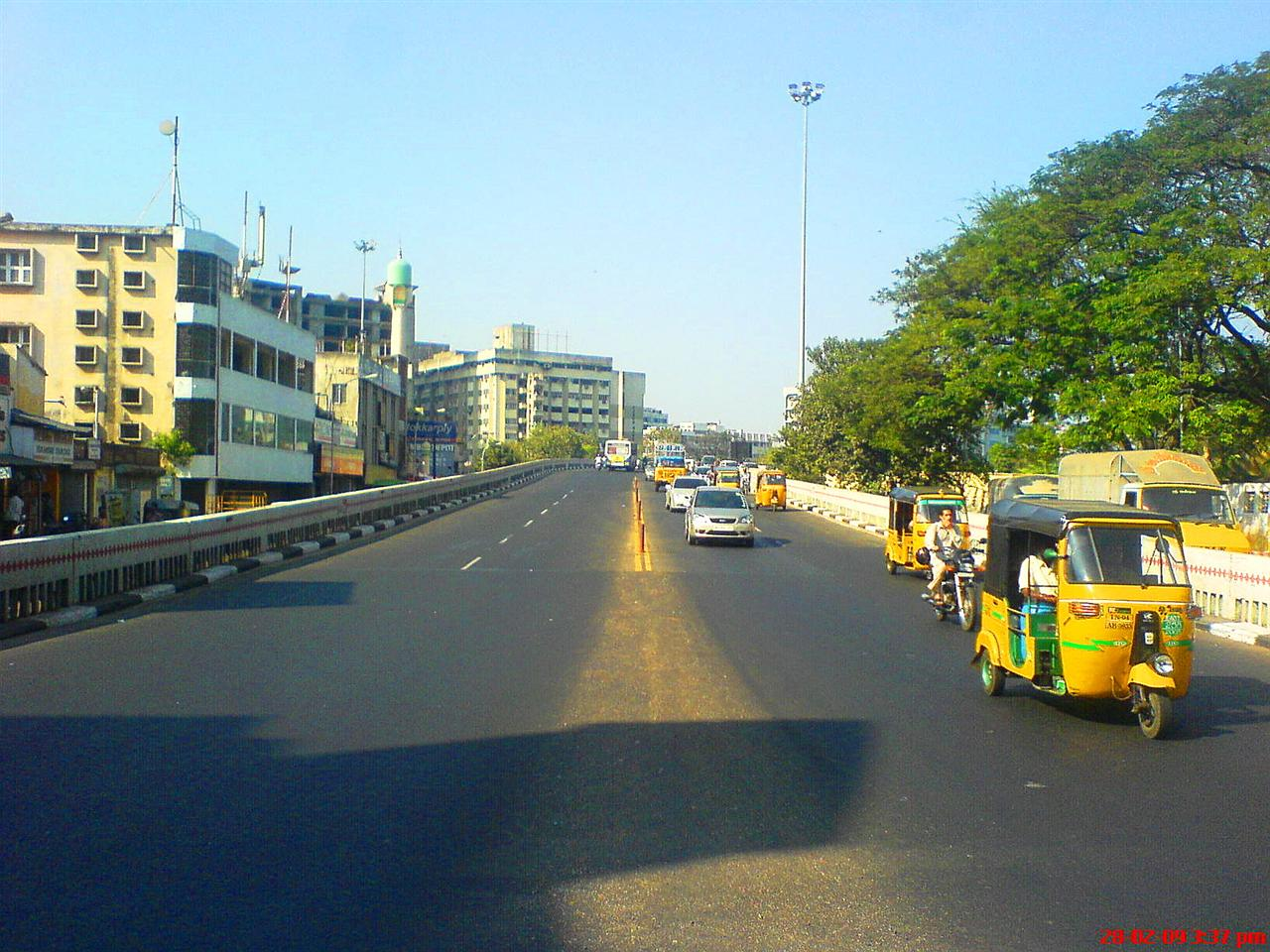
Gemini Flyover-Anna Salai

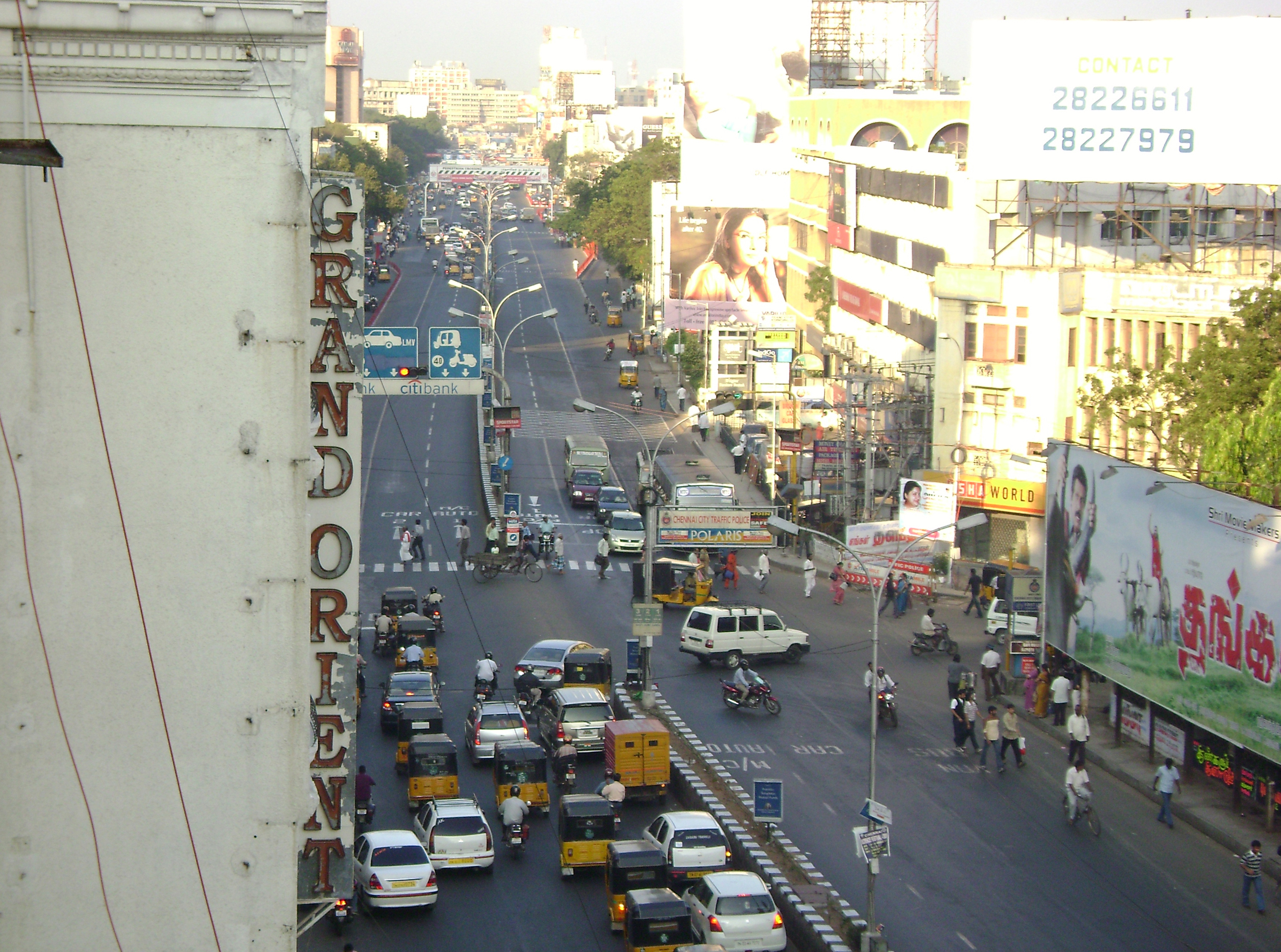
Anna Salai near old Anand Theater

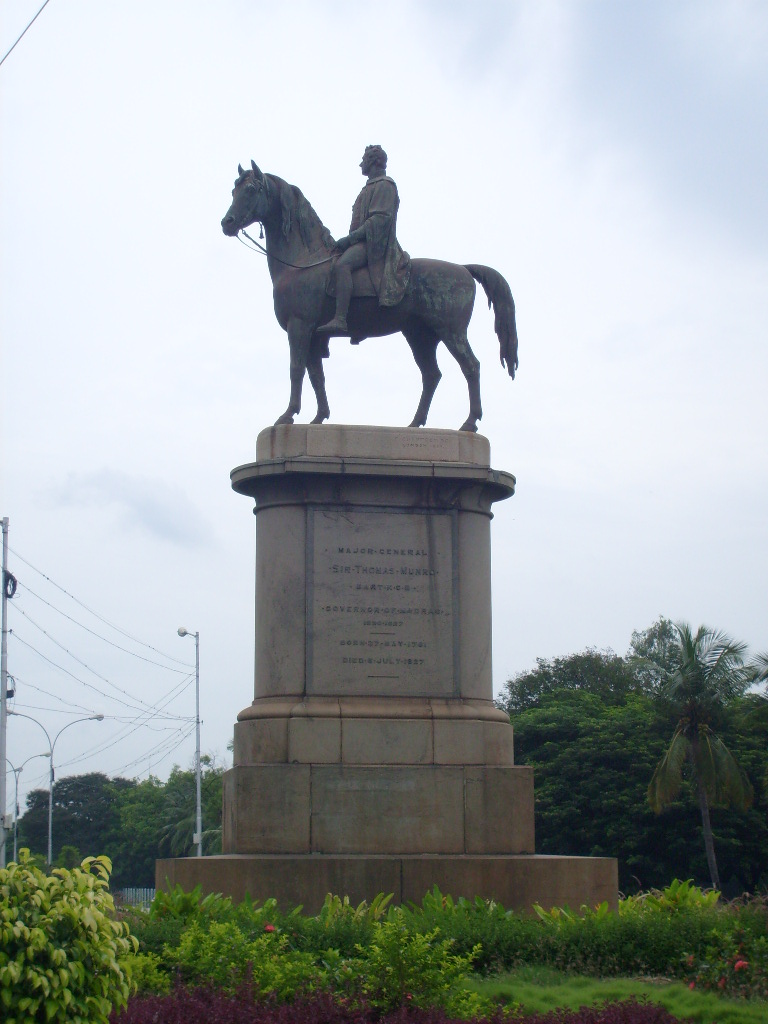
Statue of Thomas Munro in The Island, Chennai

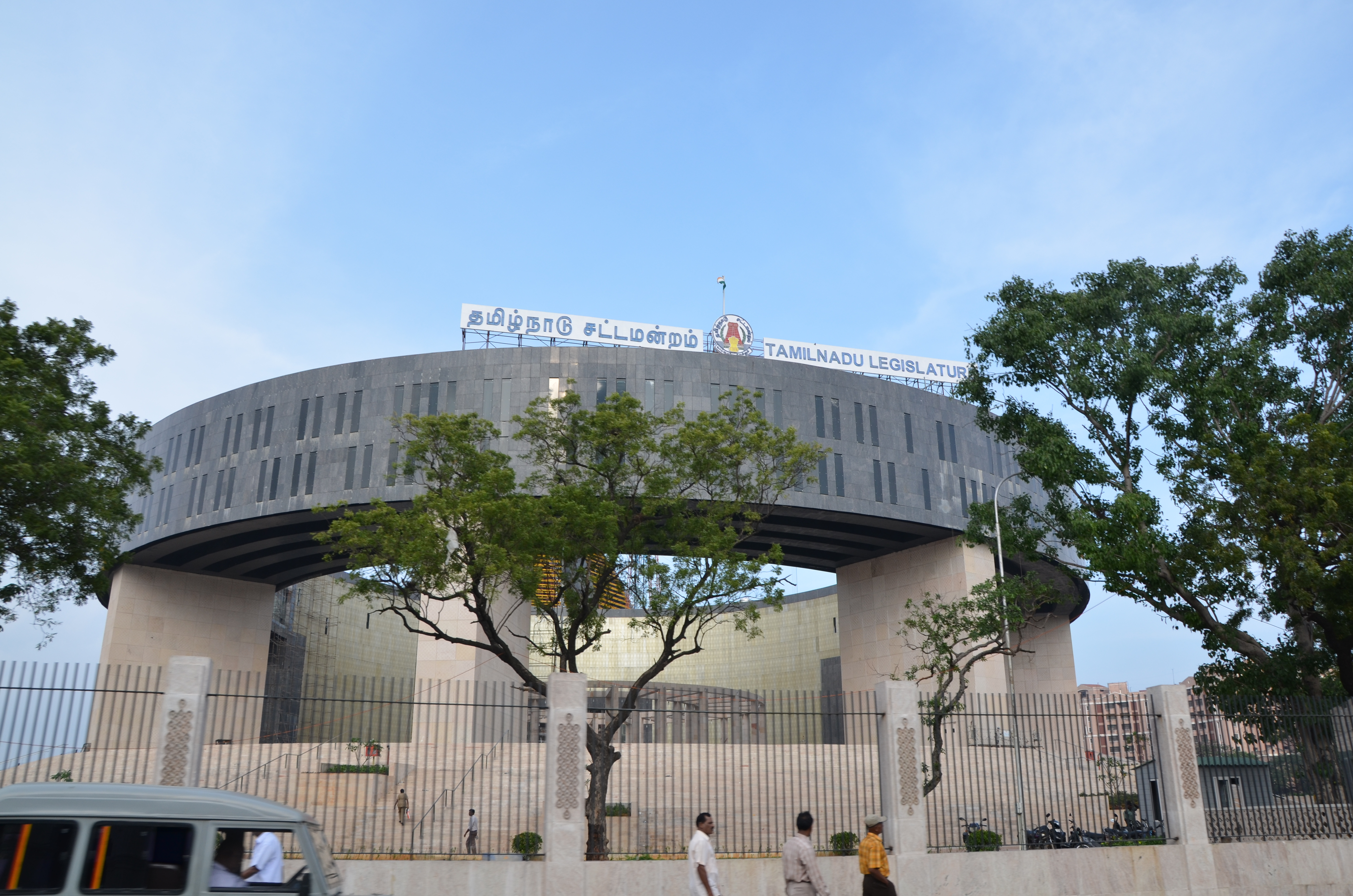
The Tamil Nadu Omandurar Government Multi Speciality Hospital and Medical College

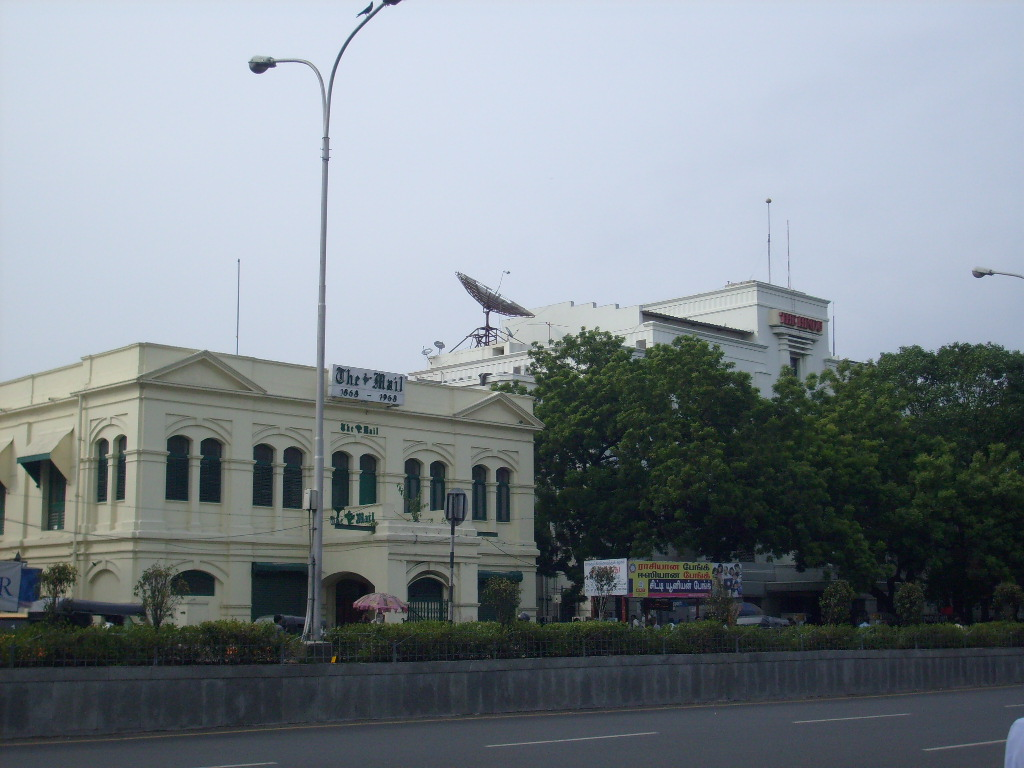
The offices of The Hindu and the now-defunct The Mail in Anna Salai

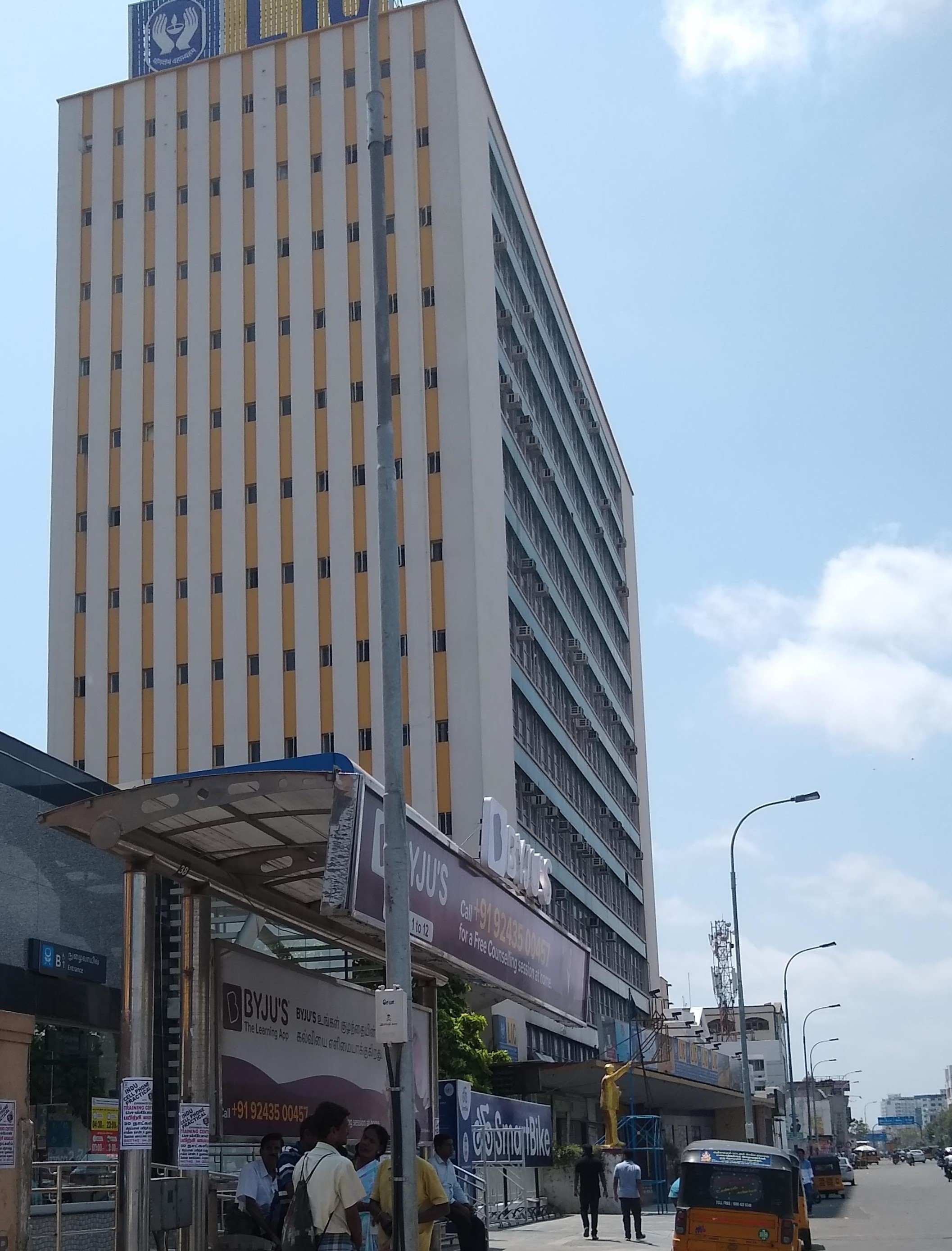
LIC Building

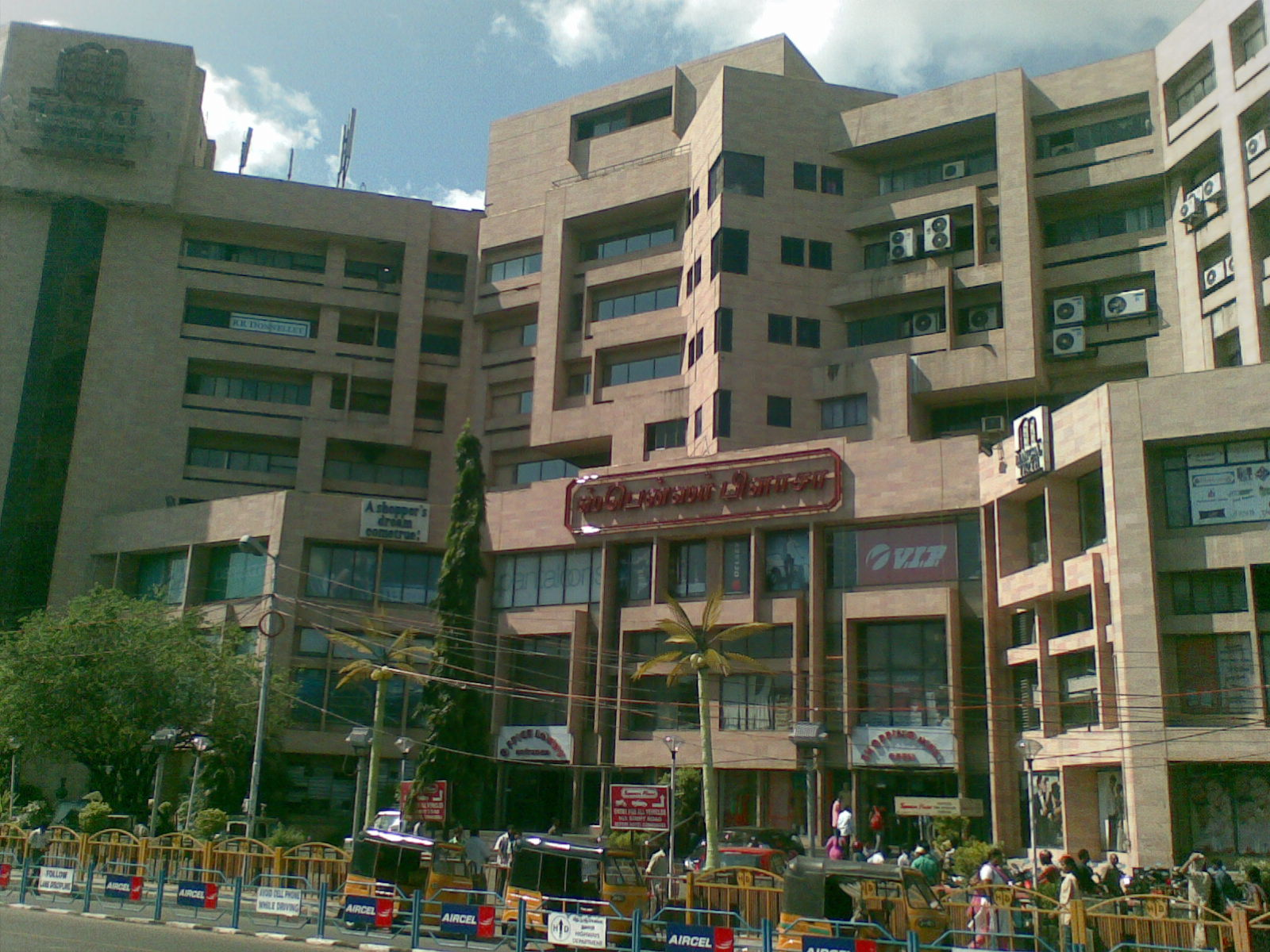
Spencer Plaza from Anna Salai

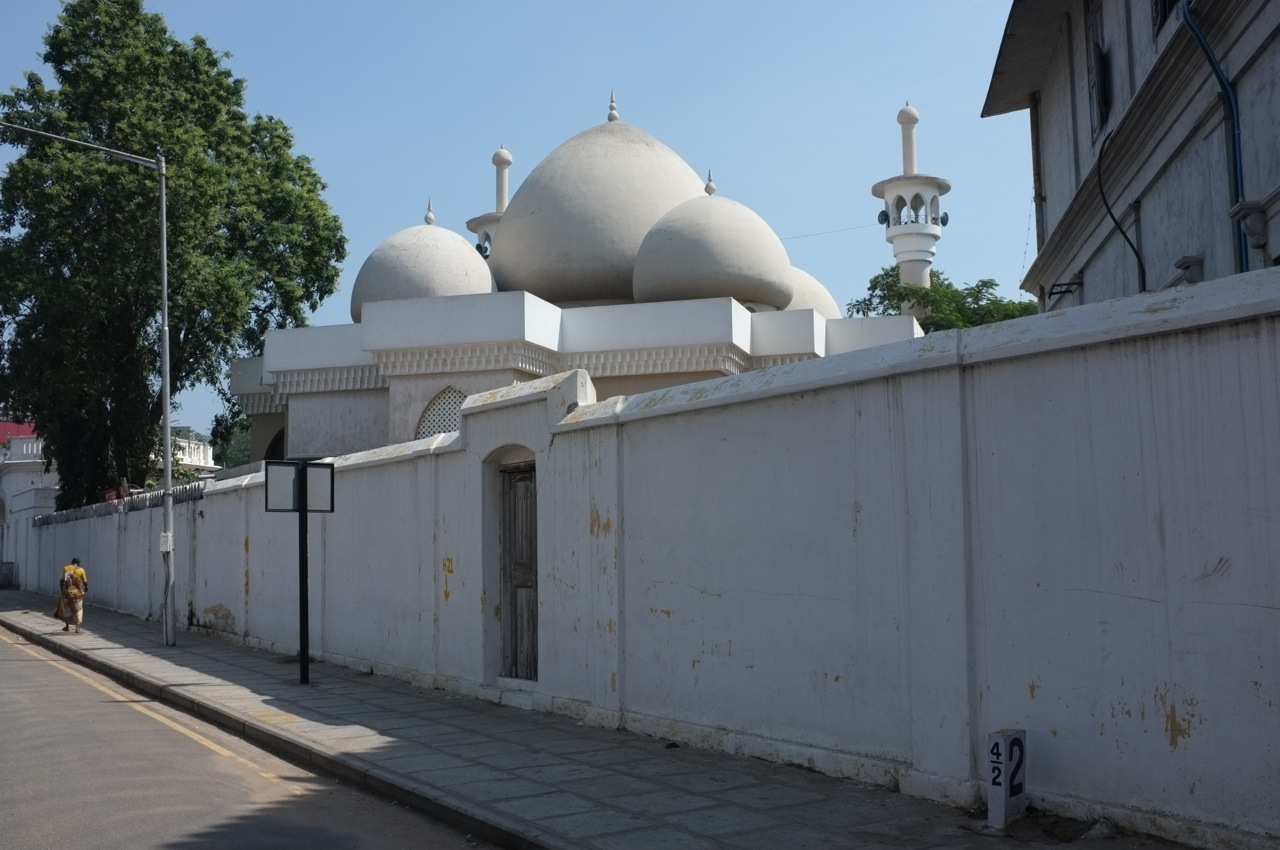
Thousand Lights Mosque

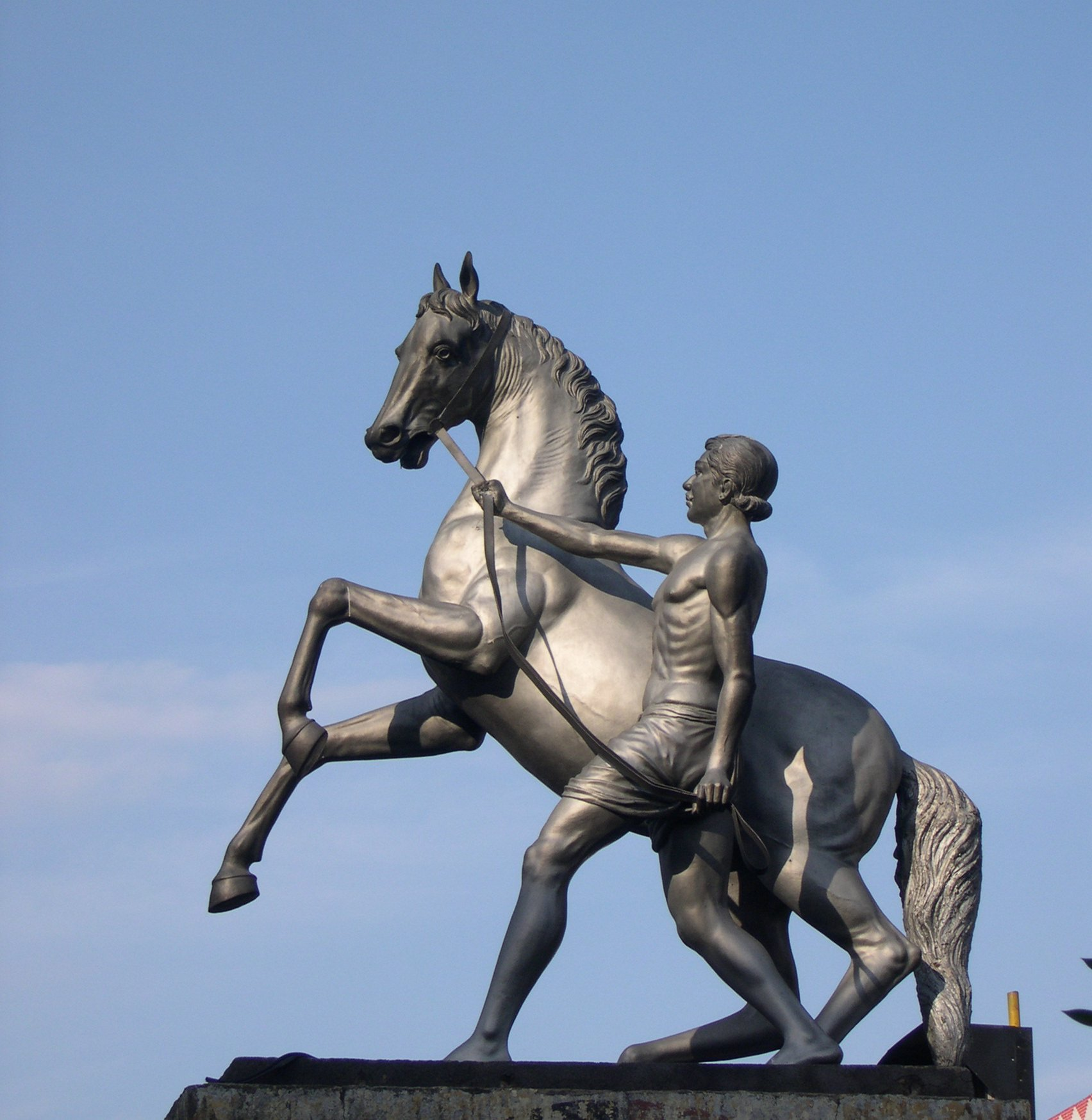
Equestrian Statue on the Nungambakkam side of Anna (Gemini) fly over.

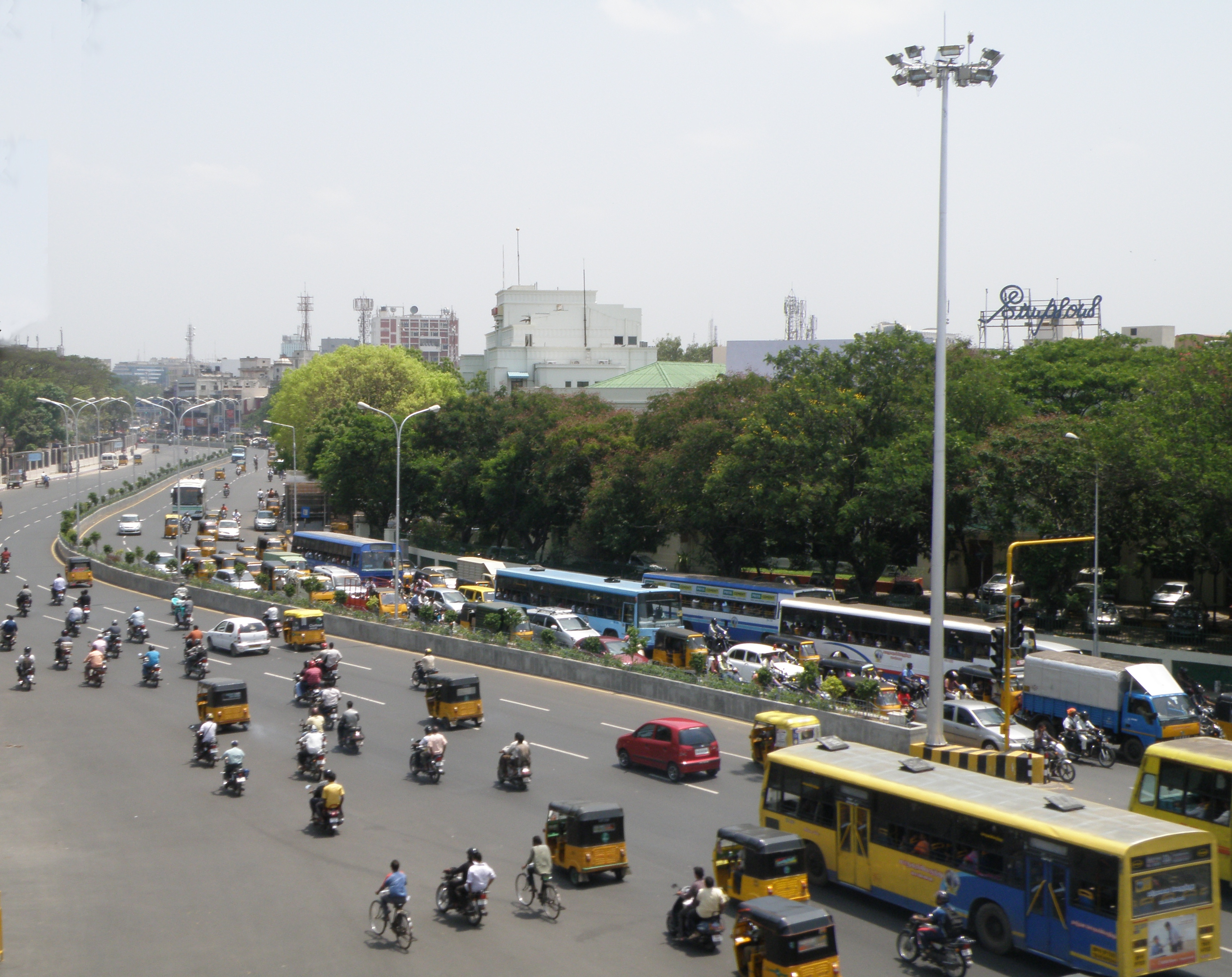
Near Willingdon Bridge, seen from Chennai MRTS

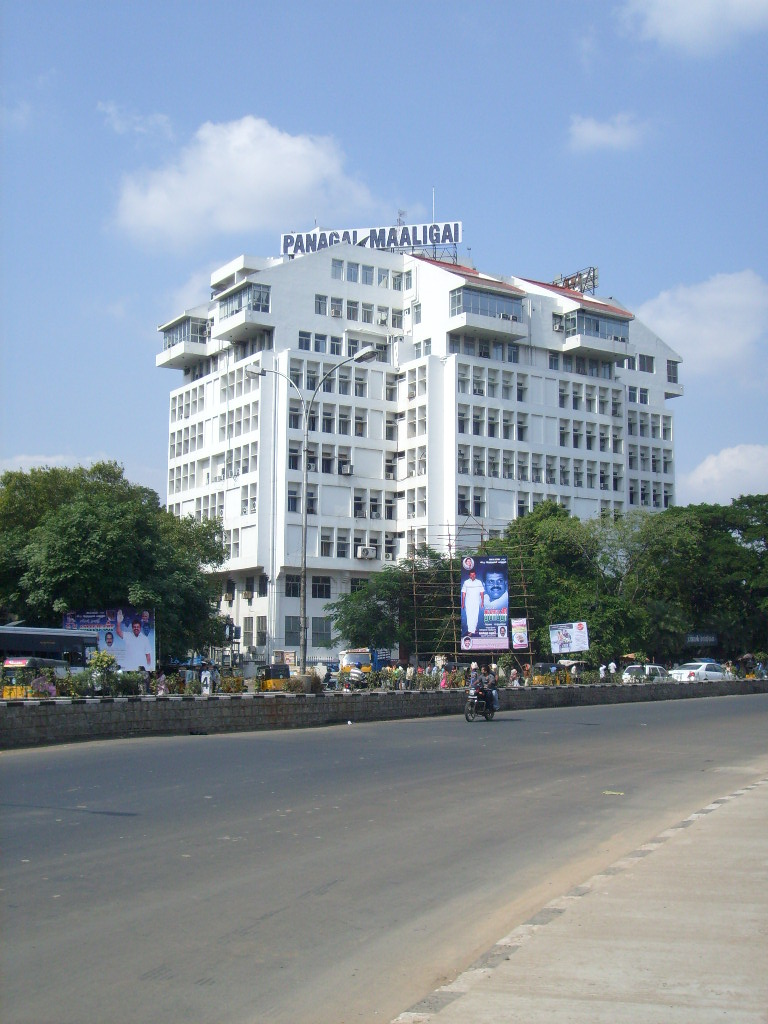
Panagal Maaligai or Panagal Building, Saidapet

== See also ==
- Transport in Chennai
