= SPIC building, Chennai =

SPIC House, Chennai
- Interactive map of the SPIC House, Chennai area

General information
- Type: Commercial offices
- Architectural style: Modernism
- Location: 88 Anna Salai, Guindy, Chennai, Tamil Nadu 600 032, Chennai, India
- Coordinates: 13°0′42″N 80°13′7″E
- Opened: 1977; 49 years ago
- Renovated: 1993
- Owner: Southern Petrochemical Industries Corp Ltd.

Technical details
- Floor count: 10 (main building); 8 (annexe building)

Design and construction
- Architecture firm: East Coast Constructions & Industries Ltd.

Website
- spic.in

SPIC building, Chennai, is one of the oldest skyscrapers of the city. Earlier, it was popularly known as "twin towers of Chennai." The main building has 10 floors and Annexe building has 8 floors. It houses the headquarters of Southern Petrochemical Industries Corp. Ltd., a joint venture between the MA Chidambaram Group and the Tamil Nadu Industrial Development Corp. Ltd (TIDCO). It is one of the Asia's largest fertilizer factories located in southern part of India. The building is built facing Guindy railway station, on Anna Salai.

The SPIC administrative building was built in 1977 and Annexe building in the year 1993. However, one of the two buildings still stand, the other being sold and partly demolished, underscoring the declining fortunes of the company.

== Consulates ==
The building houses honorary consulates of Belgium and the Philippines.

== Energy conservation ==
The building receives 11 kV power from Tamil Nadu Electricity Board. The contracted demand is 1,300 kVA. The 11 kV supply is converted to 440 volts through two 1 mVA transformers. The average energy consumption is 9,000 (kWhr) units per day. Of the 9,000 units, two-thirds of the consumption is consumed by air-conditioning system. Both the main and the annexe buildings are fully air-conditioned. However, in the main building, which is more than 20 years old, energy conservation efforts are not initiated.

== See also ==
- List of tallest buildings in Chennai
