= Safire Theatre complex =

Former multiple-theatre complex in Chennai, India

Coordinates: 13.0540°N 80.2526°E

The Safire Theatre complex was India's first largest multi-theatre complex located in the southern city of Chennai that functioned from 1964 to 1994. The theatre complex was located on Mount Road (now Anna Salai) and consisted of three screening halls, namely, Safire, Blue Diamond, and Emerald. While the largest named Safire screened Hollywood movies, the other two, Emerald and Diamond screened Indian films.

Safire was considered to be the first 70 mm theatre in India.

== History ==
Started by the Veecumsee family, Safire opened its door to the public in 1964. The first movie to play in Safire was Cleopatra. Safire was perhaps the first 70 mm theatre in India. It was spacious, if a bit spartan in furniture, and for the first few years screened only English language films. My Fair Lady, Sound of Music, Lawrence of Arabia, Funny Girl, and It's a Mad, Mad, Mad, Mad World were some of the early movies.

The Safire complex was India's first multiplex with three halls namely: Safire, Emerald and Blue Diamond. Both Blue Diamond and Emerald were small theatres with about 300 seats at the most. Blue Diamond had continuous screenings from morning until midnight. It almost exclusively screened English films. Emerald screened primarily Hindi and Tamil films.

The complex was acquired in 1994 by the local All India Anna Dravida Munnetra Kazhagam (AIADMK) political organization. which wanted to construct its new headquarters. The entire Safire complex was demolished, but AIADMK did not end up building its headquarters there and eventually put the nearly one acre land area up for sale in 2012.
