= List of hotels in India =

This is a list of notable hotels in India organized by state. It includes highly rated luxury hotels, skyscraper rated buildings, and historic hotels. It is not a directory of every chain or independent hotel building in India.

== Delhi ==
- Ashok Hotel, Delhi
- Hyatt Regency Delhi
- Imperial Hotel, New Delhi
- Maidens Hotel, Delhi
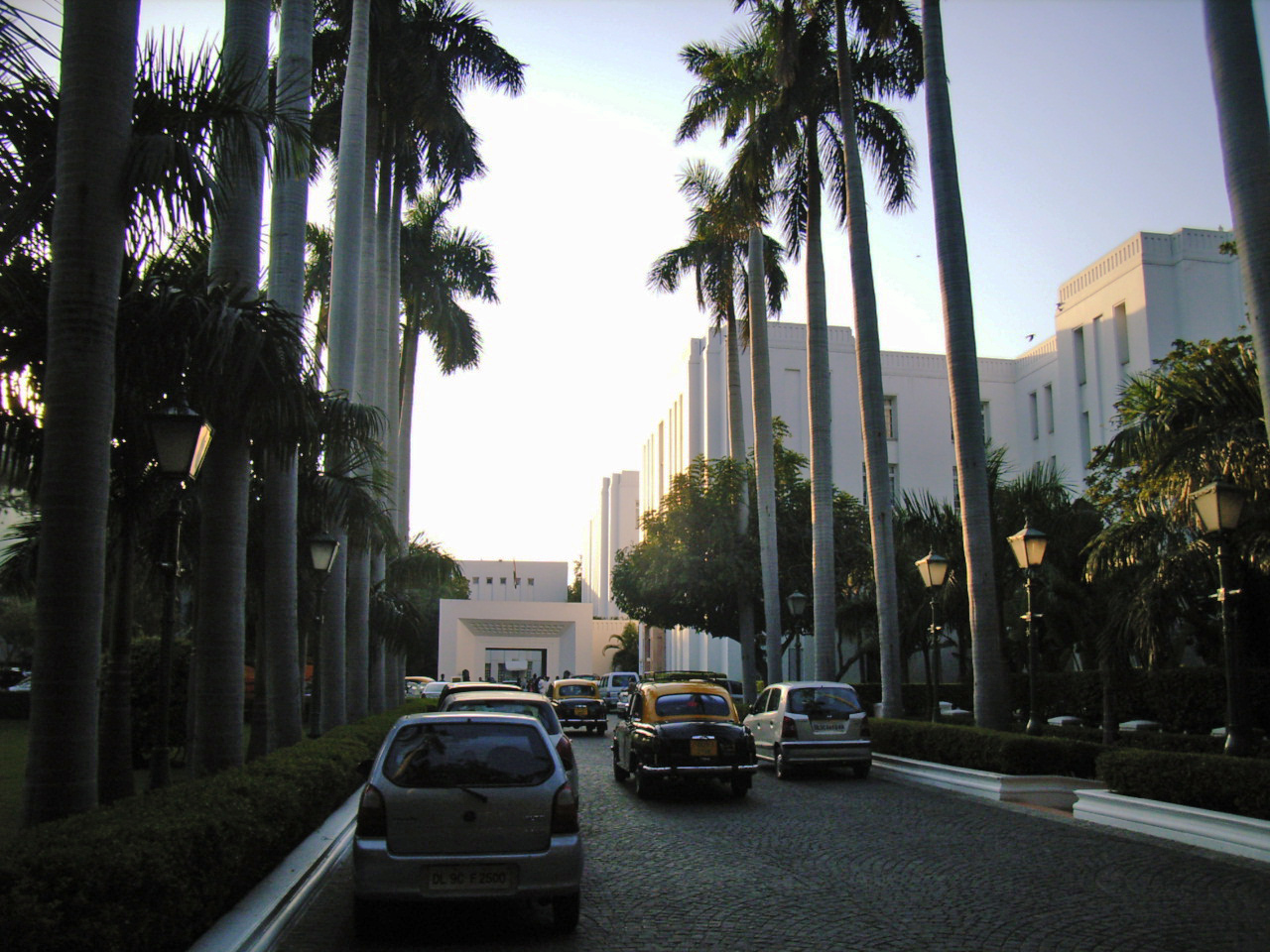
The Imperial, New Delhi

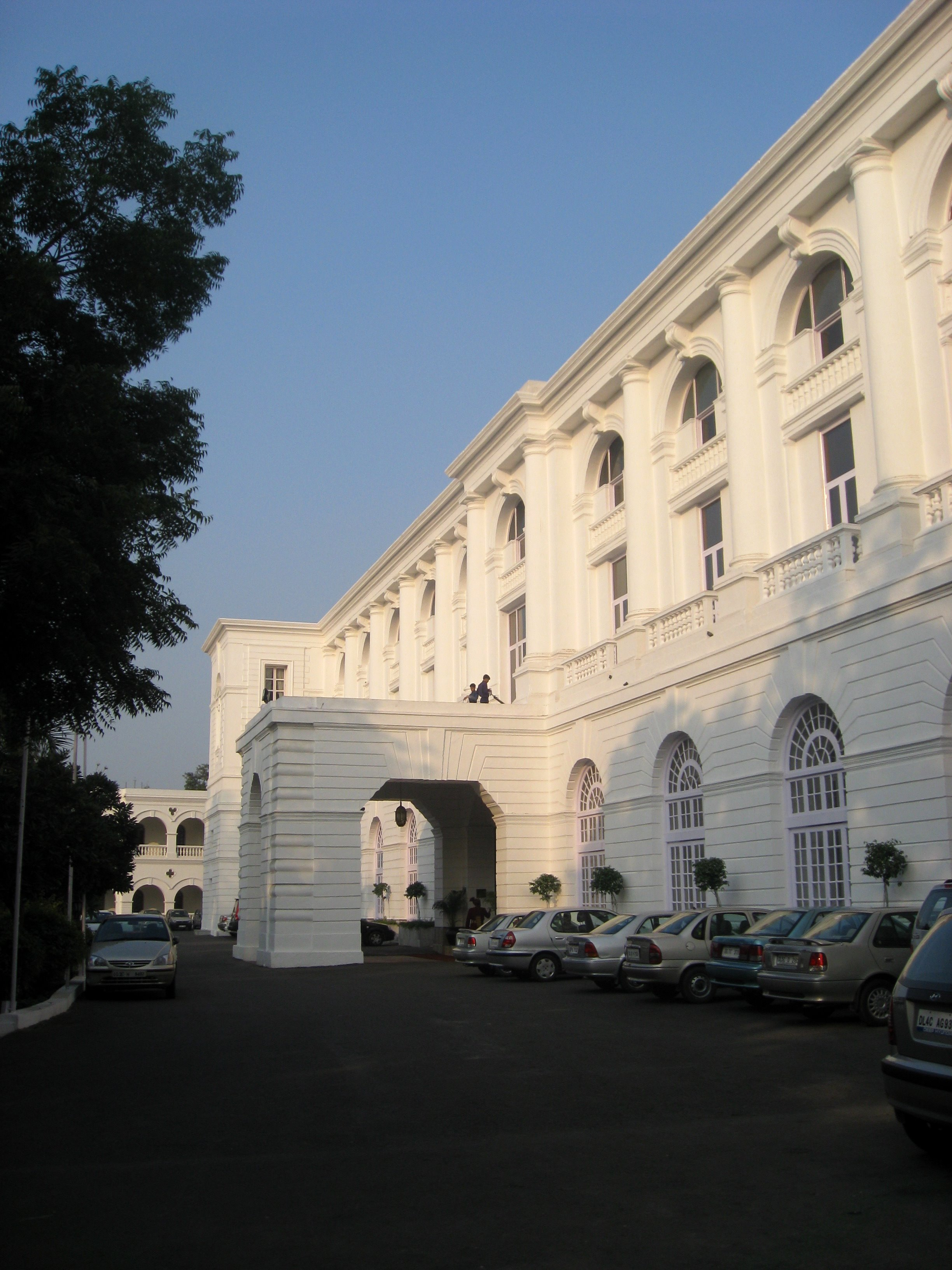
Oberoi Maidens Hotel, Delhi

== Goa ==
- Grand Hyatt Goa
- Planet Hollywood Goa
- Ronil Royale
- Taj Fort Aguada Resort

== Haryana ==
- Nahar Singh Mahal
- The Oberoi, Gurgaon

== Himachal Pradesh ==
- The Cecil, Shimla
- Peterhoff, Shimla

== Jammu and Kashmir ==
- Hari Niwas Palace, Jammu

== Karnataka ==
- Jayamahal Palace Hotel
- Lalitha Mahal
- Rajendra Vilas
- Ritz-Carlton Bangalore
- Taj West End Bangalore

== Kerala ==
- Bolgatty Palace
- Mascot Hotel
- The Raviz

== Madhya Pradesh ==
- Usha Kiran Palace

== Maharashtra ==
- Four Seasons Hotel Mumbai, Mumbai
- Grand Hyatt Mumbai
- Shalini Palace, Kolhapur
- Taj Mahal Palace and Tower, Mumbai
- Trident Hotel, Nariman Point, Mumbai
- Watson's Hotel, Mumbai
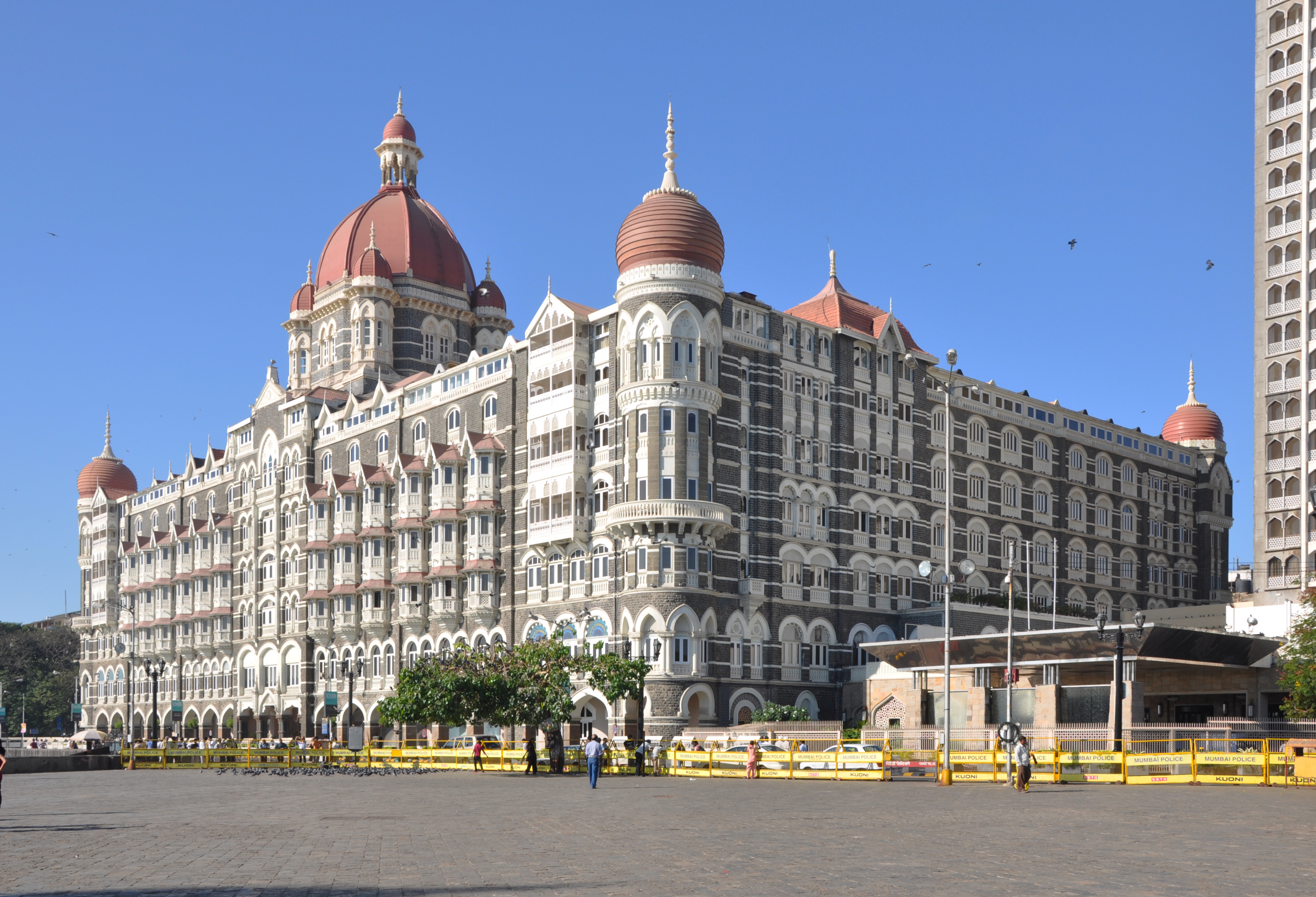
Taj Mahal Palace and Tower, Mumbai

== North Goa ==
- Ronil Royale

== Puducherry ==
- Hotel de l'Orient, Pondicherry

== Rajasthan ==
- Bissau Palace Hotel
- Devigarh, Udaipur
- Diggi Palace. Jaipur
- Hill Fort Kesroli, Alwar
- Lake Palace, Udaipur
- Lalgarh Palace, Bikaner
- Laxmi Niwas Palace, Bikaner
- LMB Hotel, Jaipur
- The Raj Palace, Jaipur
- Rambagh Palace, Jaipur
- Ravla Khempur, Khempur
- Roopangarh Fort, Roopangarh
- Samode Palace, Samode
- Shiv Niwas Palace, Udaipur
- Umaid Bhawan Palace,
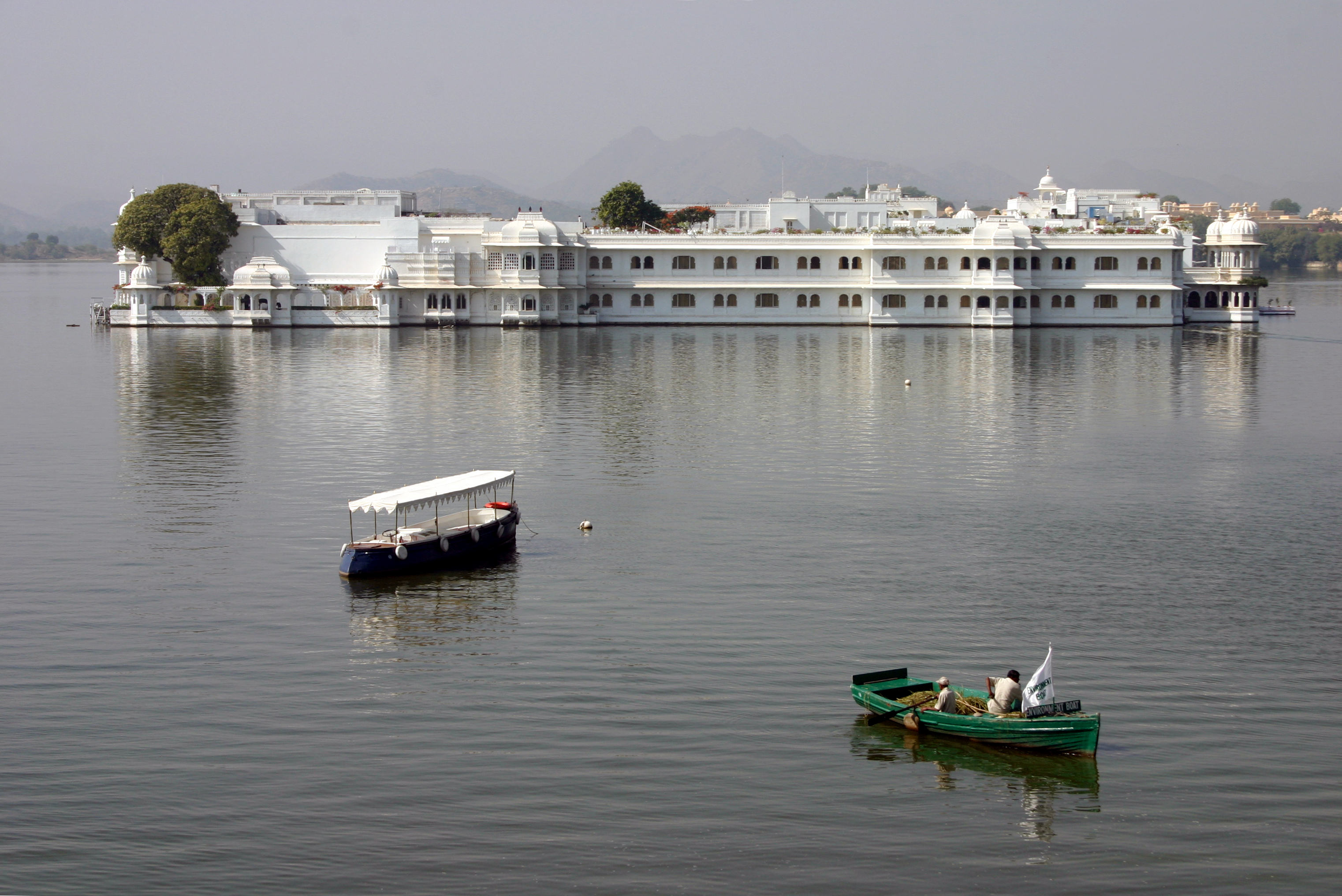
Lake Palace, Udaipur

== Tamil Nadu ==
- Accord Metropolitan, Chennai
- Crowne Plaza Chennai Adyar Park, Chennai
- WelcomHeritage Fernhills Royal Palace, Ooty
- Hilton Chennai
- Hyatt Regency, Chennai
- ITC Grand Chola, Chennai
- Elite Grand Hotel, Chennai
- Le Royal Meridien, Chennai
- The Leela Palace Chennai
- The Park, Chennai
- Park Hyatt, Chennai
- Radisson Blu City Centre, Chennai
- Radisson Blu Hotel, Chennai
- The Raintree Hotel Anna Salai, Chennai
- Raintree Hotel, St Mary's Road, Chennai
- Residency Towers, Chennai
- Savera Hotel, Chennai
- Taj Club House, Chennai
- Taj Connemara, Chennai
- Taj Coromandel, Chennai
- Taj Fisherman's Cove Resort & Spa, Chennai
- Trident, Chennai
- Welcomhotel Chennai
- Welcomhotel Kences Palm Beach, Chennai
- Welcomhotel GST, Chennai
- Westin, Chennai
- West Downs - The Heritage Resort, Ooty
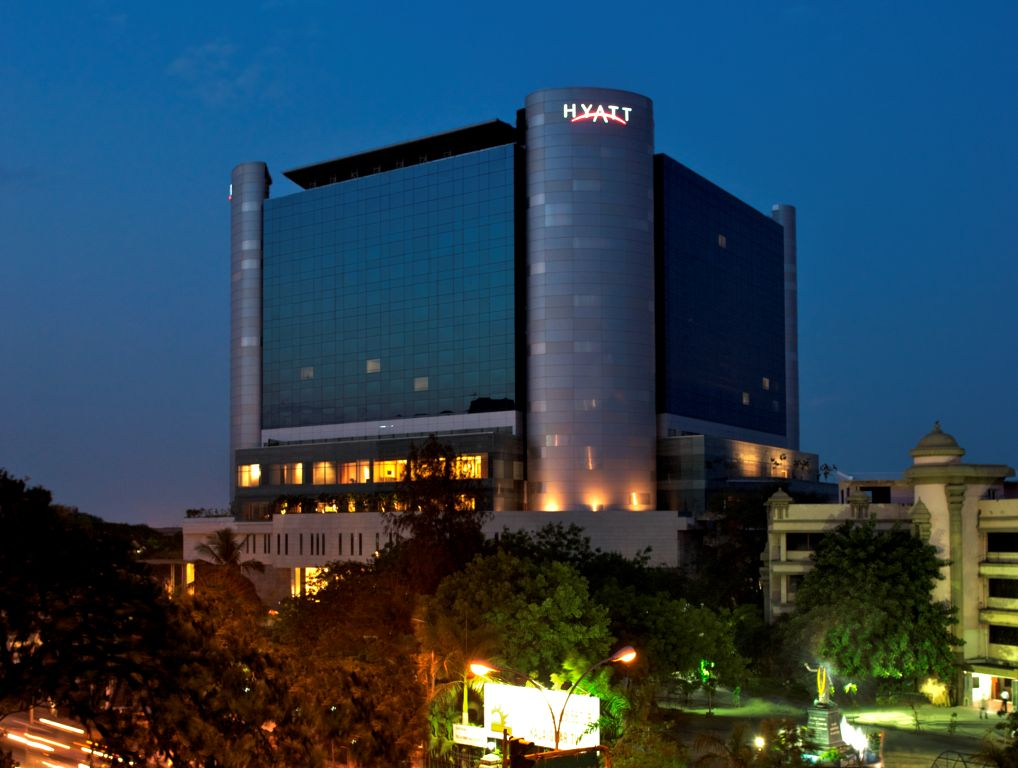
Hyatt Regency, Chennai

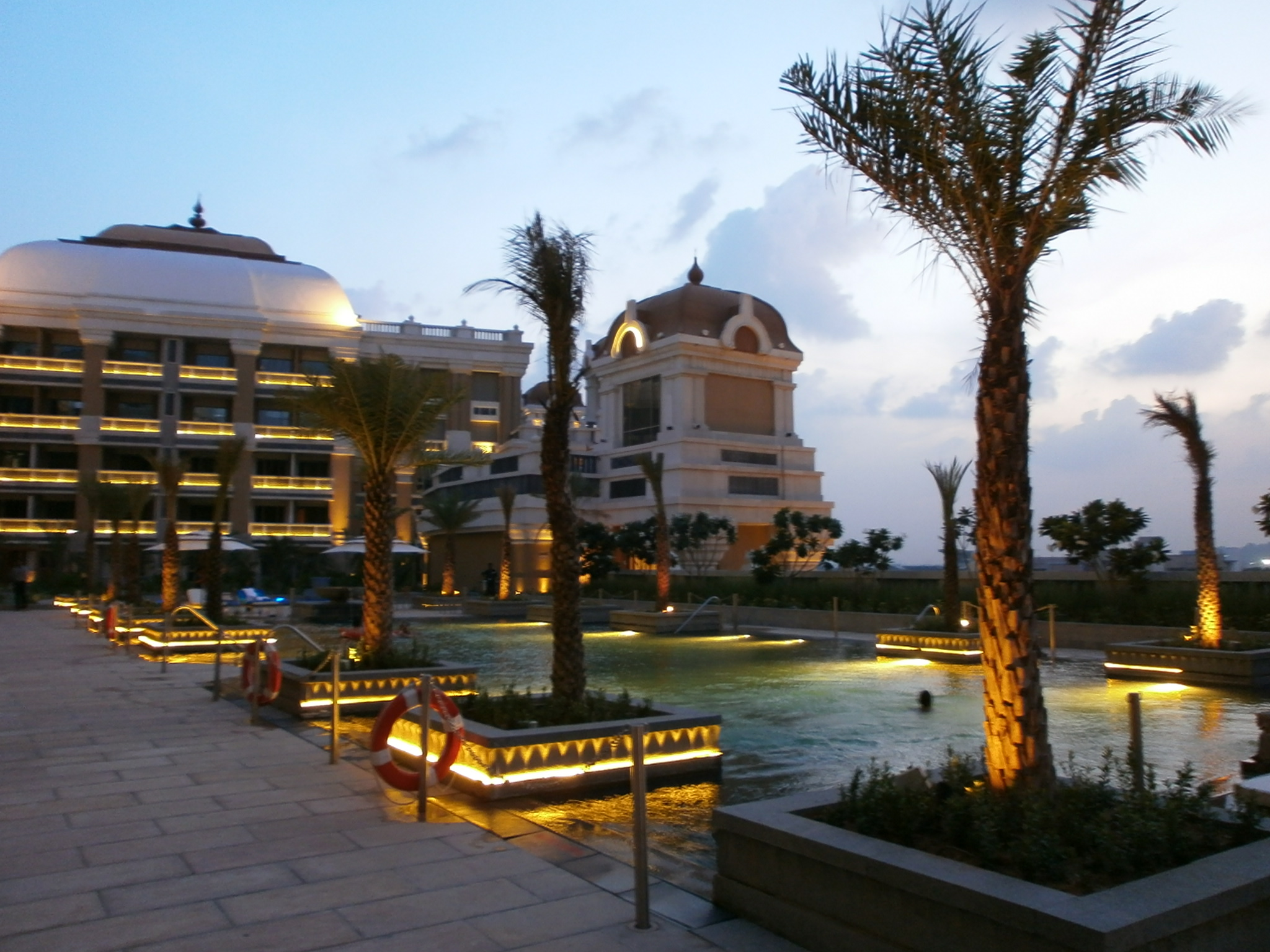
ITC Grand Chola, Chennai

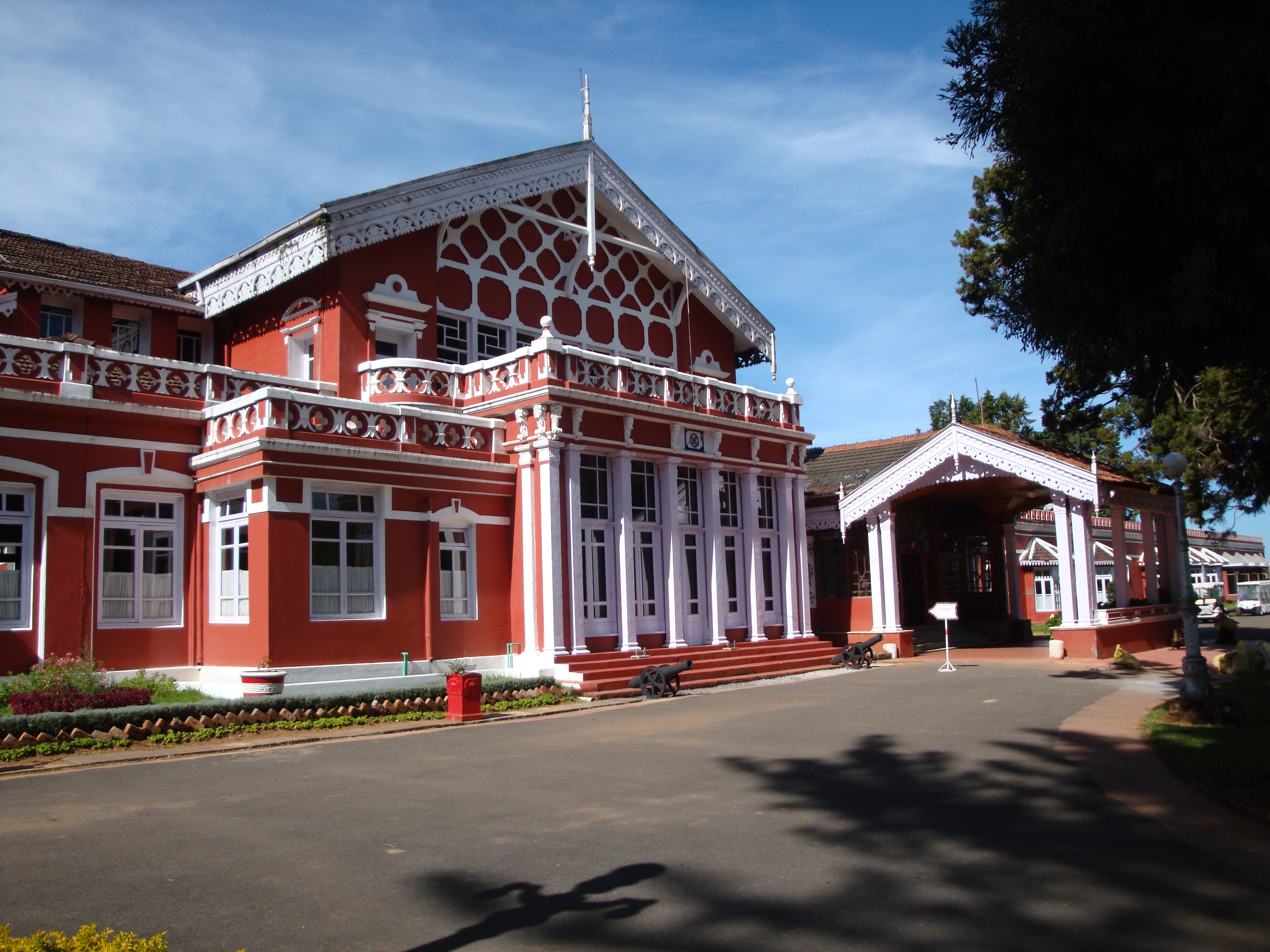
The Fernhills Palace, Ooty

== Telangana ==
- Park Hyatt, Hyderabad
- Taj Falaknuma Palace, Hyderabad
- Taj Mahal Hotel, Abids
- The Golkonda hotel, Hyderabad

== Uttar Pradesh ==
- Fort Madhogarh, Madhogarh

== Uttarakhand ==
- Savoy Hotel, Mussoorie, Dehradun

== West Bengal ==
- ITC Royal Bengal, Kolkata
- Elgin Fairlawn, Kolkata
- The Elgin Hotel, Darjeeling
- Great Eastern Hotel, Kolkata
- Jhargram Palace, Jhargram district
- The Oberoi Grand, Kolkata
- Spence's Hotel, Kolkata
- Windamere Hotel, Darjeeling
- Jaltaranga Eco Resort,Gadiara,Howrah

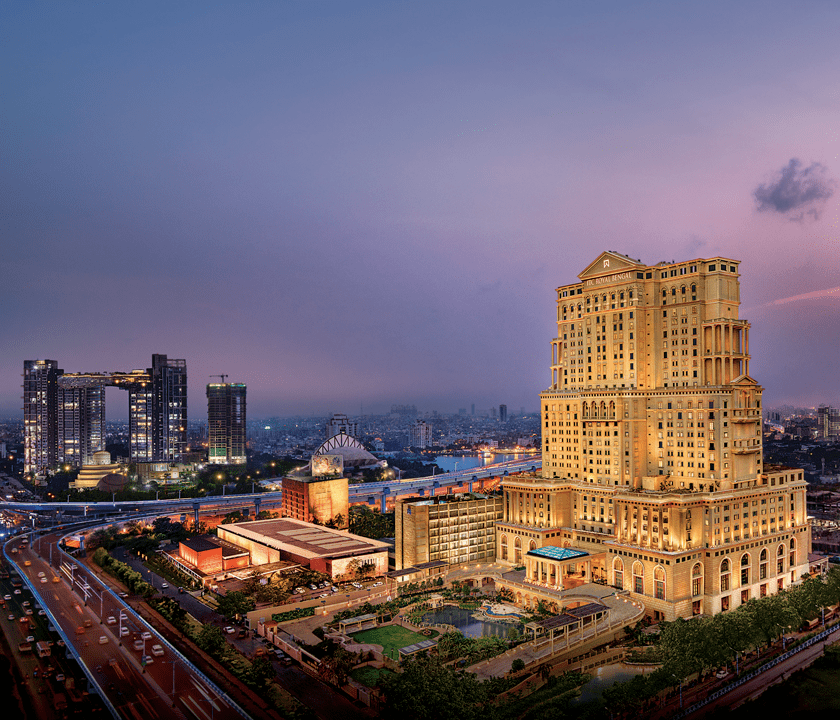
ITC Royal Bengal, Kolkata

== See also ==
- Lists of hotels – an index of hotel list articles on Wikipedia
- Tourism in India
