= List of hotels in Bengaluru =

This article lists the notable hotels in Bengaluru, India.

== List of completed hotels ==
Hotel	Parent Company	Location	Number of rooms	Number of floors	Year of opening	Star rating	Notes	Image
Jayamahal Palace Hotel		Jayamahal Road	48		1892			
Taj West End Bangalore	Indian Hotels Company Limited	Race Course Road	117		1887	5-star	Built in 1887, its the oldest hotel in the city.	
Ritz-Carlton Bangalore	Ritz Carlton	Residency Road, Shanti Nagar	277		2013	5-star	The first luxury Ritz Carlton hotel in India.	
JW Marriott Bangalore	Marriott International	Vittal Mallya Road, Shanti Nagar	297		2013	5-star	First JW Marriott hotel in Bengaluru.	

== See also ==
- List of hotels in India
