= Srinivasa IV Rao Sahib =

- Raja
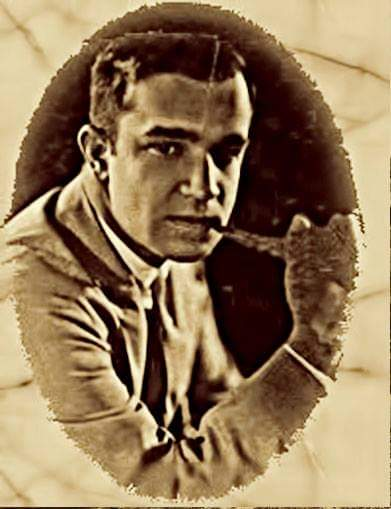

12th Raja of Arni jagir
- Reign: 1931 – 1948
- Predecessor: Raja Thirumala IV Rao Sahib
- Successor: Raja Venkata II Rao Saheb
- Born: 1904
- Died: 1989
- Spouse: Sushila Purnaiah
- Issue: Raja Venkata II Rao Saheb; Ramachandra Rao Saheb; Ranganatha Rao Sahib
- Father: Raja Thirumala IV Rao Sahib
- Religion: Hinduism

Srinivasa IV Rao Sahib was twelfth ruler of the Jagir of Arni of British Raj during the reign (1931 – 1948).

== Early life ==
Srinivasara Rao Sahib was born in 1904 to 11th Jagirdar of Arni jagir Raja Thirumala IV Rao Sahib in North Arcot, Madras Presidency. He competed his school education at Bishop Cotton Boys' School, Bangalore. He completed his college studies in Newington College and Madras Christian College and became a barrister. He married Sushila Purnaiah, who was the daughter of 6th Jagirdar of Yelandur estate.

Srinivasa IV Rao Sahib Royal family of Arni Born: c. 1904
Regnal titles
Preceded by Raja Thirumala IV Rao Sahib	Raja of the Arni jagir 1931 – 1948	Succeeded by Raja Venkata II Rao Saheb
