= Ritz-Carlton Bangalore =

Hotel in Bengaluru, India

- Interactive map of the Ritz-Carlton Bangalore area
- Hotel chain: Ritz Carlton

General information
- Location: Bengaluru, India
- Coordinates: 12.97°N 77.60°E
- Opening: 2013
- Management: Ritz Carlton

Other information
- Number of rooms: 277

Website
- www.ritzcarlton.com/en/hotels/india/bangalore

Ritz Carlton Bangalore is a five-star hotel in Bengaluru, India. It is the first Ritz Carlton hotel in India, with an investment of ₹750 crore. It is located in the Bangalore Central Business District on Residency Road, Shanti Nagar. Ritz Carlton is a reputed brand in luxury hospitality.

== The Hotel ==
The 16-story hotel spread over three acres (1.2 ha), has 277 rooms, a 15,000 sq ft (1,400 m^{2}) spa by ESPA, six upscale food and beverage outlets and a ballroom with a capacity of 1,000 persons.

== See also ==
- List of hotels in Bengaluru
- List of hotels in India
