= Rankala Lake =

Lake in India

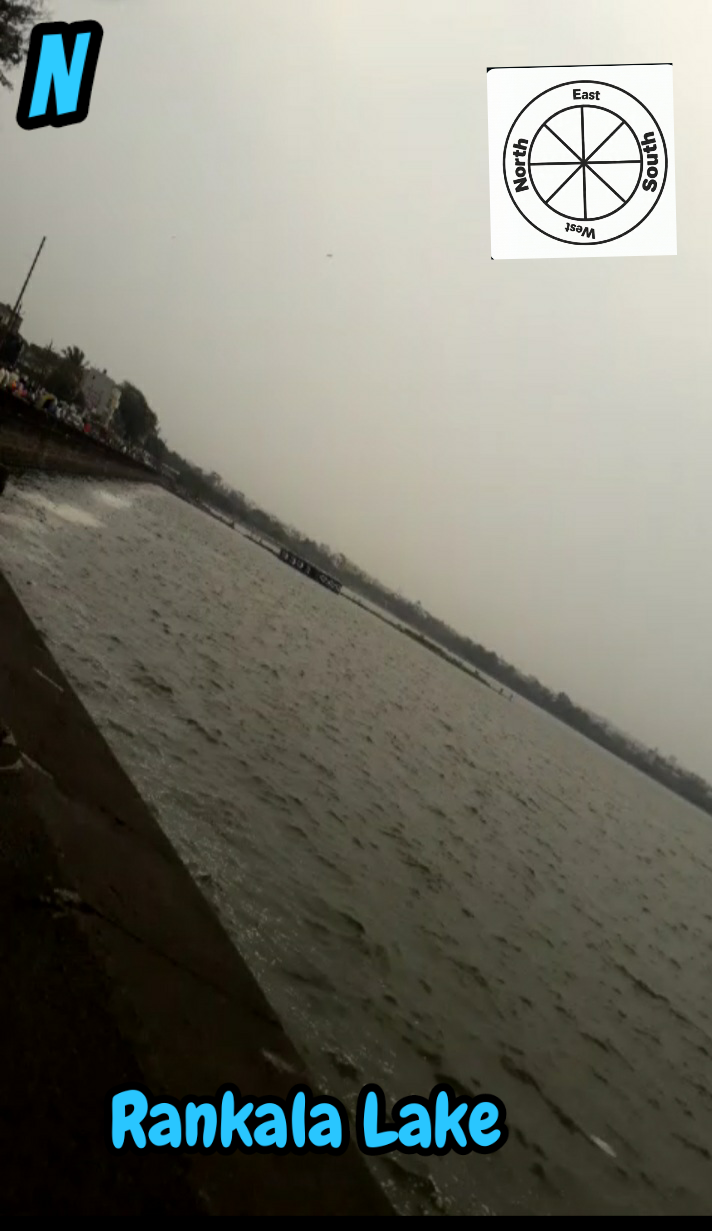

Rankala Lake is a freshwater lake located in Kolhapur, Maharashtra, India.

== History ==
Before the eighth century, Rankala was a stone quarry. In the 9th century, an earthquake caused immense structural damage to the quarry, causing water to accumulate from an underground source forming the Rankala Lake. This historic lake features a Hindu temple with a Nandi. According to local Hindu beliefs, Lord Shiva uses the Nandi, moves a single wheat grain towards the lake, and backs about a distance of single rice grain daily. Hindu beliefs state that if Lord Shiva reaches Rankala, the apocalypse will begin.

== Tourism ==
This historical lake is a treasure trove for scenery admirers. Rankala features the Shalini Palace to the north, the "Padmaraje Garden" to the northeast, and a recently developed park towards the southeast bank. Rankala's southeast park has a fresh food market. Activities like horseriding and boating can also be experienced. Shalini Palace, made up of intricately carved black stone and Italian marble, has now been converted into a hotel.

== Gallery ==
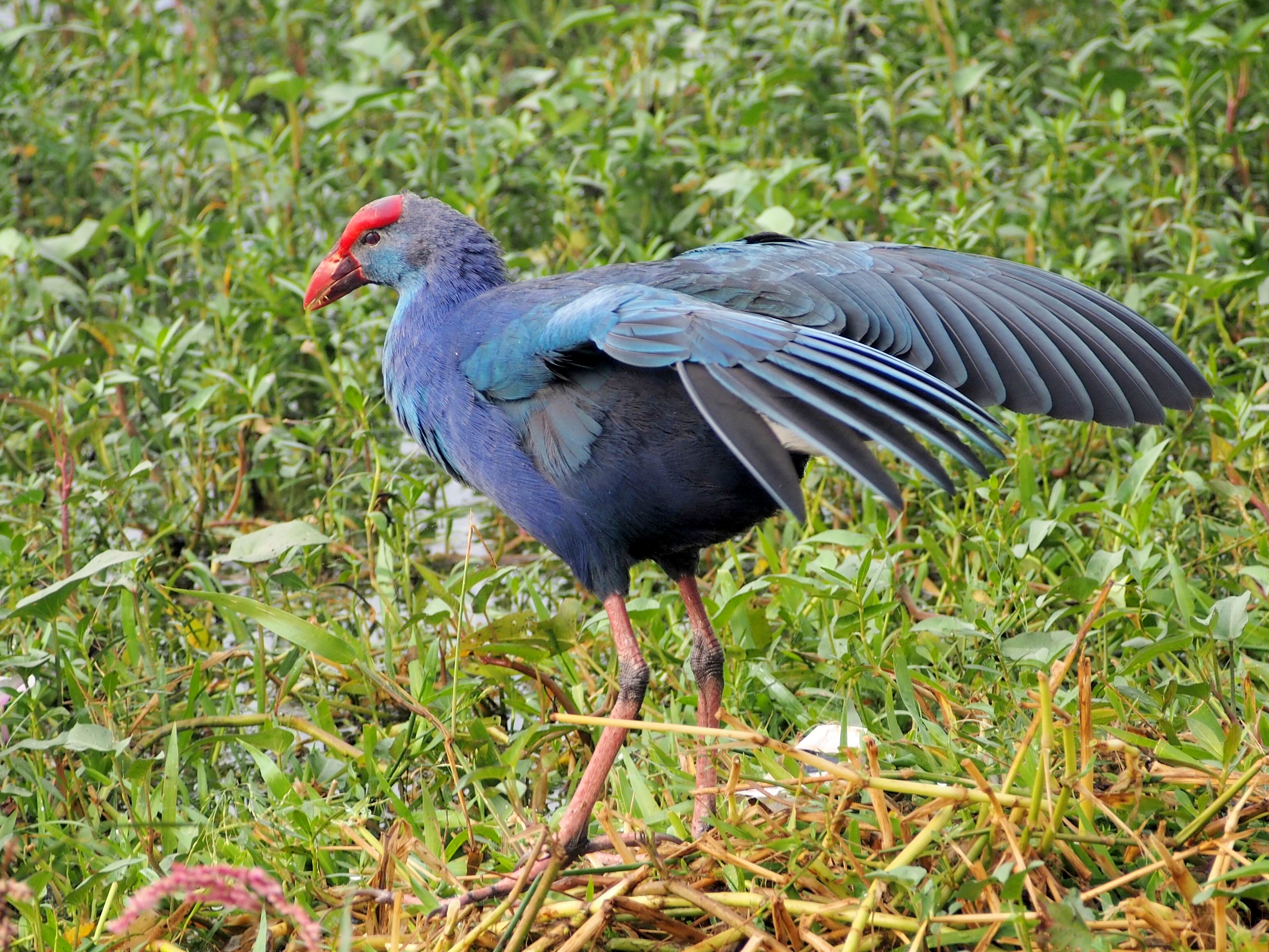
Grey-headed Swamp Hen

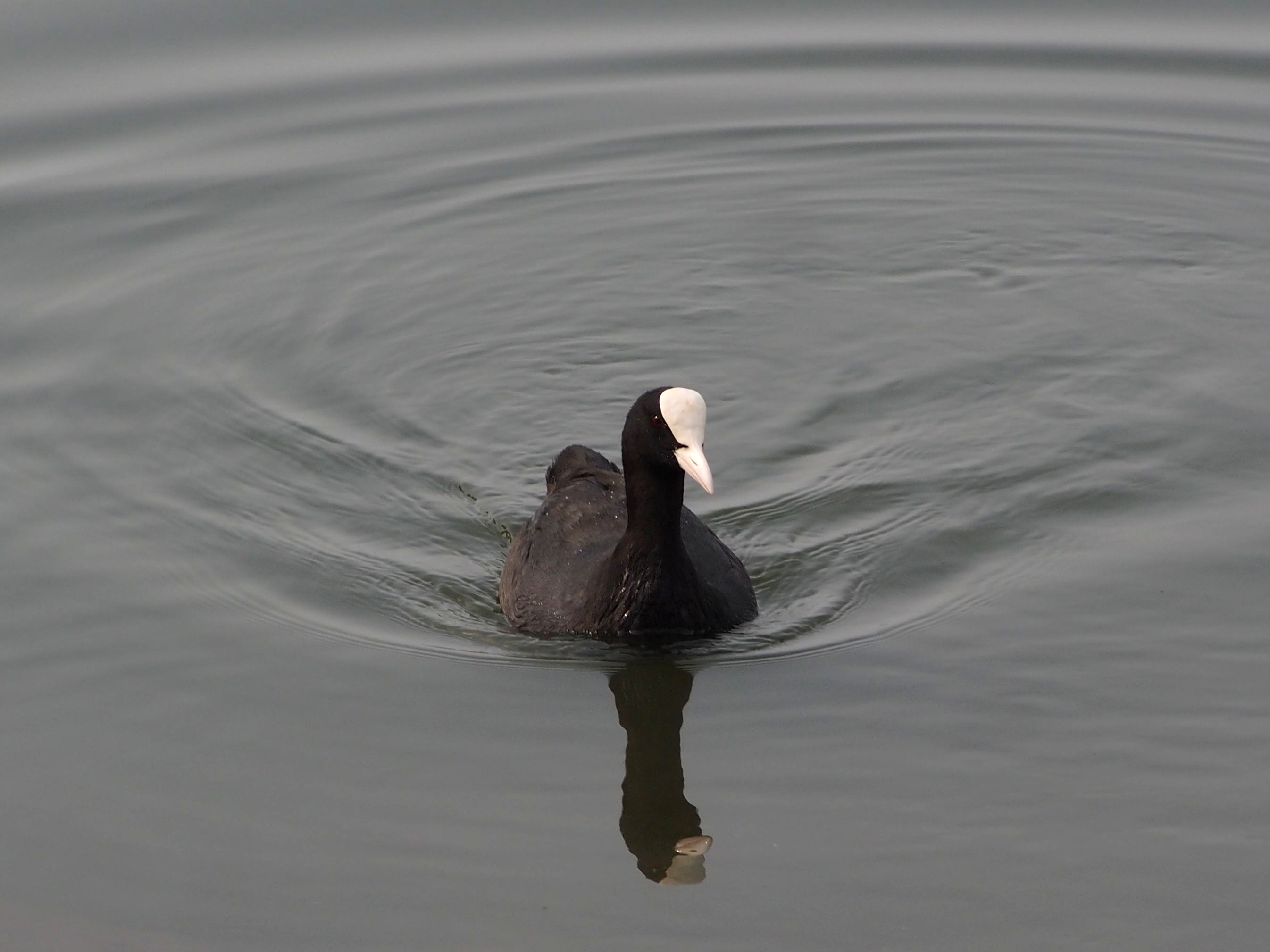
Eurasian Coot

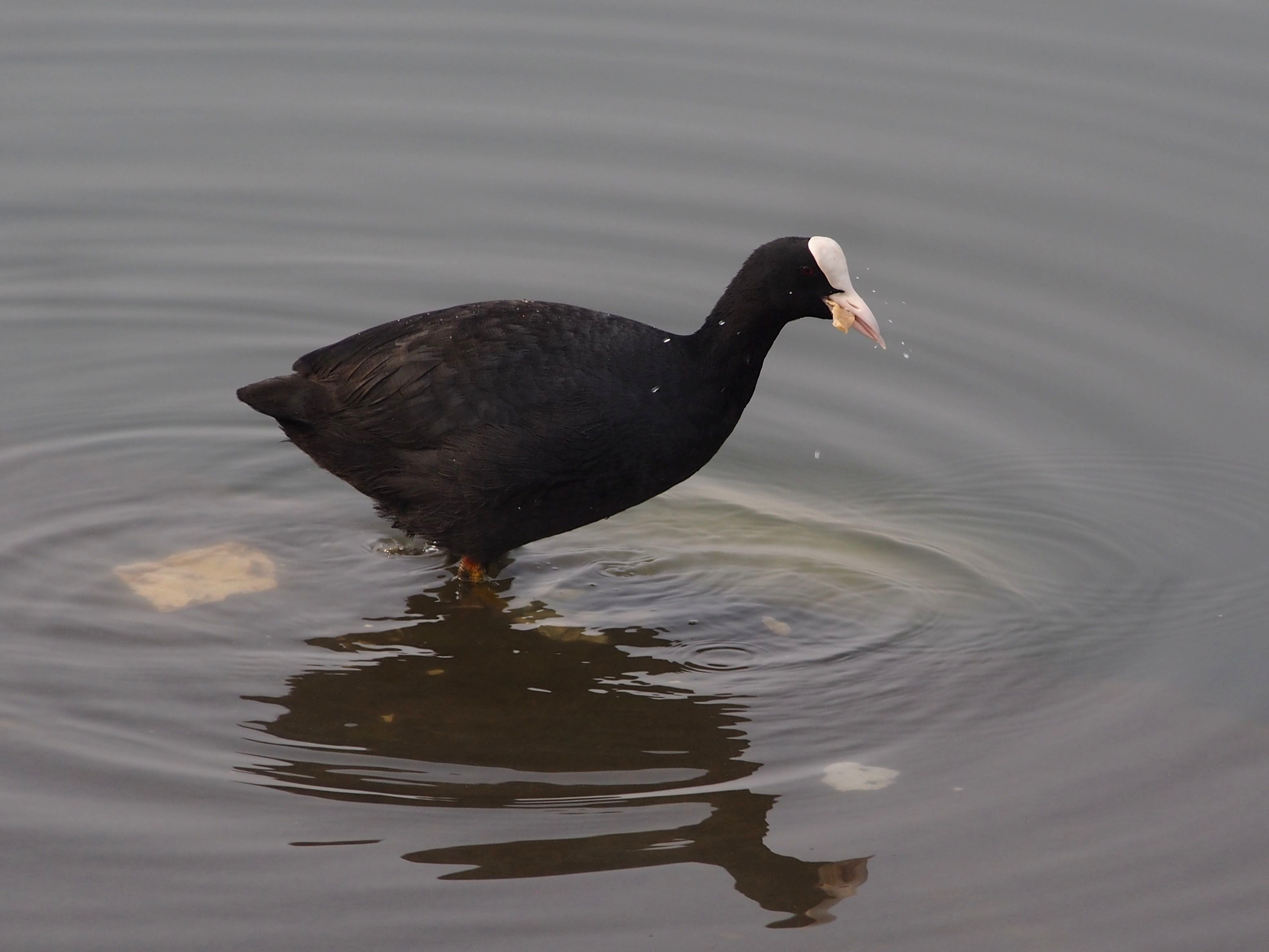
Eurasian Coot

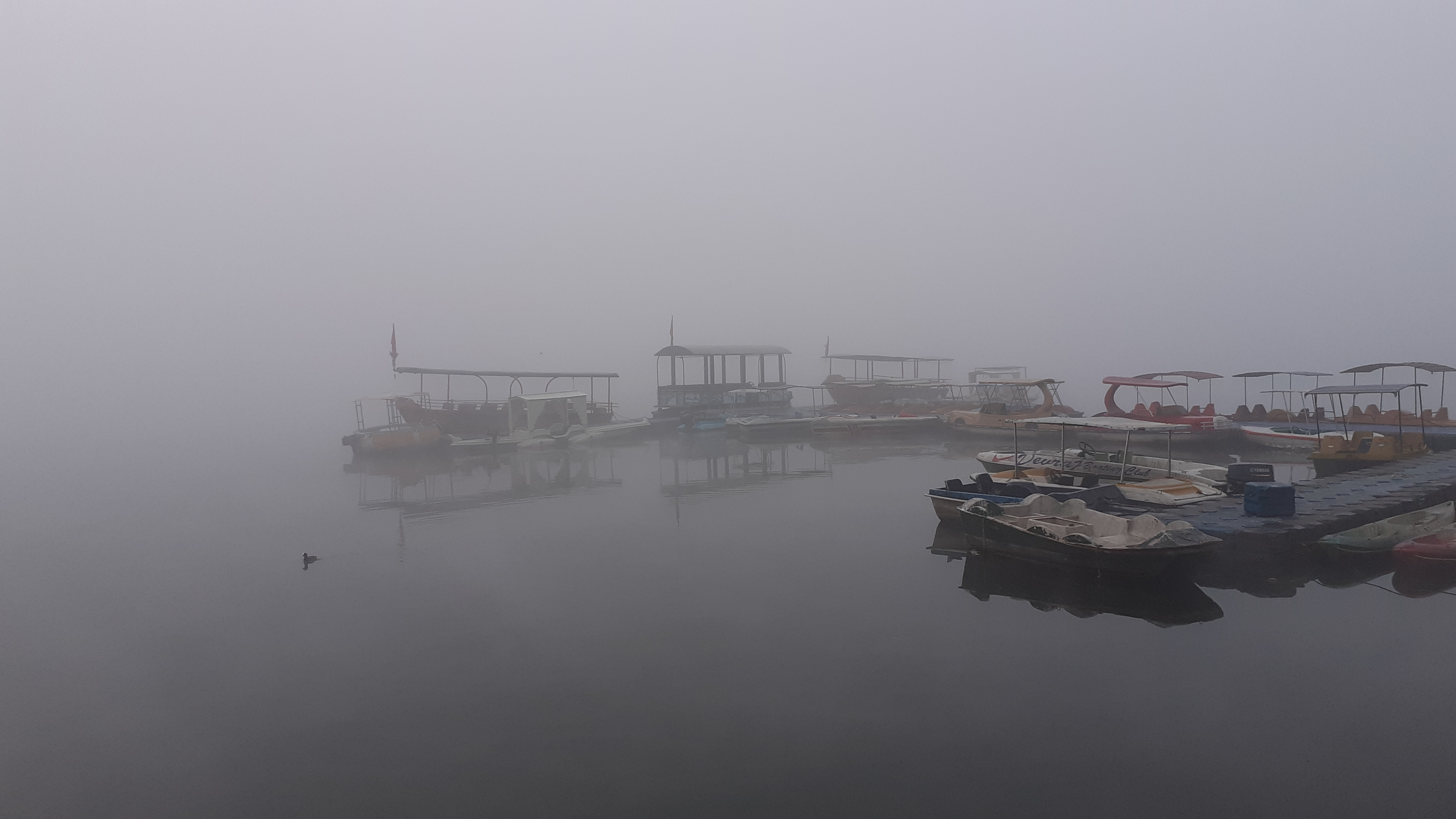
Tourist boats in a winter morning, Rankala lake
