= Arni jagir =

- Princely Estate of British Raj
- 1638–1948
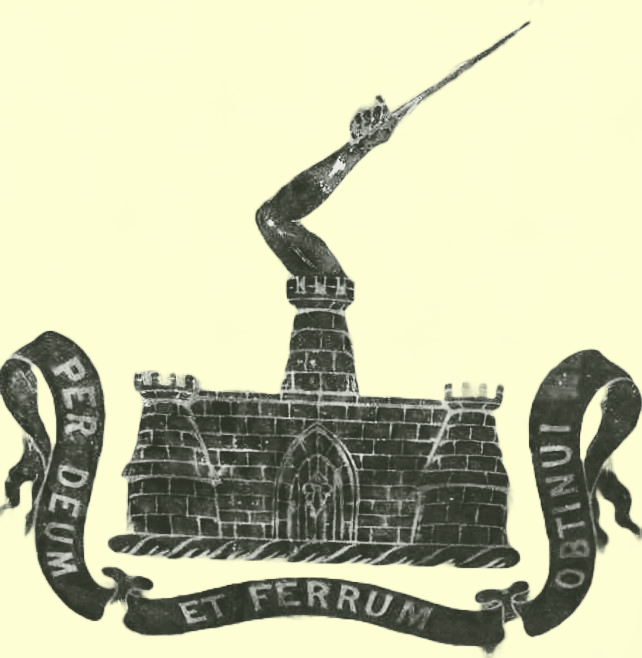
- Coat of arms
- Area
  - 1901: 546 km^{2} (211 sq mi)
- Population
  - 1901: 95,542
- History
  - Established: 1638
  - Independence of India: 1948
Succeeded by
India
- Today part of: Tamil Nadu, India

Arni Jagir was a Jagir (estate) and a permanently settled zamindari estate that existed in the North Arcot subdivision of the North Arcot district of the erstwhile Madras Presidency in British India from 1638 to 1948.

== Coat of Arms ==
The blazon of the Arni Coat of Arms is Per Deum et ferrum obtinui which means By God and my sword I have obtained.

== History ==
Arni jagir was granted to Vedaji Bhaskar Rao Pant by the Shahaji in 1638. Shivaji having failed in his negotiation, Sultanate of Bijapur took Arni and various other forts, and forcibly occupied the whole of Shahji's jagir in the Mysore. The Jagir of Arni was again granted as a gift to Vedaji Bhaskar pant by the Sultanate of Bijapur in 1640.

In early 1677 Shivaji and his military forces set out towards Golconda. He met Kootab Shah and negotiated a secret pact for a division of his intended conquests in the Carnatic ( excluding those that earlier belonged to his father, Shahaji). The spoils were to be divided between Shivaji, Kootab Shah and Bijapur. With the agreement concluded and with Kootab Shah giving him money, horses and artillery, Shivaji set out in March 1677 for his invasions via Kurnool, Cuddapah and Madras. He conquered Gingee and Vellore and contemplated seizing Tanjore. Since Tanjore and other properties had belonged to his father he tried to seize them after negotiating with his brother, Venkoji. Venkoji distrusted him and was not willing to give up his property. Shivaji did not give up and continued his battle. Vellore surrendered immediately and then Carntiegurh and two other forts reduced immediately after. Vedaji Bhaskar Pant who was in charge of Arni since the time of Shahaji, brought the keys of the Fort and tendered his services to Shivaji. Shivaji thereby confirmed the award of the Jagir of Arnee to him. After establishing Maratha Empire, the jagir of Arni and Venidurg were left to the son of Vedaji Bhaskar pant, out of respect for Vedaji Bhaskar Pant for his loyalty.

=== Treaty of 1762 ===
After the Battle of Arnee, a treaty was signed in 1762 between the Nawab of Arcot and Pratap Singh, Rajah of Tanjore. This was guaranteed by the Government of Fort St. George and confirmed by the East India Company. This once again restored and confirmed the Jagir to Thirumala I Rao Sahib under the 5th Article of the Treaty.

=== Extent of the Estate ===
The Arni jagir comprises 192 villages in the North Arcot district of Madras Presidency. Its extent was 211 square miles. The pant family ruled the region till 1948. The members of ruling family used 186 luxurious cars between 1920 and 1948, which were imported from various countries.

== Palaces and Architecture ==
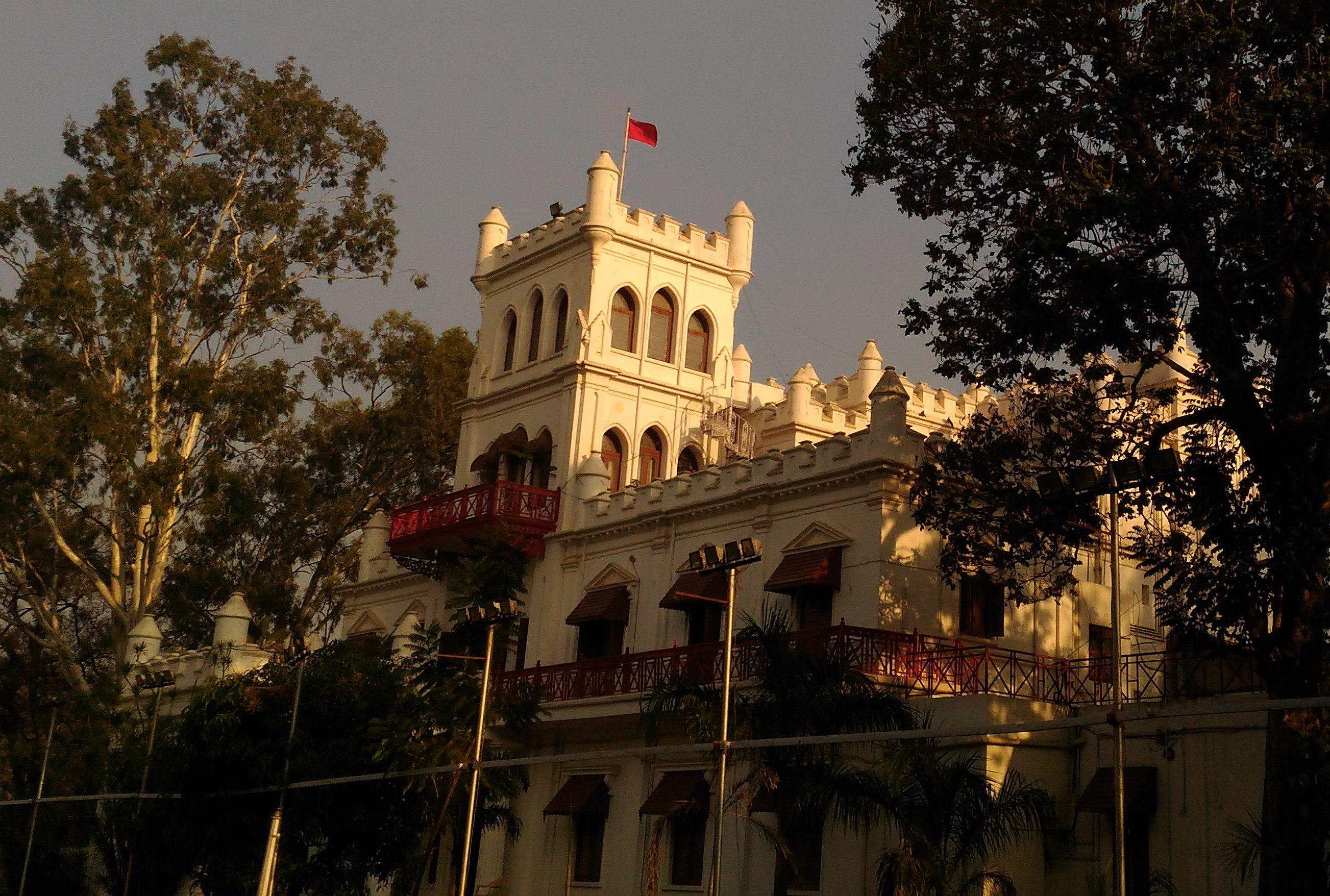
Arni House (now known as Jayamahal Palace/Jayamahal Palace hotel)

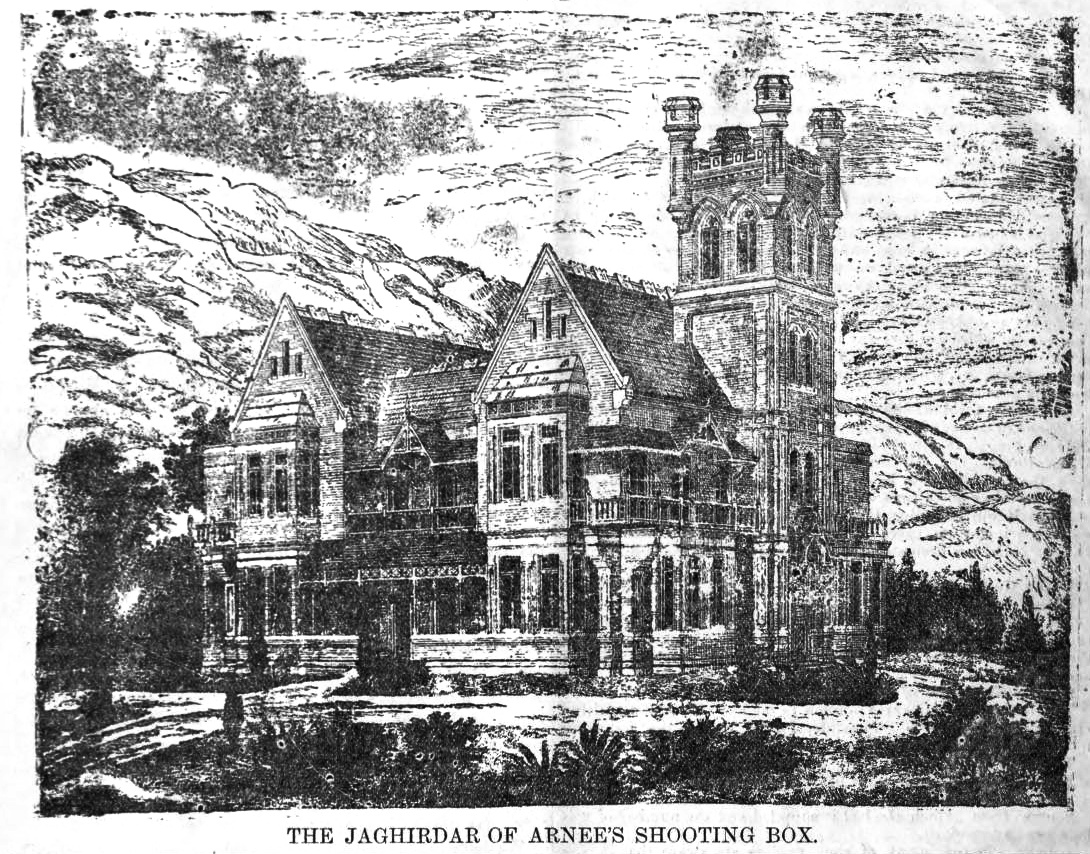
Portrait of Arni Jagirdar's Poosi Malai Kuppam Palace in 1887

In the town of Arni, which is the headquarters of the Arni jagir two palaces were built during 19 century.

=== Diwan Khane Palace ===
The first palace, is a two-storey building known as Diwan Khane, which was originally meant as a guest house for women and children of the royal family. It is spread over 35 acres, the palace had circular brick pillars, Indian motifs, arches, gothic columns and Madras terrace built with the lime and mortar method. Peacock pattern glass panels on the doors, door handles and engravings with flora and fauna — characteristic of the Mughal style of architecture — were also introduced. The palace had fish-typed door stoppers and floors that were made of lime but resembled tiled flooring. The last two features were unique to the architecture followed by Arni rulers of those times. At present, the palace is in ruins.

=== Maligai nagar ===
The second palace, known as Maligai Nagar, was built as a guest house for the rulers. It is a single-storey structure, which had separate loft for pigeons, four chimneys (despite the town experiencing generally hot climate). The palace is constructed in a typical British style. Most of the structure now remains intact but needs immediate conservation. In fact, Mr. Hariharan said, the forest palace was the earliest structure in the region to use steel rafters instead of traditional wooden rafters for its roof. Such steel rafters added strength to the structure.

=== Arni House ===
The Arni House was constructed by Jagirdars of Arni in 1903, which was later bought by Maharaja Krishnaraja Wadiyar IV and gifted to his nephew Jayachamarajendra Wadiyar and named it as The Jayamahal Palace. In 1949 Maharaja of Mysore Jayachamarajendra Wadiyar sold the palace to Maharaja of Gondal. The Jayamahal Palace was spread across 24 acres in Bangalore.

== Titles ==
- The Sultanate of Bijapur conferred upon Vedaji Baskar Pant the title of Rao Sahib, which subsequently replaced the surname Pant of the ruling family.
- In 1765, Srinivasa I Rao Sahib the 6th Jagirdar of Arni was granted the title "Raja". From their onwards the ruling family used the title "Raja".

== Rulers of Arni ==
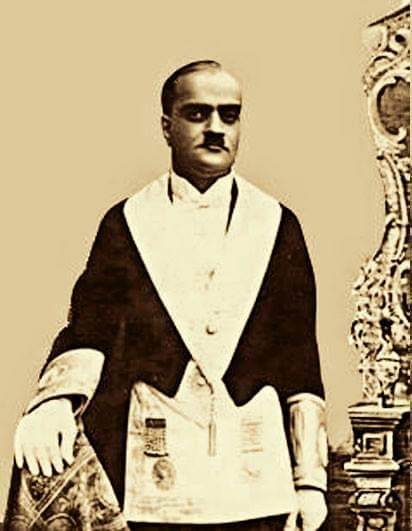
Raja Thirumala IV Rao Sahib

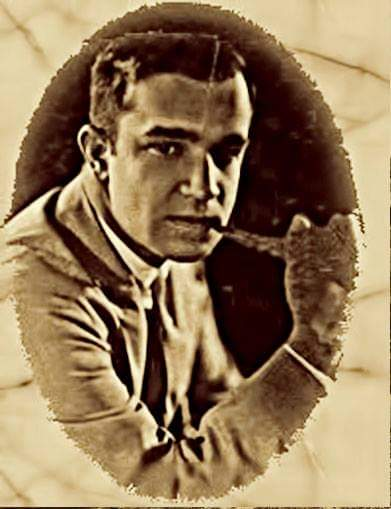
Raja Srinivasa IV Rao Sahib, last ruler of Arni in Arni Palace

In 1902, when the Jagirdar Raja Srinivasa III Rao Sahib died, Raja Thirumala IV Rao Sahib the next raja was a minor, and the estate was being continued under the management of the Court of Wards by Government's orders. After the death of Raja Thirumala IV Rao Sahib his eldest son Raja Srinivasa IV Rao Sahib succeeded, the estate.

The rulers of the Arni belonged to Marathi-Deshastha Madhva Brahmin family and were devout followers of Uttaradi Math. They used the titles Rao Sahib and Raja.

The rulers of Arni Jagir were:

- Vedaji Bhaskar Rao Pant – 1640 (founder)

=== Rao Sahib's ===
- Koneri Rao Sahib
- Ramachandra Rao Sahib – 1679
- Venkata I Rao Sahib
- Thirumala I Rao Sahib

=== Rajas ===
- Raja Srinivasa I Rao Sahib – (1765–1795)
- Raja Thirumala II Rao Sahib – (1795–1823)
- Raja Srinivasa II Rao Sahib – (1823–1853)
- Raja Thirumala III Rao Sahib – (1853–1871)
- Raja Srinivasa III Rao Sahib – (1871–1902)
- Raja Thirumala IV Rao Sahib – (1902–1931)
- Raja Srinivasa IV Rao Sahib – (1931–1948) – accession in 1948

== Abolition ==
The Jagir of Arnee was abolished under sections 41 (1) and 50 (7) of the Madras Estates (Abolition and Conversion into Ryotwari) Act, 1948 (as a result of the Zamindar Abolition Bill in 1948). The annual revenue of the Jagir at the time of abolition was around 2.5 lakhs.
