= Taj West End Bangalore =

Hotel in Bengaluru, India

Taj West End

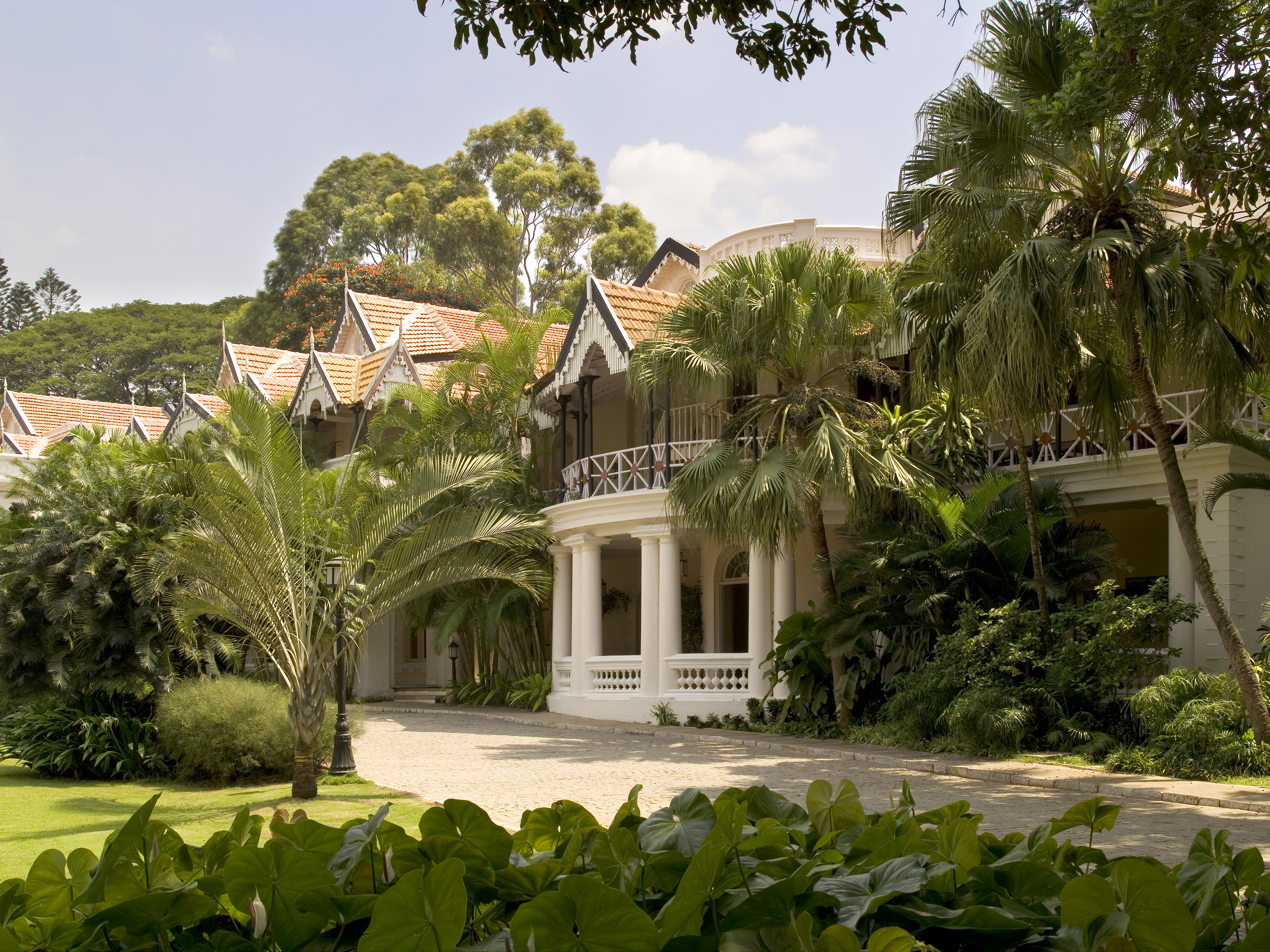
- Heritage Block, Taj West End
- Interactive map of the Taj West End area
- Hotel chain: Taj Hotels

General information
- Location: Bengaluru, India
- Coordinates: 12.98°N 77.58°E
- Opening: 1887
- Management: Taj Hotels

Other information
- Number of rooms: 117

Taj West End is a five-star heritage hotel in Bengaluru, India. Classified under the Taj Group's business hotels section, the 133-year-old hotel is considered the oldest hotel in the city.

== History ==
In 1887, a British woman named Mrs. Bronson started a boarding house with 10 beds. As the popularity of the first hotel in the city grew, it began to expand. In 1912, the place changed hands, with Spencer's buying it for a princely Rs.4,000. Decades later, in 1984, it was sold again, to the management of what is now the Taj West End.

== See also ==
- List of hotels in Bengaluru
- List of hotels in India
