= West Downs, Ooty =

Heritage hotel in Ooty, India

West Downs – The Heritage Resort
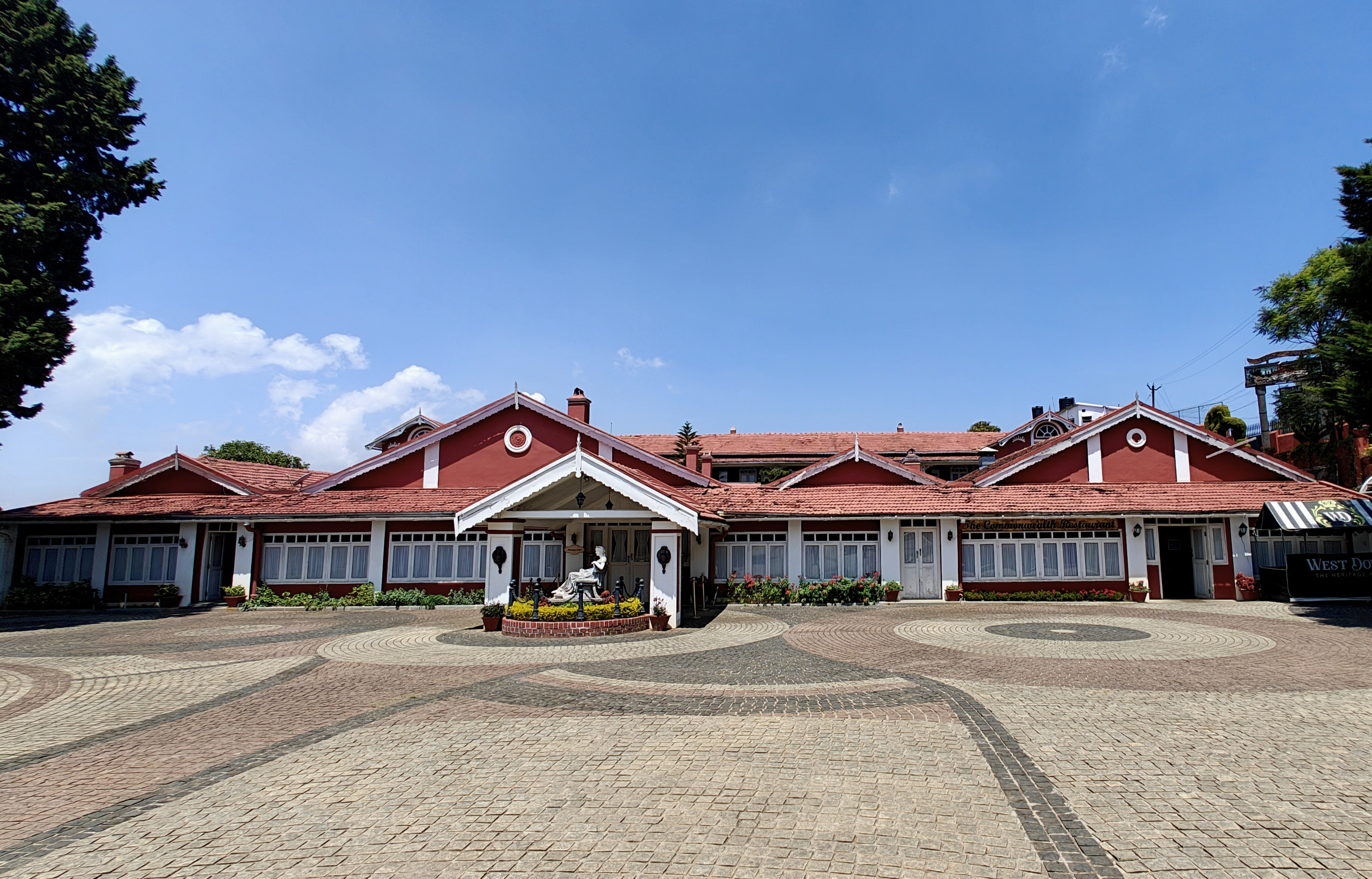
- West Downs property at 2025

- Location within Tamil Nadu

General information
- Location: Ooty (Udhagamandalam), Nilgiris district, Tamil Nadu, India, No. 100, Westbury Road, Ooty 643001
- Coordinates: 11.4137366°N 76.6881425°E

Website
- www.westdownsresort.com

West Downs – The Heritage Resort is a heritage hotel in Ooty (Udhagamandalam), Tamil Nadu, India. The property occupies a colonial-era bungalow historically known as Westdowns, which is listed in Frederick Price’s Ootacamund: A History (1908) under the “List of Houses in Ootacamund (1905)”.

== History ==
Frederick Price’s 1908 book Ootacamund: A History contains a tabulated “List of Houses in Ootacamund (1905)”, in which the house named Westdowns appears (entry no. 210), with the proprietor recorded as Mr. Joachim. According to the resort’s official history, the present owner purchased the property from the Commonwealth Trust Ltd. in 1991, retained the historic name “West Downs”, and adapted the site for use as a heritage hotel while preserving the original structure.

== Architecture ==
The building is described by the resort as a Victorian-era structure that has been modernised for hospitality use while maintaining its heritage character.

== Location ==
West Downs – The Heritage Resort is located at No. 100, Westbury Road, Ooty 643001, on the Coimbatore–Ooty–Gundlupet Highway corridor.

== See also ==
- Ooty
