= Hotel de l'Orient =

Hotel in India

Coordinates: 15.5561°N 73.7561°E

The Hotel de l’Orient is an 18th-century hotel in Puducherry, India. It was founded in 1664 by the Compagnie des Indes Orientales (French East India Company).

== Description ==
The mansion which houses the Hotel de l’Orient dates back to the late 1760s when Pondicherry was rebuilt.
