= Savoy Hotel, Mussoorie =

Hotel in Mussoorie, India

The Savoy
- Location within Uttarakhand

General information
- Location: The Mall, Mussoorie; Uttarakhand, India
- Coordinates: 30.4601°N 78.0617°E
- Opening: 1902
- Owner: Mr. Kishore Kaya

Design and construction
- Other designers: Fabinteriors

Other information
- Number of rooms: 75
- Number of restaurants: 2
- Parking: 200

The Savoy, is a historic luxury hotel in the hill station, Mussoorie, in Uttarakhand state of India, owned by Mr. Kishore Kaya and Managed by the ITC Hotels. Established in 1902, built in English Gothic architecture style mostly in wood, the hotel is spread over 11 acres (45,000 m^{2}) with 50 rooms at present, and overlooks the Himalayas. After the railway reached Dehradun in 1900, Mussoorie became more popular, and was the chief summer resort for European residents of the British Raj, from the plains of the United Provinces. Its bar, known as the 'Writer's Bar' remained famous for many decades after the independence of India in 1947.

At its height during the British Raj, according to a recent reviewer, "when the town itself was known as "the pleasure capital of the Raj", the Savoy Hotel was the place either to stay (if you could afford it) or to be seen (if you couldn't)".

Although the hotel gradually fell into disrepair and dwindling fortune after the 1960s, as newer hotels started flourishing in the town, and there were fewer Raj nostalgia travelers, it saw its fortunes revived after 2000 and it was bought by Mr. Kishore Kaya and managed by the ITC Hotels in 2009. Subsequently, the interiors of Savoy Mussoorie were designed by Fabinteriors in the year 2013 which gave it further recognition among modern travelers.

== History ==
The first hotel to be opened in Mussoorie was built in 1838.

Fanny Eden, sister of then Governor-General, Lord Auckland, wrote in her journal of 17 March 1838:

"There is a large hotel just built on a hill here, and slate billiard tables in it. It is impossible in this book to attempt a sketch of the mountains but if you were to see where we are and upon what we are looking down, you would wonder how hotels and slate billiard tables get here. All the materials for building them are brought from the plain." (From Tigers, Durbars and Kings; Fanny Eden's Indian Journals, transcribed and edited by Janet Dunbar, John Murray, London 1988).

The "Charles Ville" hotel was built in 1861. Cecil D. Lincoln, the Irishman who was a barrister in Lucknow, acquired the estate of "Rev. Maddock’s Mussoorie School" around 1895. He built the Savoy during the next five years, after razing the school to ground. As the road up from Dehradun was not ready as of then, a massive amount of Edwardian furniture, grand pianos, billiard-tables, barrels of cider, crates of champagne and other materials were all carried uphill by bullock cart; this also included the oak pieces that were later joined to make its dining hall floor that i The Cecil at Simla and The Carlton at Lucknow.

It soon became popular amongst the British upper echelons of the Raj, such as the civil servants and military officers who wanted to avoid the stiff official environment of Simla, the summer capital. It became the 'pleasure capital' of the Raj. In March 1906, the Princess of Wales (later Queen Mary) stayed here and attended a garden party on the Savoy grounds, the place is known as the Beer Garden. Soon after her departure, the town was hit by an earthquake, and many buildings were flattened, the hotel also experienced some damage and was closed temporarily, though it was reopened in 1907 after repairs. Electricity reached Mussoorie in 1909, adding to the convenience of its hotels.

After World War I, the first car came to the hill station in 1920, and the hotel entered its most popular phase, as it boasted a large imperial dining room and the ballroom which was the talk of the town in its hey day. Maharajas and chieftains from the plains below stayed here and several maintained suites here, wealthy princes occupied entire wings with their retinues, as did various Kings of Nepal, Haile Selassie, Emperor of Ethiopia, the Crown Prince of Laos, and Nobel Prize winner Pearl S. Buck. The first-floor of the Public Library nearby, served as the Savoy Restaurant for many years. The Savoy orchestra played each night at the ballroom, filled with couples doing fox-trot, the latest dancing craze in those days. Visiting Mussoorie in 1926, the famous traveler, Lowell Thomas, wrote, "There is a hotel in Mussoorie (Savoy), where they ring a bell just before dawn so that the pious may say their prayers and the impious get back to their own beds."

Over the years it has been visited by several dignitaries including Jawahar Lal Nehru, on several occasions, notably in May 1920, when he stayed here with his ailing mother, wife and his infant daughter, Indira; incidentally Afghan envoys who were negotiating a peace deal with the British at the time, after the recent war were also staying at the hotel. Later as Prime Minister of India in 1959, he addressed the Travel Agents Association of India, at the hotel. After independence, the Dalai Lama gave a public audience every Thursday, at the hotel during his temporary residence at Mussoorie following his exile from Tibet, in 1959.

At one point it was run by the Italian hoteliers, Messrs Viglietta and Palazzi, who also ran the Carlton at Lucknow, and later leased the Majestic Hotel in Bombay. After that it changed hands many time, first taken over by Kripa Ram Jauhar in 1946, followed by his son Anand Kumar Jauhar in the 1960s, it changed hands again in 2005 when it went to R P Singh, a Kanpur-based industrialist. In July 2009, it was acquired by India's second largest hotel chain, ITC Hotels's wholly owned subsidiary Fortune Hotels from Hotels Control Pvt Ltd, its previous owners. Most recently, the hotel was under restoration, by the famed Interior Designer Sarbjit Singh of Fab Interiors, and 50 rooms were expected to be operational by the end of 2010, along with the Writer's Bar, a restaurant and banqueting facilities.

In April 2001, the hotel hosted its first writer's retreat, followed by another one in 2002, which included writers, academics, film-makers and people from other walks of life.

== Transport ==
Savoy Hotel is around 32 km from the nearest railhead, Dehradun Railway Station and 55 km from Jolly Grant Airport. Mussoorie Bus Station is the nearest bus terminal.
