= The Oberoi, Gurgaon =

Luxury hotel in Gurgaon, India

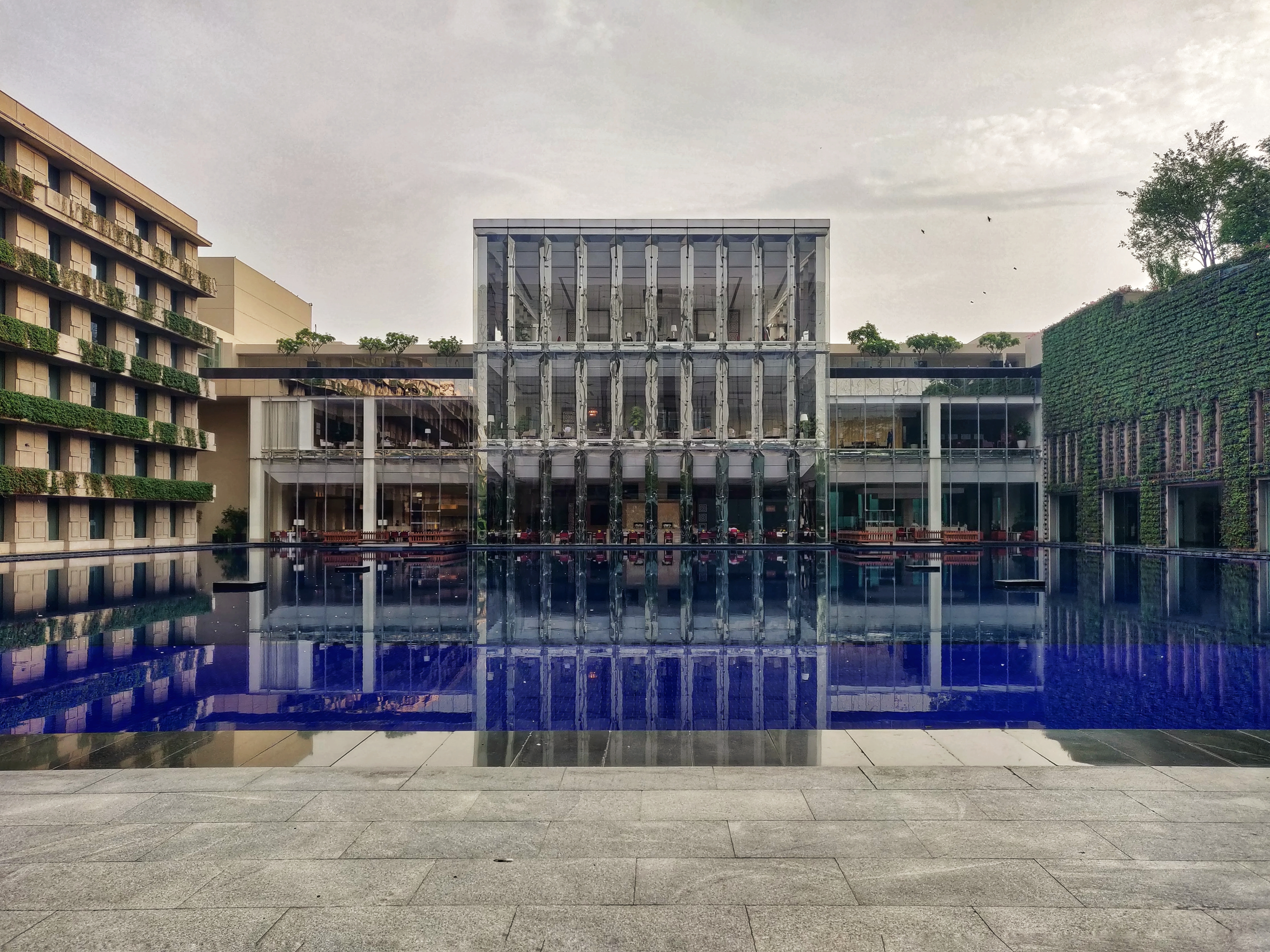
- The Oberoi, Gurgaon
- Interactive map of the The Oberoi, Gurgaon area
- Hotel chain: Oberoi Hotels & Resorts

General information
- Location: Gurgaon, 443 Udyog Vihar, Phase V, Gurgaon, Haryana 122,016
- Coordinates: 28.50217°N 77.088228°E
- Opening: 12 April 2011
- Cost: ₹4 billion (US$42 million)
- Owner: Orbit Resorts
- Operator: Oberoi Hotels & Resorts

Height
- Height: 21m

Technical details
- Floor count: 6
- Floor area: 60,000m2

Design and construction
- Architect: RSP Architects Planners & Engineers

Other information
- Number of rooms: 202
- Number of suites: 15
- Number of restaurants: 2

Website
- The Oberoi, Gurgaon's official website

The Oberoi, Gurgaon is a luxury hotel located 15 minutes from New Delhi’s Indira Gandhi International Airport, a short walk from DLF Cyber City and 30 minutes by car from central Delhi. It opened in 2011, and is owned by Orbit Hotels and managed by The Oberoi Group.

In January 2012, it became the first Indian luxury hotel to be named, "the World's Leading Luxury Hotel for 2011", at the annual 'World Travel Awards'. Previously in December 2011, CNNGo named it amongst, "11 Indian hotels to visit in 2012".

The hotel spans 36,422 square metres and features a 930 square metre green wall that contains around 3,000 potted plants.

The hotel restaurants include the 24-hour multi-cuisine threesixtyone° and Amaranta which serves speciality coastal Indian cuisine. The property also has a bar termed as 'The Piano Bar', a cigar lounge and a spa.

== Design and construction ==
The hotel's architect, RSP Design, described their concept as a "serene haven amidst towering skyscrapers".

The hotel features contemporary design, with a glass and silver geometric jewel box design that houses the hotel’s fifth floor lobby, as well as the restaurants and hospitality areas.

== Facilities and services ==
=== Accommodation ===
The Oberoi, Gurgaon has 202 rooms and suites.

Deluxe Rooms: 55 keys, 58 square metres, cityscape views. Luxury Rooms: 39 keys, 58 square metres, maze garden views.

Premier Rooms: 93 keys, 58 square metres, swimming pool and reflection pool views.

Deluxe Suites: 8 keys, 115 square metres, swimming pool and reflection pool views.

Luxury Suites: 3 keys, 173 square metres, reflection pool views.

Residential Suite: 1 key, 296 square metres, cityscape views.

Residential Suites with a Private Pool: 2 keys, 384 square metres, cityscape views.

Presidential Suite: 1 key, 493 square metres, cityscape and pool views.

=== The Oberoi Spa ===
The Oberoi Spa has private therapy rooms for Oberoi spa experiences, massage, body treatments, facials and Indian treatments. It is open from 10:00 am to midnight, for the exclusive use of resident guests.

There is also a 55-metre-long, temperature-controlled swimming pool, a 15-metre shallow splash pool for children and a 24 hour fitness centre.

=== Restaurants ===
The Oberoi, Gurgaon has two restaurants, a lounge bar and a patisserie. The hotel also offers home delivery to addresses up to 25 kilometres away.

ZIYA has 46 covers. The restaurant serves pan-Indian cuisines designed by Michelin-starred Mentor Chef Vineet Bhatia MBE. ZIYA is open for dinner seven days a week, and for lunch on Friday to Sunday.

threesixtyone° has 206 covers (166 indoors and 40 on the al fresco wooden deck). It serves Japanese, Chinese, Italian and Indian cuisines prepared by Oberoi chefs in show kitchens. The restaurant is open from 7:00 am to 12:30 am, seven days a week. Private dining experiences on the al fresco deck are available with advance notice.

Madam Chow has 86 covers and a private dining room for up to 12 guests. It serves Chinese cuisines for lunch and dinner.

The Piano Bar and Cigar Lounge has 54 covers. The bar serves cocktails, single malts, international fine wines and hand rolled Cuban cigars accompanied by live piano music. It also has private humidor lockers for guests to store their cigars. The Piano Bar and Cigar Lounge is open from 7:00 am to 12:30 am, seven days a week.

The Oberoi Patisserie has 12 covers. It offers gourmet sweet and savoury goods, imported meats and cheeses, condiments and more. These can be gift wrapped in hampers, taken away or enjoyed onsite. The Oberoi Patisserie is open from 10.00 am to 8.00 pm.

The hotel also offers 24-hour in-room dining served by a personal butler trained by the UK Guild of English Butlers.

=== Meetings and Events ===
The Oberoi, Gurgaon can cater for engagement and birthday parties, wedding anniversaries, art shows, car launches, award ceremonies, fashion shows, cocktail receptions and more. It has private entrances, indoor and al fresco venues for up to 600 people.

There is also a business centre with four meeting rooms and one board room.

=== Grand Ballroom ===
Has separate guest and service entrances, a pre-function area for food service and views of the water body. Can be divided into three separate venues. Maximum capacity: 600 guests.

=== Ballroom ===
Can be used as one large hall, or two smaller, soundproof venues. Features include a 6-metre-high ceiling and state-of-the-art lighting. Both halls can be accessed via the private driveway and lift. Maximum capacity: 250 people.

=== Business Centre ===
Has two six-seater meeting rooms, two eight-seater meeting rooms and a board room for up to sixteen. All rooms have modern technology, large windows and water body views.

The Oberoi, Gurgaon also has an art gallery, a salon and a luxury shopping arcade, with stores including Gucci.

=== Oberoi Experiences ===
The hotel offers guided walking and rickshaw tours of Old and New Delhi, chocolate making classes, private dining on the wooden deck at threesixtyone° and private yoga sessions.

== Awards ==
Editor’s Choice Award for Best Emerging Restaurant (ZIYA), Travel + Leisure, India’s Delicious Dining Awards (2024).

Favourite Indian Business Hotel, Condé Nast Traveller, India, Readers' Travel Awards (2017).

Favourite Indian Business Hotel, Condé Nast Traveller, India, Readers' Travel Awards (2016).

Top 10 City Hotels in Asia (Ranked 4th), Travel + Leisure, USA, World’s Best Awards, Readers’ Survey (2016).

Best Modern Indian in a Hotel - Fine Dine in Gurgaon: amaranta, Eazydiner Foodie Awards (2016).

Best Confectionery in Gurgaon: The Oberoi Patisserie & Delicatessen, Times Food Guide Awards (2015).

Best Overseas Business Hotel (Ranked 3rd), Condé Nast Traveller, UK, Readers' Travel Awards (2014).
