= Ronil Royale =

Coordinates: 15.5561°N 73.7561°E

The Ronil Royale Hotel, opened circa 1987, is located in North Goa, India, and consists of twenty-four rooms. Its name is a portmanteau of Robustiano do Rosario Barreto (RO) and Nilda Souza Xavier Barreto (NIL). There are five partners of the hotel including Donna Nilda, (born 1918–19). As of 2011, the hotel ownership remains with the immediate family of the Barretos, with the youngest of the sons, Advocate Cipriano Barreto, running the hotel as a managing director for the family, with Sanil Costa Frais being the general manager. It is one of the first Goan style hotels in Calangute Baga.

== Hotel Facilities ==
The hotel's restaurant, Casa de Jantar, offers seafood, tandoori-grilled food, and vegetarian food. The hotel has banquet halls and a swimming pool. Its services include room service, laundry service, safe deposit boxes, a doctor on call, taxi services, ISD and STD, and currency exchange services.
