= Radisson Blu Hotel Chennai =

Luxury hotel in Chennai, India

Radisson Blu Hotel GRT Chennai
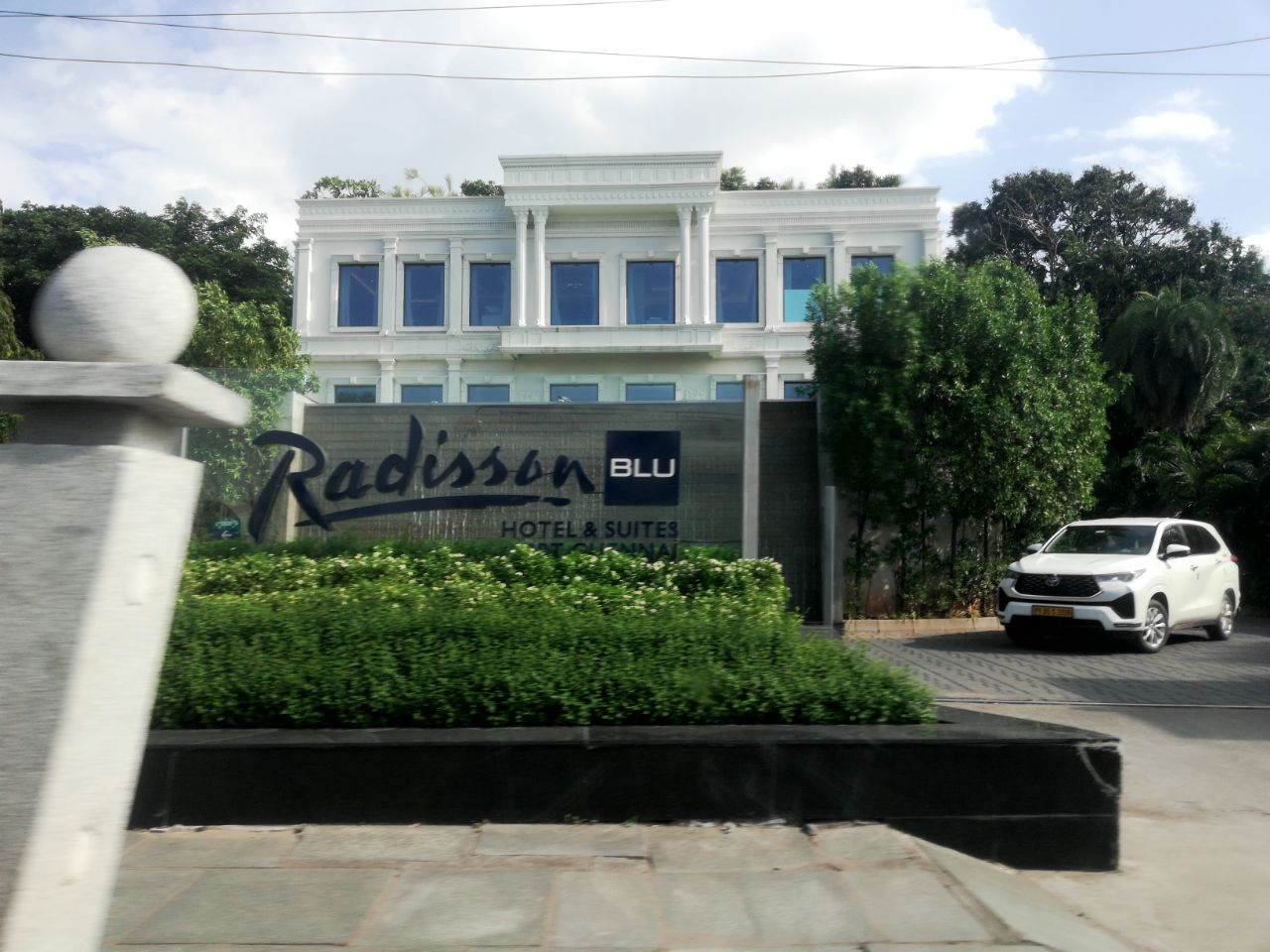
- Entrance of Radisson Blu Chennai
- Hotel chain: Carlson Rezidor Hotel Group

General information
- Location: Chennai, India, 531, GST Road, Saint Thomas Mount; Chennai, Tamil Nadu 600 016
- Coordinates: 12.99437°N 80.187551°E
- Opening: 1 March 1999
- Owner: GRT Hotels and Resorts Private Limited
- Operator: Radisson BLU

Technical details
- Floor area: 2

Other information
- Number of rooms: 101
- Number of suites: 7
- Number of restaurants: 3
- Parking: Yes

Radisson Blu is a five-star hotel in Chennai, India. It is located on GST Road at Meenambakkam.

== History ==
The hotel was built by Macnur Hospitality Limited, 75 percent of whose equity is held by the M A Chidambaram group, in March 1999 at a cost of ₹ 340 million. In 2001, the hotel was renamed as Radisson GRT after it was bought by the city-based GR Thanga Maaligai.

== The hotel ==
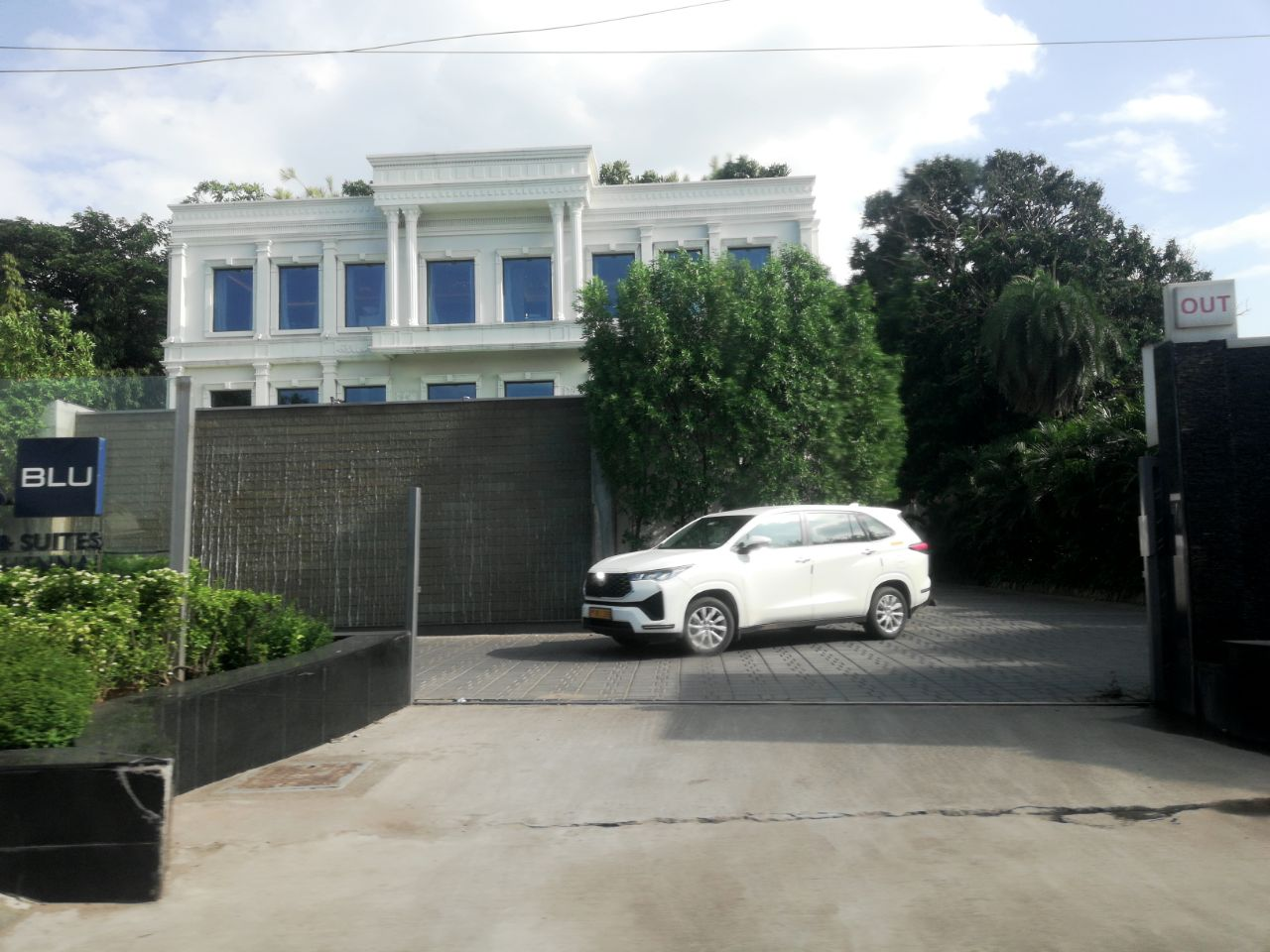
The hotel as in October 2025

The hotel has 101 rooms including 7 suites, 19 business-class rooms, 24 club rooms and 51 "deluxe rooms".

The hotel initially planned to add another 30 rooms by constructing on the land acquired adjacent to the existing hotel.

== See also ==
- Hotels in Chennai
- Radisson Blu City Centre Chennai
