= Bissau Palace Hotel, Jaipur =

Building in Rajasthan, India

Coordinates: 26°55′47″N 75°48′28″E

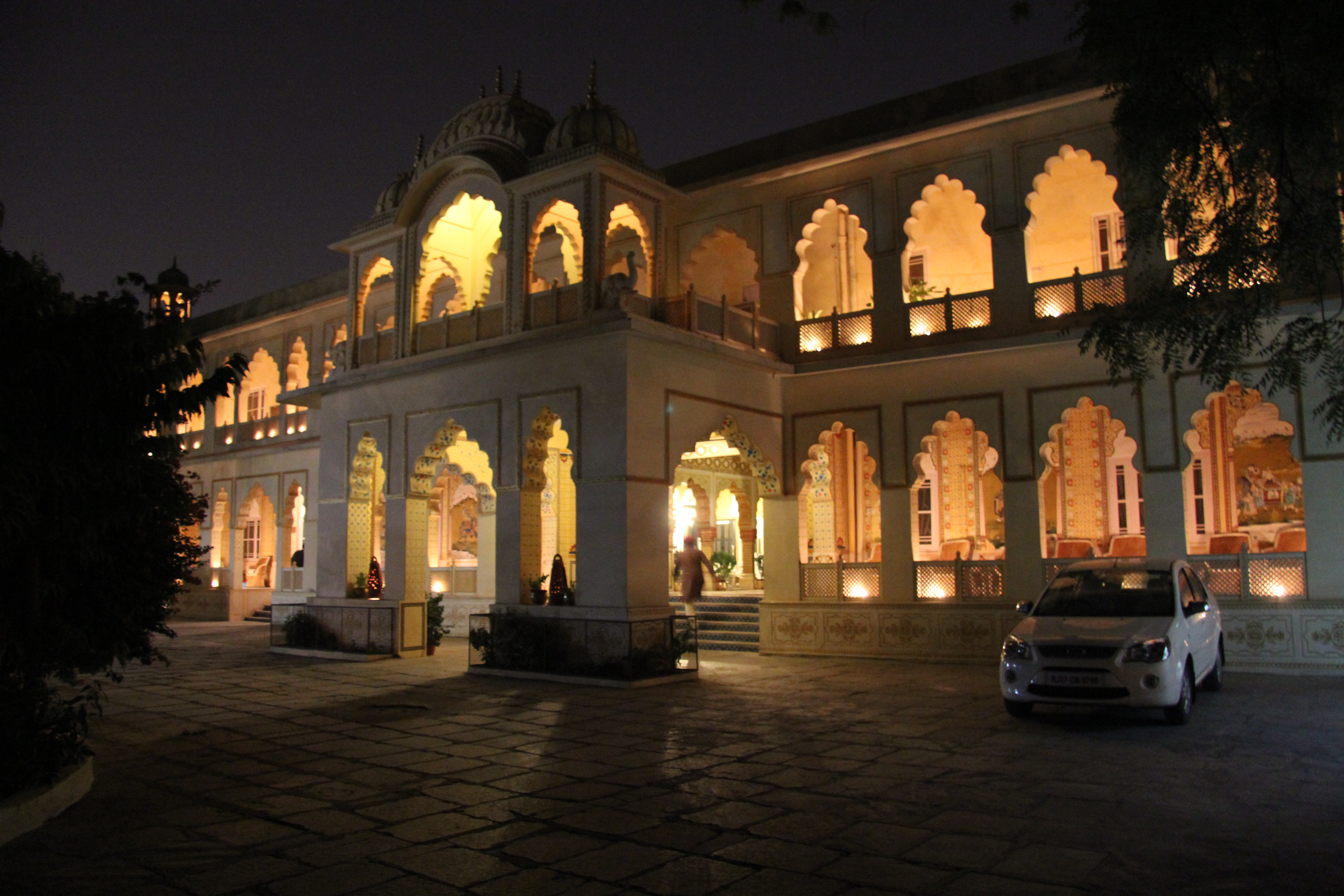
- Bissau Palace Hotel in Jaipur
- Interactive map of the Bissau Palace Hotel, Jaipur area

General information
- Location: Jaipur, Rajasthan, India

Other information
- Number of suites: 36
- Number of restaurants: 2
- Parking: Yes

The Bissau Palace Hotel, Jaipur is a heritage hotel in Jaipur, in India. Built in the 19th century, it was the palace of Raghubir Singhji, a royal nobleman. It is located just outside the walls of the old city of Jaipur, a short distance to the north of Chand Pol (an entrance gate to the old city). It is situated 1 kilometre (0.62 mi) northeast of the downtown area.

== History ==
Built in the 19th century during the reign of Maharaja Sawai Jagat Singh (1803–18), the structure originally served as a palace of the nobleman Rawal Raja Raghubir Singhji. The Shekhawati estate was home to the rawals of Bissau. The palace was converted to a hotel in 1965. Now a heritage hotel, it is situated in Jaipur's old bazaar area.

== Architecture and fittings ==
Bissau Palace Hotel has a curved entry facade, and the enclosed area within the palace displays checkerboard patterned flooring, while the lounge has wooden floors. There are 36 rooms, some of which have unique bed fittings and ornamentation, including antique furnishings and artifacts. Over the fireplace in the palace hangs a painting of the Maharaja of Bissau with his courtiers. Also seen on the walls of the palace are swords that were used during encounters with Muslims. Next to the sitting room is a wood-paneled library filled with old books. Along with exhibits of typical artifacts of Rajasthan, there are many showcases containing jewelry, weapons, sculptures of elephants, vases, and photographs – including a tiger shikar scene and Lord Mountbatten visiting the royal family of Bissau. The hotel has three restaurants, including one on the rooftop, and presents Rajasthani folk dancers during buffet dinners.

== Grounds ==
Bissau Palace Hotel is reached via a circular entry way. A well-tended garden, housed with many species of birds, is part of the grounds. Among the other facilities are a swimming pool and tennis courts.

== Bibliography ==
- Bernard, Trisha (1 August 2008). With the Kama Sutra Under My Arm: My Madcap Misadventures Across India. Sterling Publishing Company, Inc. ISBN 978-1-4027-5712-9.
- Bhatt, Shankarlal C. (2006). Land and People of Indian States and Union Territories: In 36 Volumes. Rajasthan. Gyan Publishing House. ISBN 978-81-7835-379-1.
- Bentley, Cheryl (1 February 2011). A Guide to the Palace Hotels of India. Hunter Publishing, Inc. ISBN 978-1-58843-970-3.
- Horton, Patrick; Finlay, Hugh; Plunkett, Richard (2002). Delhi. Lonely Planet. ISBN 978-1-86450-297-8.
- Martinelli, Antonio; Michell, George; Nath, Aman (1 March 2005). Palaces of Rajasthan. Frances Lincoln. ISBN 9780711225053.
- Page, Mary (April 2013). The Grand New Delhi Escapade. Strategic Book Publishing. ISBN 978-1-62516-020-1.
- Raina, A. K.; Agarwal, Dr. S. K. (1 January 2004). The Essence of Tourism Development: Dynamics, Philosophy, and Strategies. Sarup & Sons. ISBN 978-81-7625-527-1.
