= Fort Madhogarh =

Fort in Madhogarh

Coordinates: 28.618738°N 77.230577°E

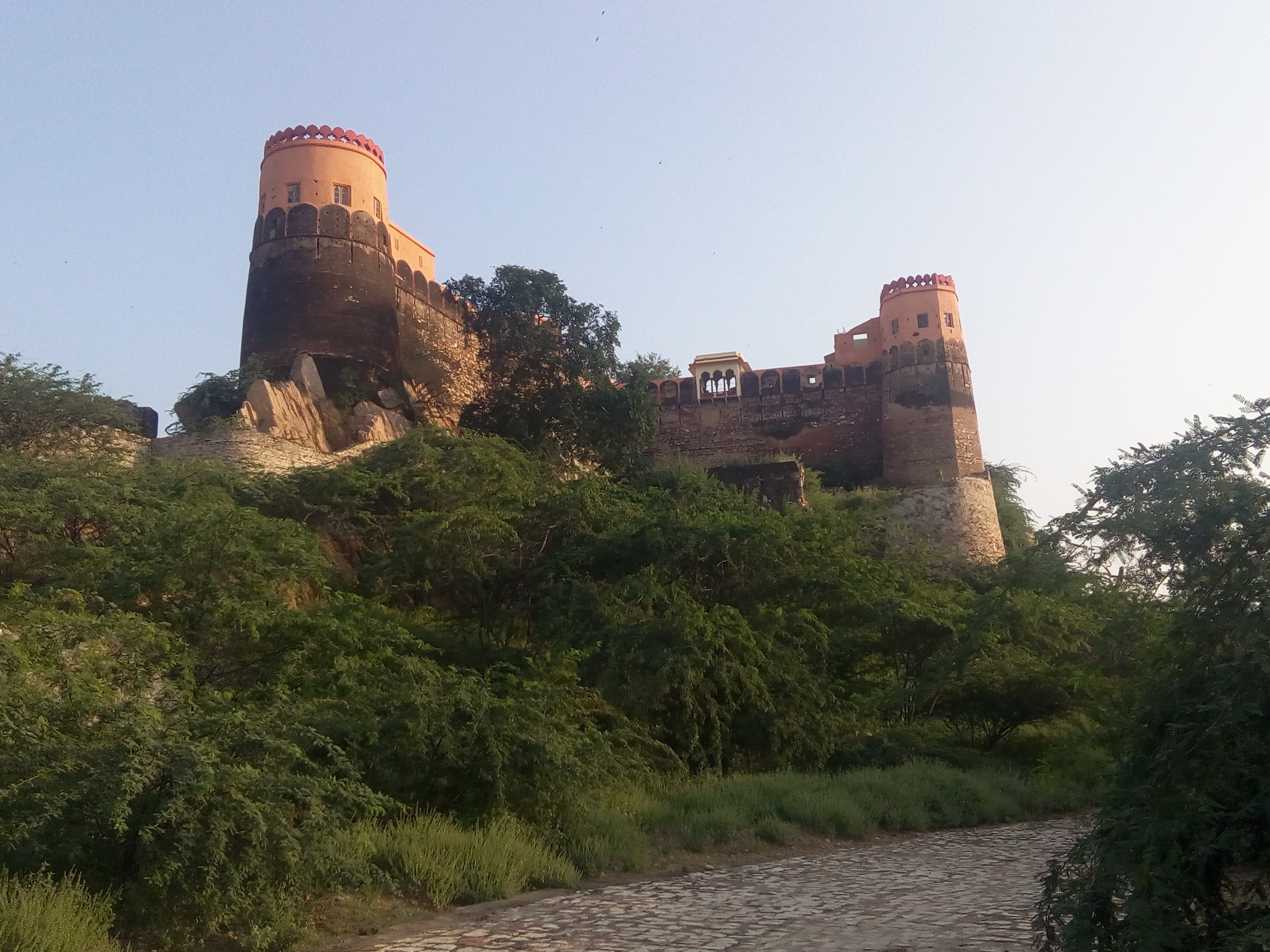
Fort Madhogarh

Fort Madhogarh a historic fort located in Madhogarh Village, 42 km from Jaipur, off the Jaipur - Agra highway (NH 11). It was built by Madho Singh of the Kachhwaha Rajput clan and later granted as a hereditary estate to Thakur Pratap Singh of the Bhati clan by Maharaja Sawai Ram Singh II. The fort is historically linked to the 1787 Battle of Tunga and was converted into a heritage hotel by the descendants of Thakur Bhawani Singh in 2000. Known for its Rajput architecture and panoramic views of the surrounding countryside, it now offers restored suites and hospitality services.

== History ==
Fort Madhogarh is around 400 years old. It was built by Madho Singh of the Kachhwaha Rajput clan. The Madhogarh Fort was given to Thakur Pratap Singh of the Bhati clan as a hereditary estate by Maharaja Sawai Ram Singh II, after his marriage into the Madhogarh family. In 2000, it was converted into a heritage hotel by the family of Thakur Bhawani Singh. The fort was involved in the 1787 Battle of Tunga, fought between Maharaja Sawai Pratap Singh of Jaipur and Mahadaji Scindia of the Marathas. The fort overlooks the Tunga battlefield and a Rajasthani village inhabited by communities of artisans.

== Architecture ==
Fort Madhogarh fearures arched stone lintels, and narrow gun‑loops are set into the walls for defense. A U‑shaped layout encloses a central courtyard, around which the Pratap Mahal suite and the Deodhi Phoola Mahal are arranged. Fort Madhogarh today offers 51 rooms and suites, including hill-facing chambers within the old fort and pavilion suites in newly built wings.
