= Radisson Blu City Centre =

Luxury hotel in Chennai, India

Radisson Blu City Centre Chennai
- Interactive map of the Radisson Blu City Centre Chennai area
- Hotel chain: Radisson Hotels

General information
- Location: India, 2 Ethiraj Salai, Egmore; Chennai, Tamil Nadu
- Coordinates: 13.067044°N 80.255738°E
- Opening: 3 March 2012
- Owner: VVT Hotels Pvt Ltd
- Operator: Carlson Rezidor Hotel Group

Technical details
- Floor count: 12

Other information
- Number of rooms: 162
- Number of suites: 14

Website
- radissonblu.com

Radisson Blu City Centre Chennai is a 12-storied five-star hotel located in Egmore, Chennai, India. It is the second Radisson Blu hotel in the city after the Radisson Blu Chennai hotel near Chennai airport.

== The hotel ==
The hotel has 162 rooms including 14 suites. It has 9,700 square feet of conference and meeting space that can accommodate up to 800 people. The hotel also has a business centre. Recreational facilities at the hotel include a spa called Chakra by Thai Sabai, a gymnasium, an outdoor swimming pool (which is closed) and a discothèque. There are four food-and-beverage outlets at the hotel, including a 24-hour coffee shop, a large bar with a separate cigar lounge, Radisson's signature restaurant The Great Kebab Factory and specialty coastal Japanese cuisine restaurant Raku Raku.

The hotel is designed by interior designer Vikram Phadke.

== See also ==
- Hotels in Chennai
- Radisson Blu Hotel Chennai
- List of tallest buildings in Chennai
