= Fernhills Palace =

Palace and hotel in Ooty, Tamil Nadu, India

Coordinates: 11.3970473°N 76.6835775°E

Fernhill Palace
- Interactive map of the Fernhill Palace area
- Former names: Fernhills bungalow, Moonesami

General information
- Status: Completed
- Architectural style: Swiss Chalet style
- Location: Ooty, Tamil Nadu, India
- Year built: 1851
- Completed: 1851
- Owner: Maharaja of Mysore (historical)
- Operator: WelcomHeritage Hotels Group

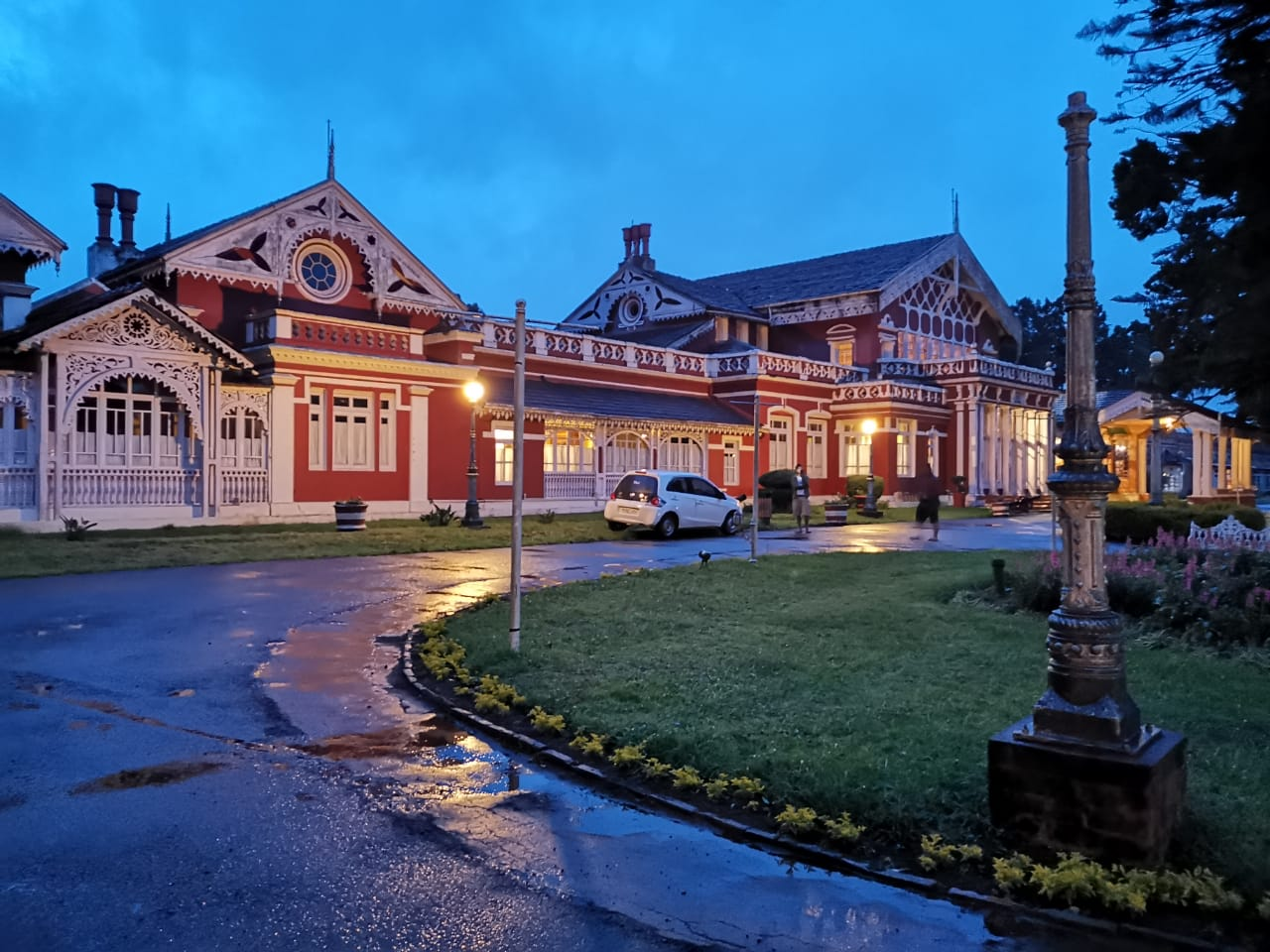
Fernhills Palace

Fernhill Palace was the erstwhile summer residence of the Maharaja of Mysore. The first Fernhills bungalow was built in 1851 as a private residence in the hill station Ooty in the Indian state of Tamil Nadu. In the 1990s, Fernhill Palace became a heritage hotel and today it is considered a luxury resort, attracting visitors from around the world. The palace resembles a Swiss Chalet with its carved wooden bargeboards and ornamental cast iron. The palace grounds with its manicured gardens, firs and cedars accentuate the alpine look of the place. There is a church-like indoor badminton court on the grounds.

== History ==
The first Fernhills bungalow was built in 1851 by Capt. F. Cotton. It changed hands over some time till mid-1860 when it was temporarily named Moonesami and served as one of Ooty's earliest country clubs. During the time of the British Raj, the English elite would flee the hot and muggy plains of the Madras Presidency and take sanctuary in the cool climes of Ooty, with its expanses of hills and terraced tea gardens. Its popularity never waned and has grown to include holidaymakers, honeymooners, film units and boarding schools.

The palace was converted into a luxury hotel by Srikantadatta Narasimharaja Wadiyar.

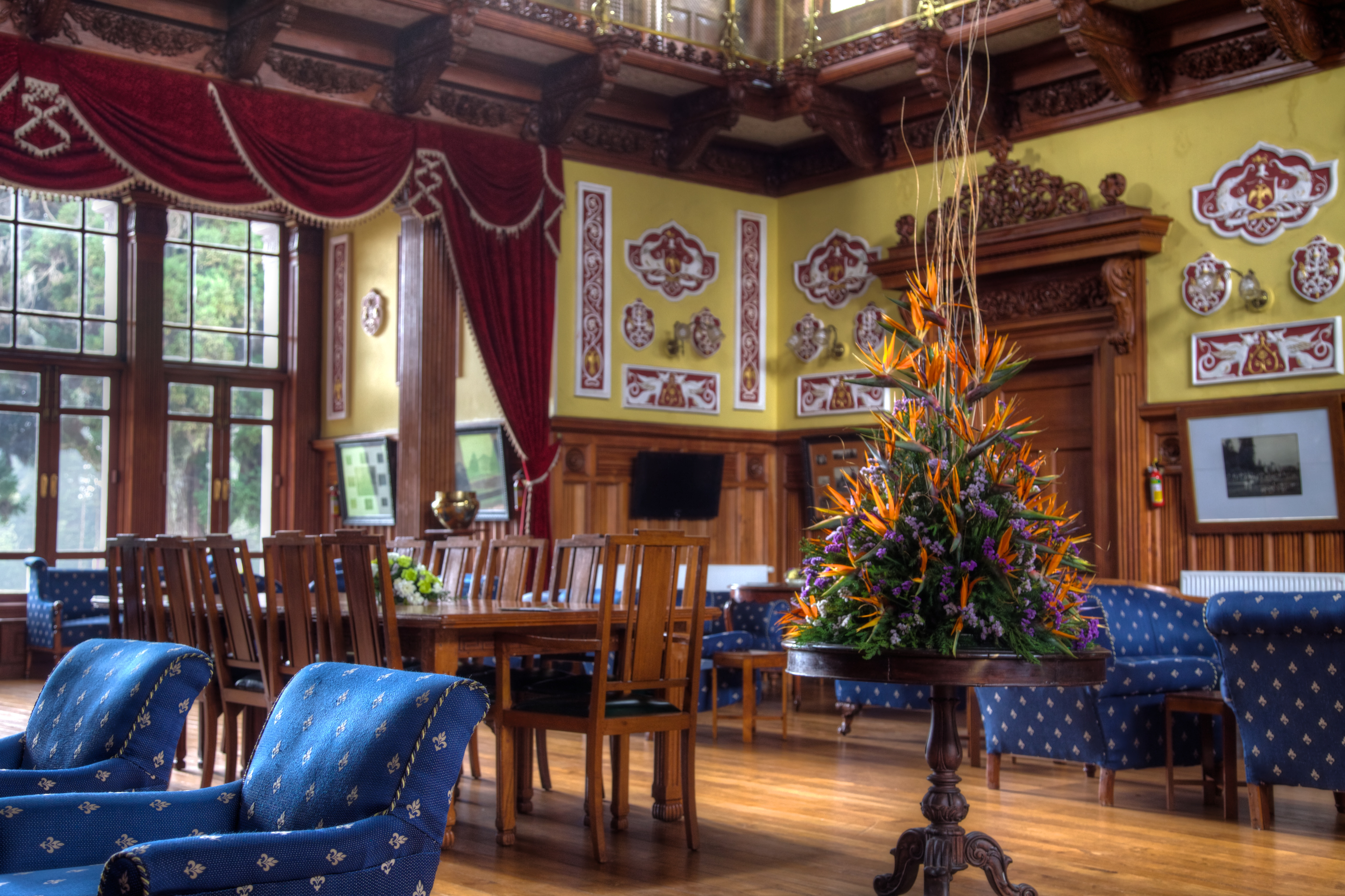
Dining room of the Fernhills Palace Hotel in Ooty

Today it is a heritage hotel run by the WelcomHeritage Hotels Group. The luxury resort includes the Curry & Rice restaurant serving Anglo-Indian cuisine, a library, wedding hall and lawn, and board room.

== Description ==
The Palace is spread out over 50 acres (200,000 m^{2}) of lawns, gardens, and dense woods. It is situated in the Nilgiri Hills, fringed by cardamom and tea plantations and eucalyptus forests. It has been described in the New Indian Express newspaper as having a 'British colonial vibe.'
