= Jayamahal Palace Hotel =

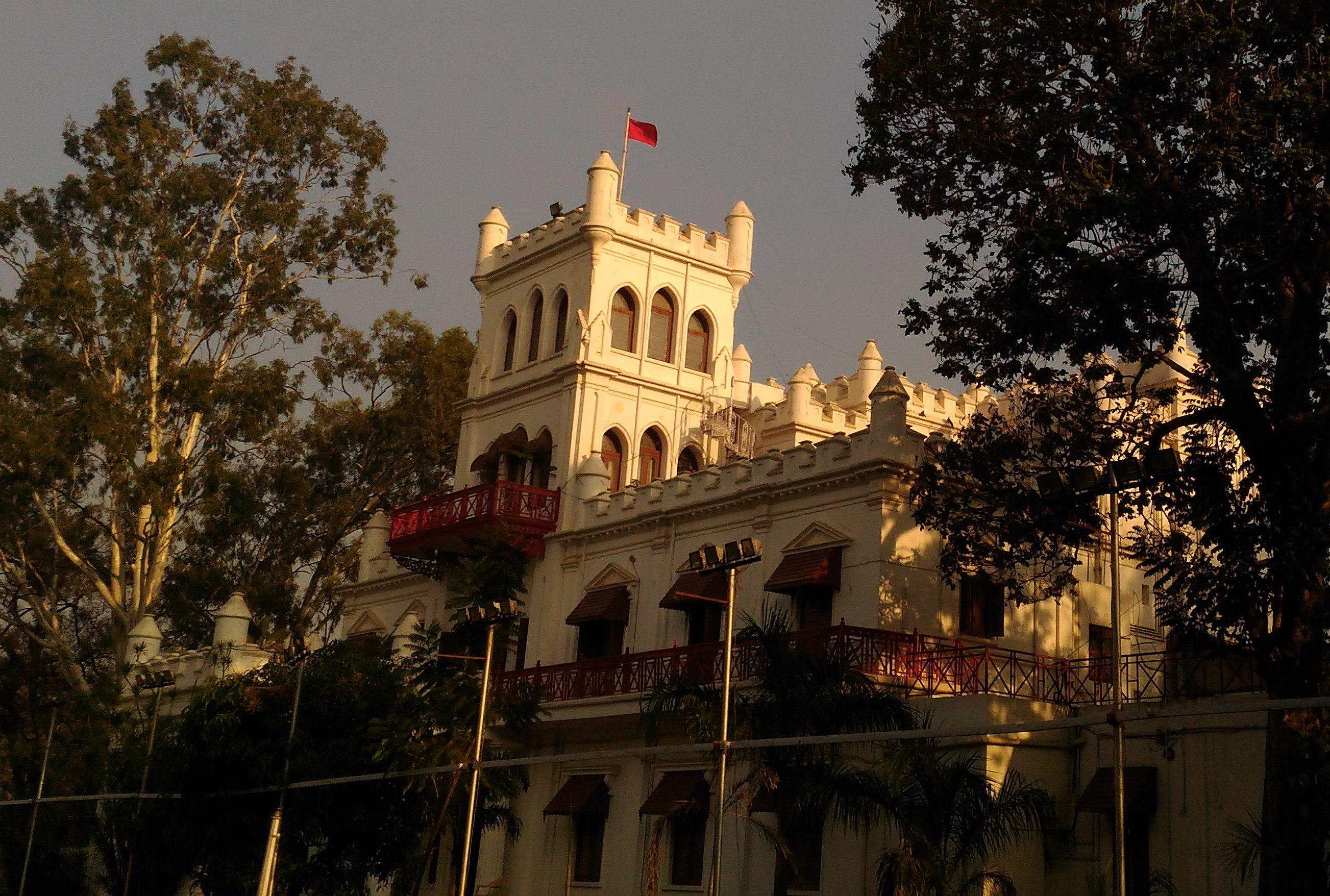
- View of the main palace of Jayamahal Palace Hotel

General information
- Location: India, Bangalore; Jayamahal Road, Bangalore, 560 046
- Coordinates: 12.9970°N 77.5974°E
- Opening: 22 May 2005

Technical details
- Floor area: 19 acres of land

Design and construction
- Architects: HH Maharaja Shri Jyotendrasinhji Vikramsinhji Sahib, the present `Thakore Saheb' of Gondal State

Other information
- Number of rooms: 37
- Number of suites: 11
- Number of restaurants: 2

Website
- Official Website

Jayamahal Palace was earlier known as Arni Hall and originally owned by the Jagirdar of Arni in Tamil Nadu around 1892. Jayamahal Palace Hotel is a 4-star heritage luxury hotel.
