= List of golf courses in India =

The following is list of golf courses in India.

Name	City	State	Established	Notes
Bombay Presidency Golf Club	Mumbai	Maharashtra	1927	
Chandigarh Golf Club	Chandigarh	Chandigarh	1962	
CIAL Golf and Country Club	Kochi	Kerala	2010	
Coimbatore Golf Club	Coimbatore	Tamil Nadu	1985	
Cosmopolitan Club	Chennai	Tamil Nadu	1985	
Clover Greens	Bengaluru	Karnataka		
Delhi Golf Club	Delhi	New Delhi	1948	
Digboi Golf Links	Digboi	Assam	1888	
DLF Golf and Country Club	Gurgaon	Haryana	2010	
Eagleton	Bengaluru	Karnataka		
East Point Golf Club	Visakhapatnam	Andhra Pradesh	1884	
Godavari Golf Club (GGC) Godavari Oil & Natural Gas Corporation Golf Club	Rajamahendravaram	Andhra Pradesh		
Guindy Links	Chennai	Tamil Nadu		
Gymkhana Club	Chennai	Tamil Nadu	1886	
Hyderabad Golf Club	Hyderabad	Telangana		
Haldi Golf County	Hyderabad	Telangana		
Hisar Police Lines Golf Course	Hisar	Haryana		
ITC Grand Bharat	Gurgaon	Haryana	1975	
Jaipur Golf Club	Jaipur	Rajasthan		
Jayachamaraja Wodeyar Golf Course	Mysuru	Karnataka		
Jaypee Greens Golf Club	Greater Noida	Uttar Pradesh		
Jorhat Gymkhana Club	Jorhat	Assam	1876	
Kalhaar Blues & Greens Golf Club	Ahmedabad	Gujarat	2012	
Karnataka Golf Association	Bengaluru	Karnataka		
Kensville Golf and Country Club	Ahmedabad	Gujarat	2006	
Kodaikanal Golf Club	Kodaikanal	Tamil Nadu	1892	
Naldehra Golf Club	Shimla	Himachal Pradesh		
Noida Golf Course	Noida	Uttar Pradesh	1990	
Lucknow Golf Club	Lucknow	Uttar Pradesh	1950	
Ooty Golf Course	Ooty	Tamil Nadu	1896	
Panchkula Golf Course	Panchkula	Haryana	2003	
Patna Golf Club	Patna	Bihar	1916	
Prestige Golfshire	Bengaluru	Karnataka	2011	
Poona Golf Club	Pune	Maharashtra		
Prestige Augusta Golf Village	Bengaluru	Karnataka		
Royal Calcutta Golf Club	Kolkata	West Bengal	1829	
Royal Garha Golf Club	Indore	Madhya Pradesh	2010	
Royal Springs Golf Course	Srinagar	Jammu and Kashmir	2001	
Thiruvananthapuram Golf Club	Thiruvananthapuram	Kerala	1850	
Tollygunge Club	Kolkata	West Bengal	1895	
Riverside Golf Course, Niphad	Nashik	Maharashtra	2016	
