= Sports in Thiruvananthapuram =

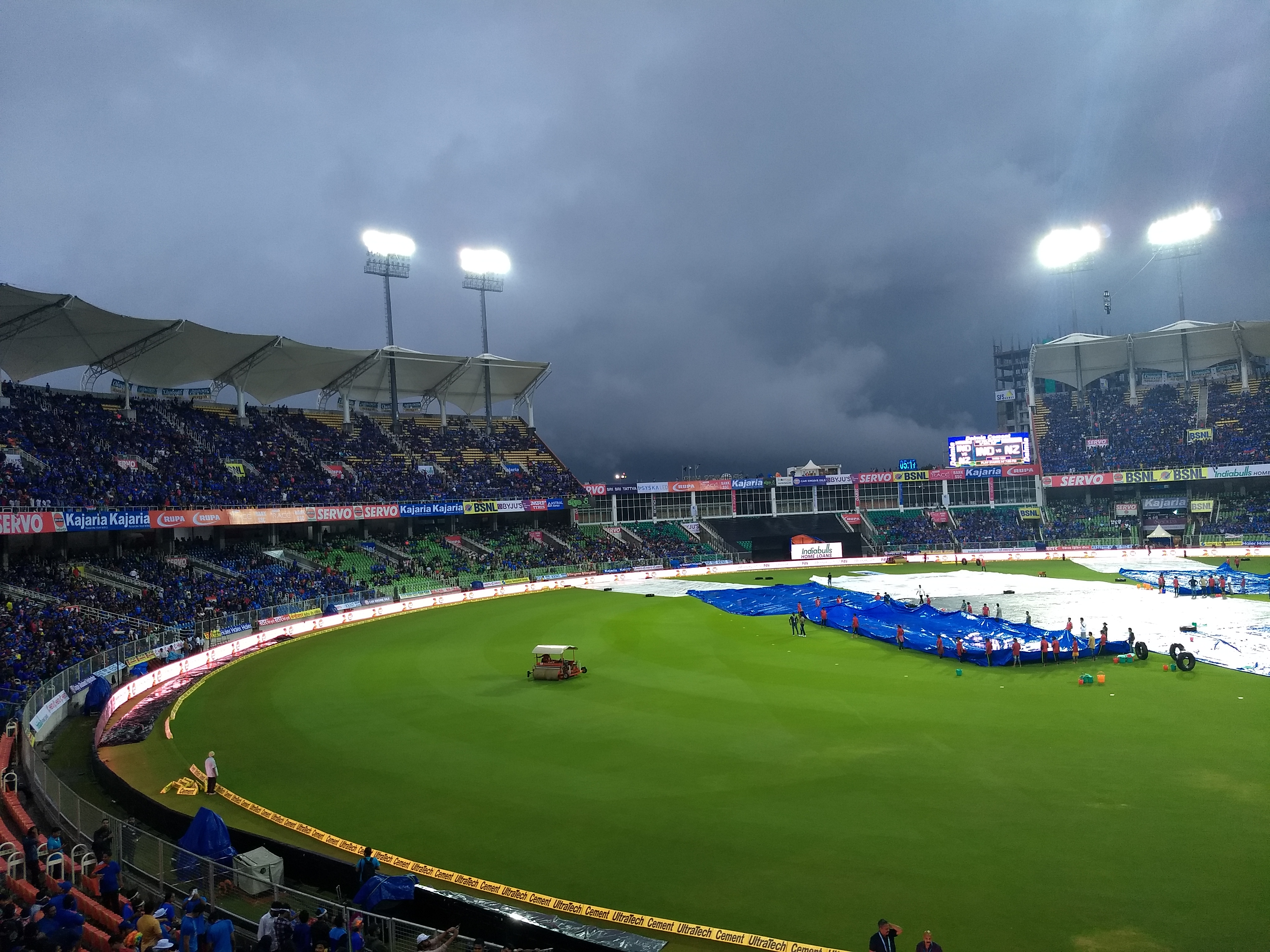
Sports Hub (Greenfield Stadium) during the India vs New Zealand T20

Cricket and Football are the most popular sports in Thiruvananthapuram. The Sports Hub, Trivandrum, commonly known as Greenfield Stadium is one of the largest cricket and football stadiums in India. Athletics, shooting, volleyball, Aquatics and squash are the other popular sports.

== Cricket ==
Like elsewhere in India, Cricket is the most popular sport in Thiruvananthapuram. The Sports Hub, Trivandrum, has a seating capacity more than 50,000. In 1984 the city hosted the first international cricket match in Kerala at the University Stadium. The city also hosted the first T20 International cricket match in Kerala. Prominent cricketers from Thiruvananthapuram include Sanju Samson, Raiphi Gomez, Ryan Ninan, Aneil Nambiar, K. N. Ananthapadmanabhan, Rohan Prem, Udiramala Subramaniam, P. M. K. Mohandas, Bhaskar Pillai, Subramaniam brothers, Godwin brothers and Padmanabhan Prasanth. The Kerala Cricket Association is headquartered in Thiruvananthapuram.

== Football ==
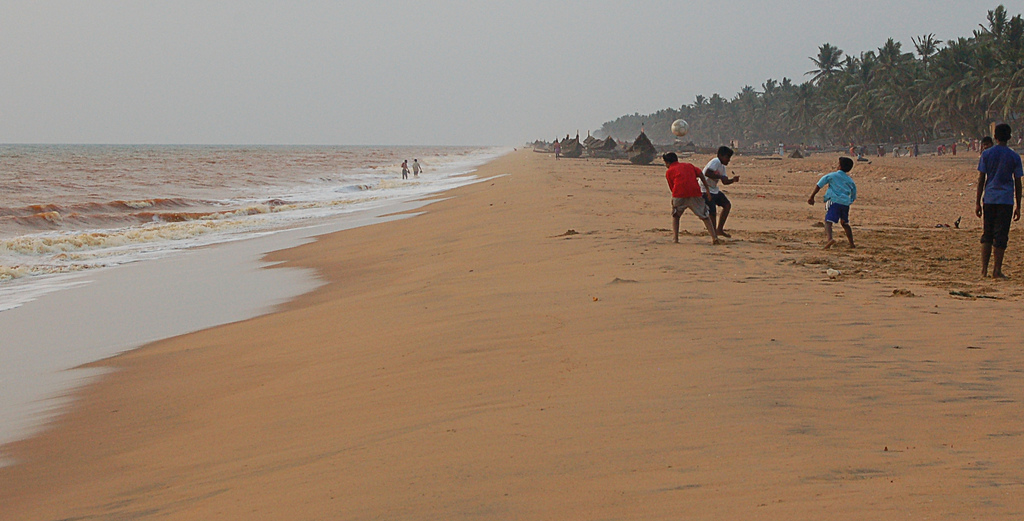
Kids playing football in the beach. Football is a popular sport in the city.

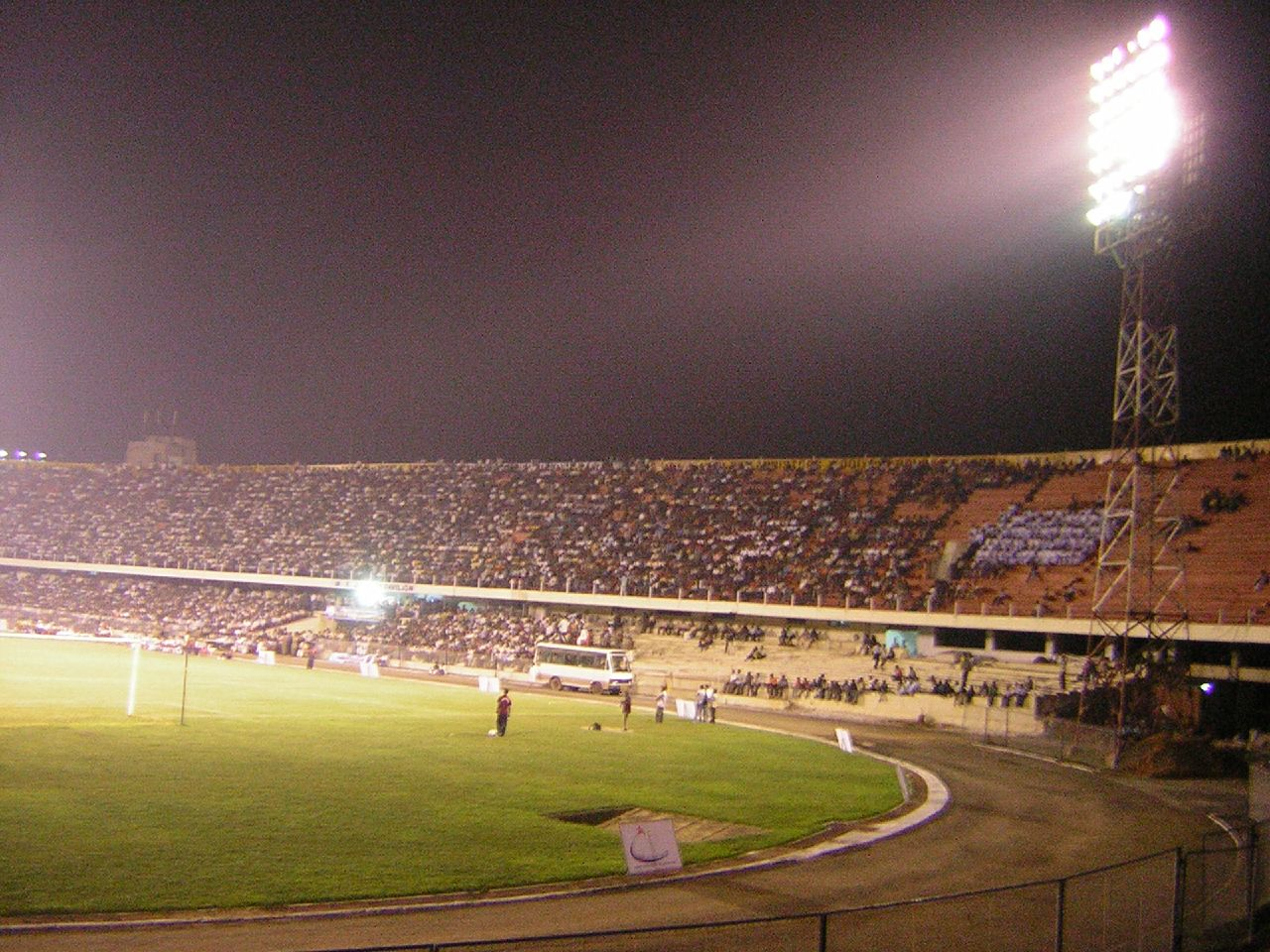
A football match in CSN Stadium

Another popular sport in Thiruvananthapuram is football. Thiruvananthapuram hosted the 2015 SAFF Championship at the Greenfield Stadium. SBI Kerala, Titanium FC, KSEB Travancore Royals FC and Kovalam FC are the major football clubs based in Thiruvananthapuram.

On 29 November 2018 India's First Fans owned Football club Travancore Royals FC was launched in Thiruvananthapuram.

== Athletics ==
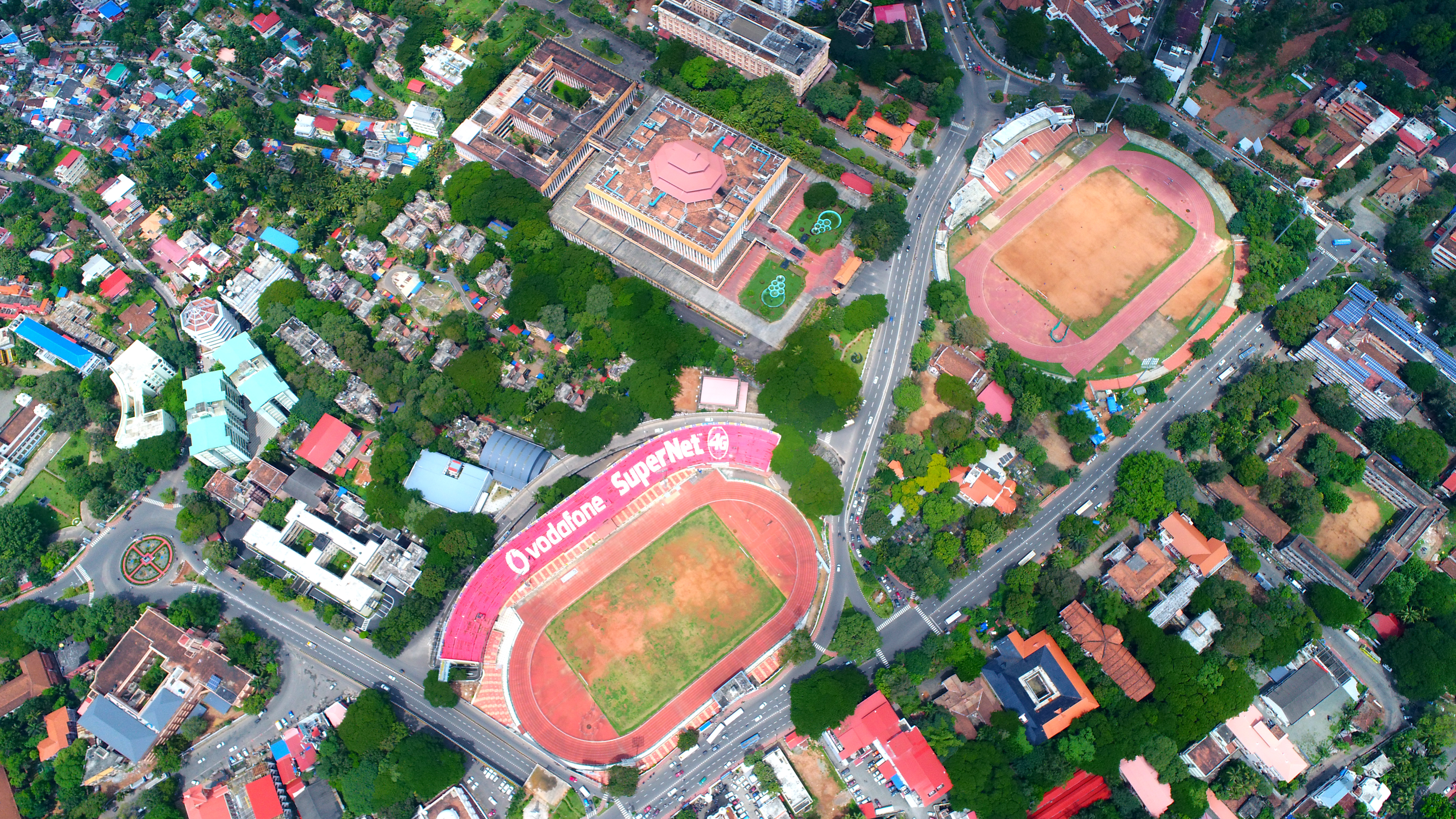
A view of University Stadium (Right) and CSN stadium (left)

Athletic competitions are usually held at the University Stadium, Chandrasekharan Nair Stadium and Central Stadium. The Trivandrum Marathon is a marathon organised by the Trivandrum runners club every year. There will be two main races; a half marathon of 21 km and a full marathon of 42.19 km. A special 2 km fun run is also organised for public participation. TrivandRun is another marathon conducted every January in the city.

== Other ==
Other popular sports in the city are Volleyball, Basketball, shooting and Aquatics. India national volleyball player K. J. Kapil Dev is from the city. Many basketball tournaments are conducted in the city. Most of them are inter-school tournaments organised by the schools in the city. Trivandrum hosted the 61st National Shooting Championship at the Vattiyoorkavu Shooting Range. Surfing is also a popular sport in the beaches. Many Surfing and Stand Up Paddle tournaments organised in the city. The surf competitions are usually held in Kovalam Beach and Varkala Beach.

The Trivandrum Golf Club, officially known as SAI Trivandrum golf club is a nine-hole golf course in the heart of the city. Established in 1850, it is one of the oldest golf course in India. It is currently leased to the Sports Authority of India.

== Sporting facilities ==
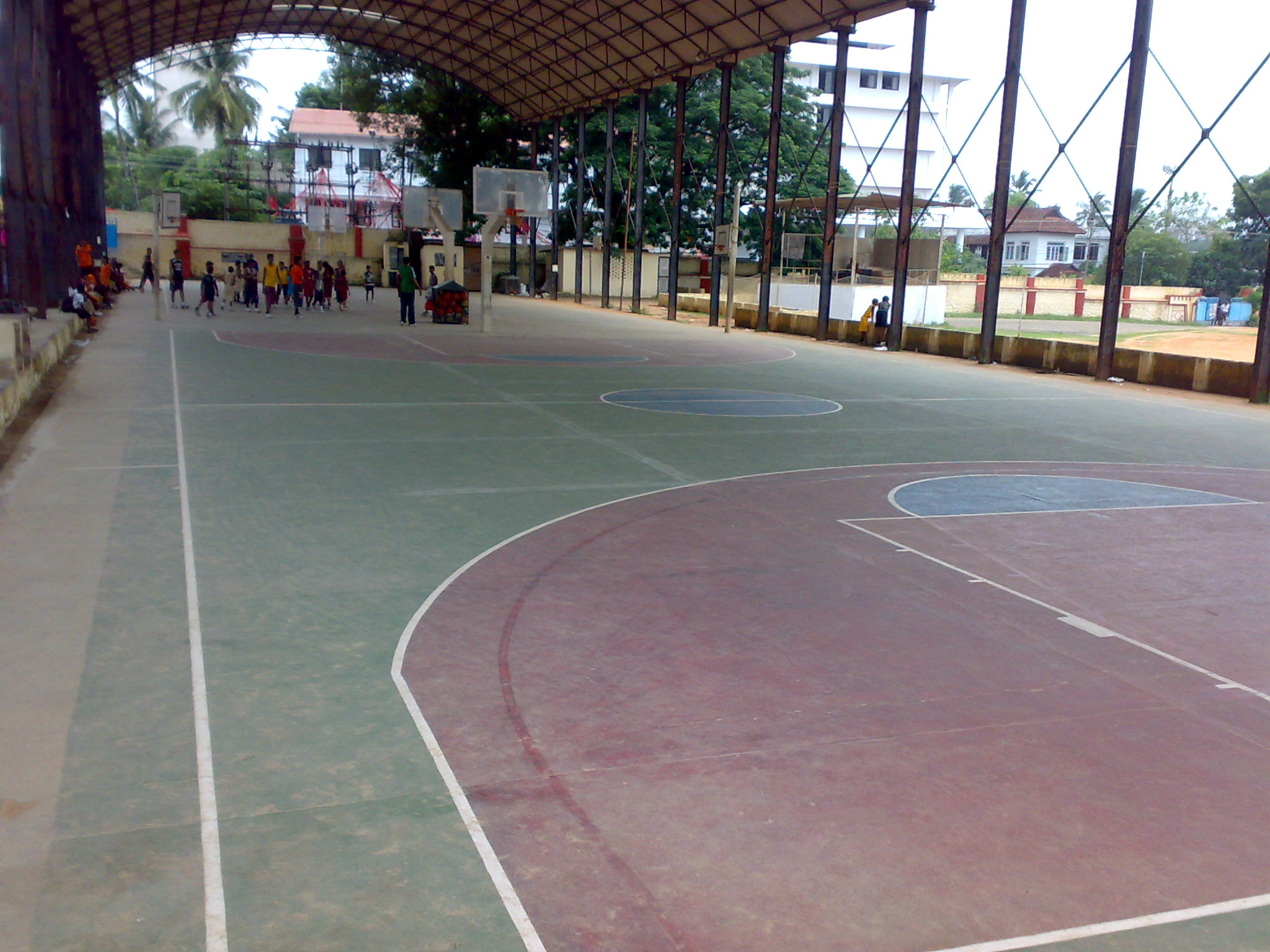
Basketball court in Central Stadium

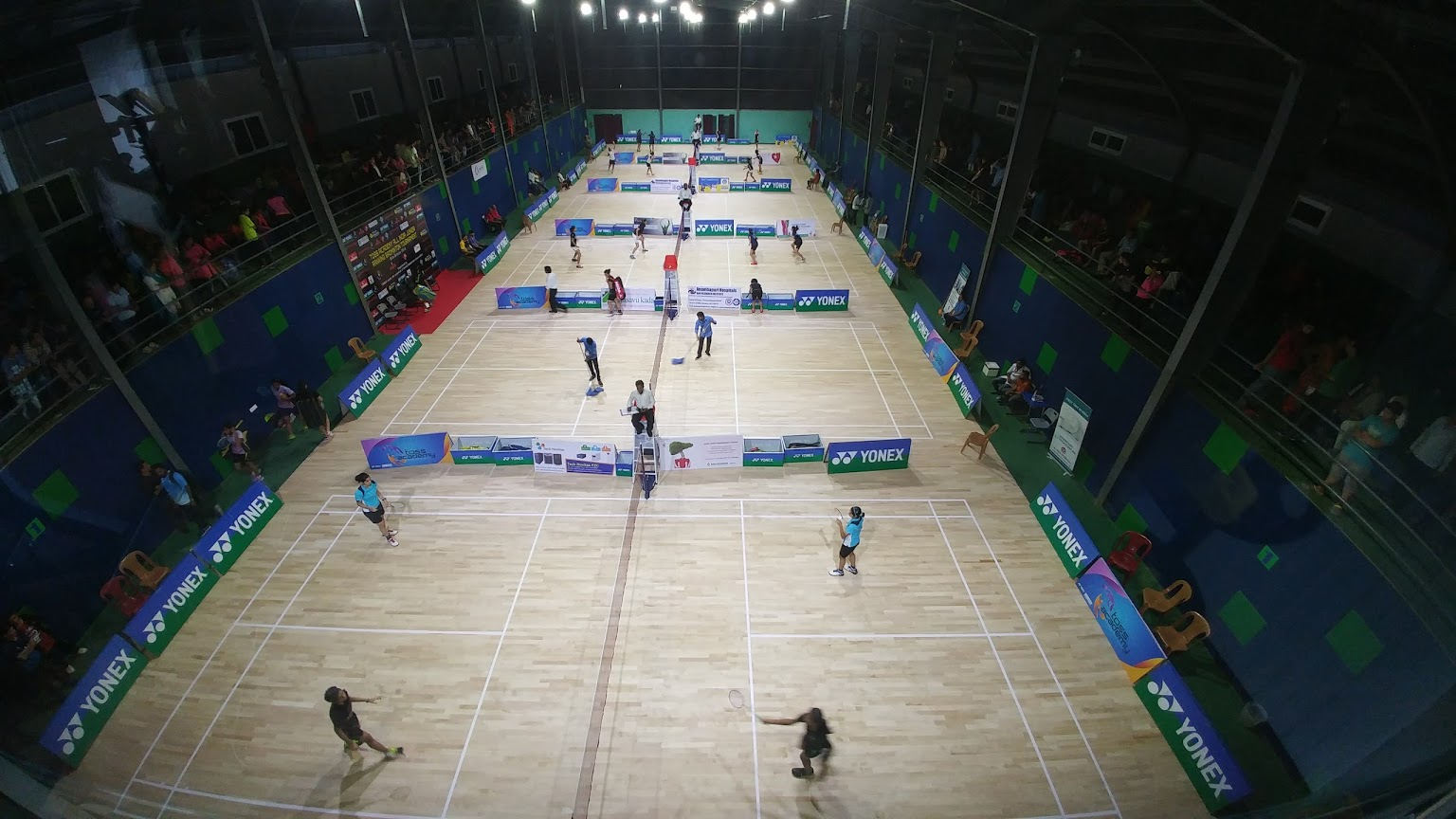
Badminton at TOSS Academy

The city has facilities to host most type of sports. Thiruvananthapuram was one of the main venues for the 2015 National Games of India.

S.No.	Centre	Sports
1	The Sports Hub, Trivandrum International Stadium	Sports hub
2	Jimmy George Sports Hub	Sports hub
3	LNCPE Karyavattom	Sports hub
4	Chandrasekharan Nair Stadium	Athletics, association football
5	University Stadium	Athletics, association football
6	Central Stadium	Athletics, association football, multi-purpose stadium
7	Kerala Police Academy	Shooting
8	Vattiyoorkavu Shooting Range	Shooting
9	Thiruvananthapuram Tennis Club	Tennis
10	Ramanathan Krishnan Tennis Complex	Tennis
11	Pirappancode Aquatics Complex	Aquatics
12	Shankumugham Beach	Beach handball
13	Thiruvananthapuram Golf Club	Golf
14	CSN Squash Court	Squash
15	Sreepadam Stadium	Kho Kho, Kabadi
16	Thankamma Stadium	Association football
17	LNCPE Velodrome and Indoor Stadium	Cycling, wushu
18	St.Xaviers Cricket Ground, Thumba	Cricket
19	Agricultural College Indoor Stadium	Sports hub, taekwondo, netball
20	Toss Academy	Shuttle badminton
