= East Point Golf Club =

Golf Course in Vizag, India

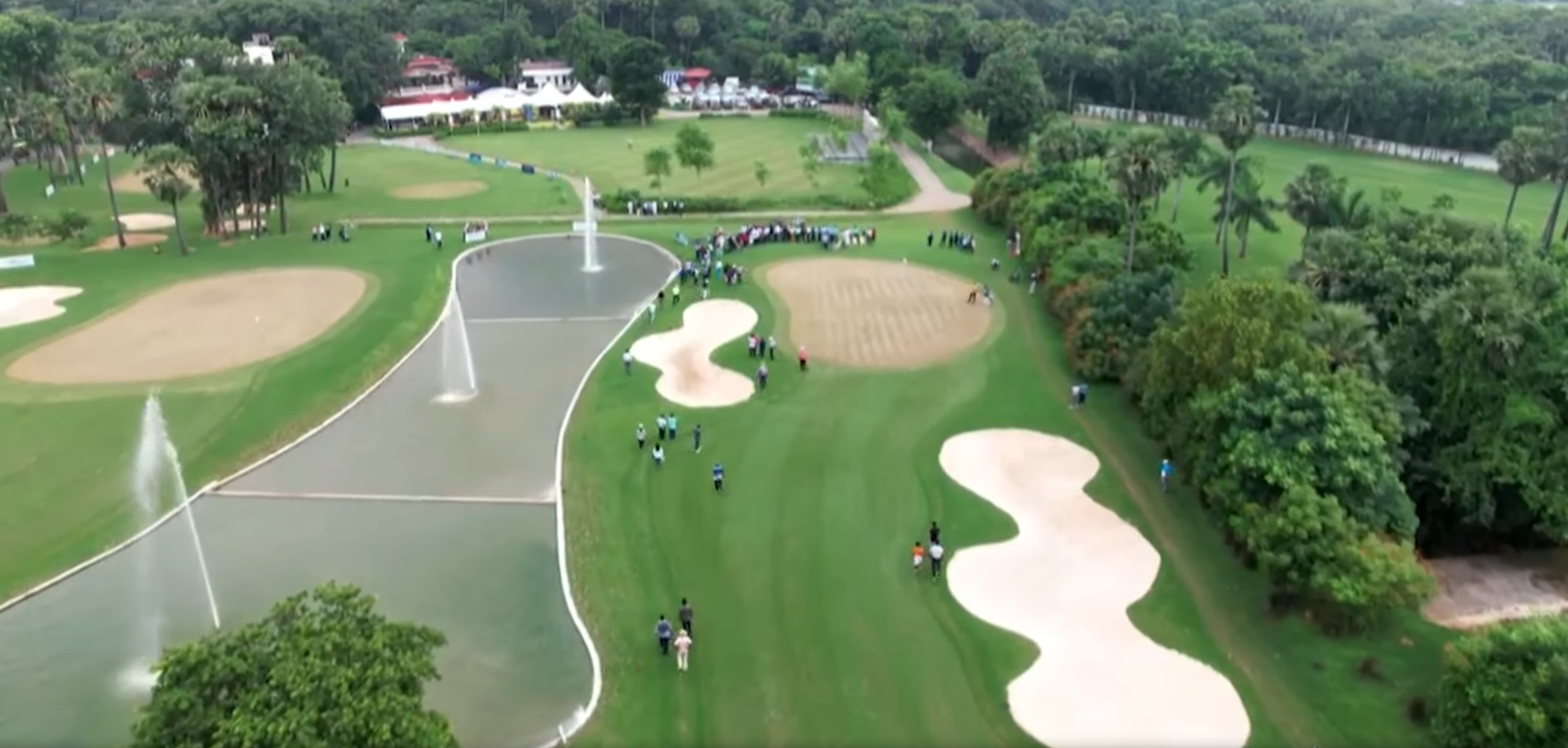
- Aerial view of East Point Golf Course
- Interactive map of East Point Golf Club
- 17.7675°N 83.3027°E

Club information
- Established: 1884
- Tota holes: 18
- Tournaments: 2023 PGTI Vizag Open
- Website: https://epgc.in/

East Point Golf Course
- Par: 71
- Length: 5,850 yards (5,350 m)
- Course rating: 66.7
- Slope rating: 113
- East Point Golf Course

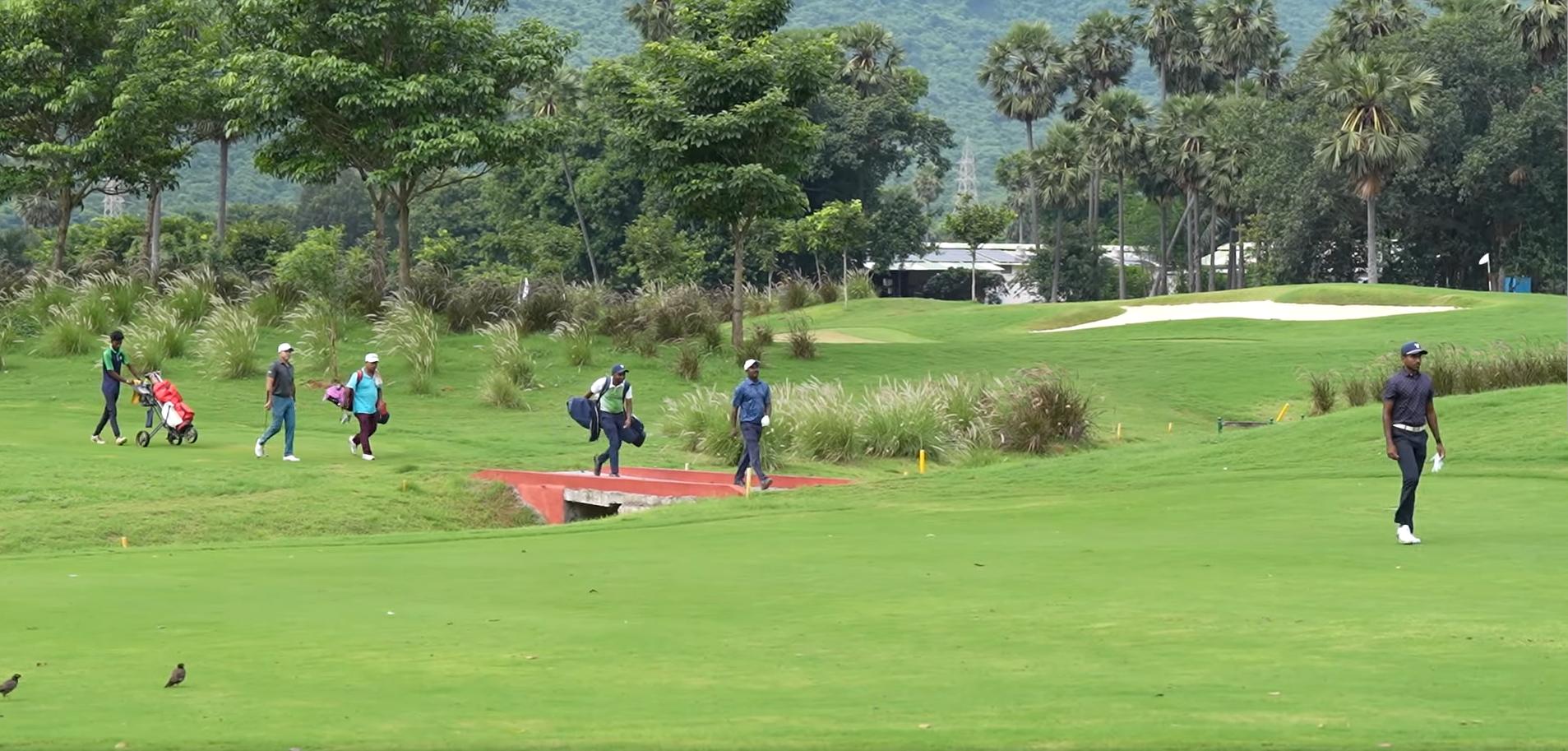
Golfers at East Point Golf Course during Vizag Open 2023

East Point Golf Club is a golf course started in 1884 in Visakhapatnam. It is one of the very few golf courses in the Andhra Pradesh state, with others being a defense golf course handled by the Indian Navy in Vizag and another one in Rajahmundry called the Godavari golf course by ONGC. It was situated at the shore, where the VUDA Park is situated today, and was later constructed near the Mudasarlova Park. It has a total of 1400 members out of which 300 are active and it is run by 64 staff members. It was upgraded to Category A Championship Course in 2021 and received the "Best Renovated Golf Course Award" at the GIA Summit 2022 in New Delhi. The club held its first PGTI tournament from 18 to 23 September 2023.

== History ==
The golf course was established at East Point at the shore in 1884 for British officers stationed in Vizag and Indians were not allowed until 1964. The course was shut down in 1964 when a clash arose between Raja Sahib of Gangpur and other members and Gangpur raised the rent of land from 500 rupees per annum to 5000 rupees per annum. This is when Raja of Vizianagaram helped the club acquire 100 acres of land at Mudasarlova under lease for 99 years at 500 rupees per annum.

During the world wars, it was closed and was opened again in 1955 by a subsidiary of Caltex Oil Refinery in India which later became Hindustan Petroleum. They maintained it till 1964.

== Tournaments ==
- Vizag Open 2024 - October 2024
- Sun International Vizag Vista Golf Cup - January 2025

== See also ==
- List of golf courses in India
- Sports in Andhra Pradesh
