= Naya Qila =

Historic site in India

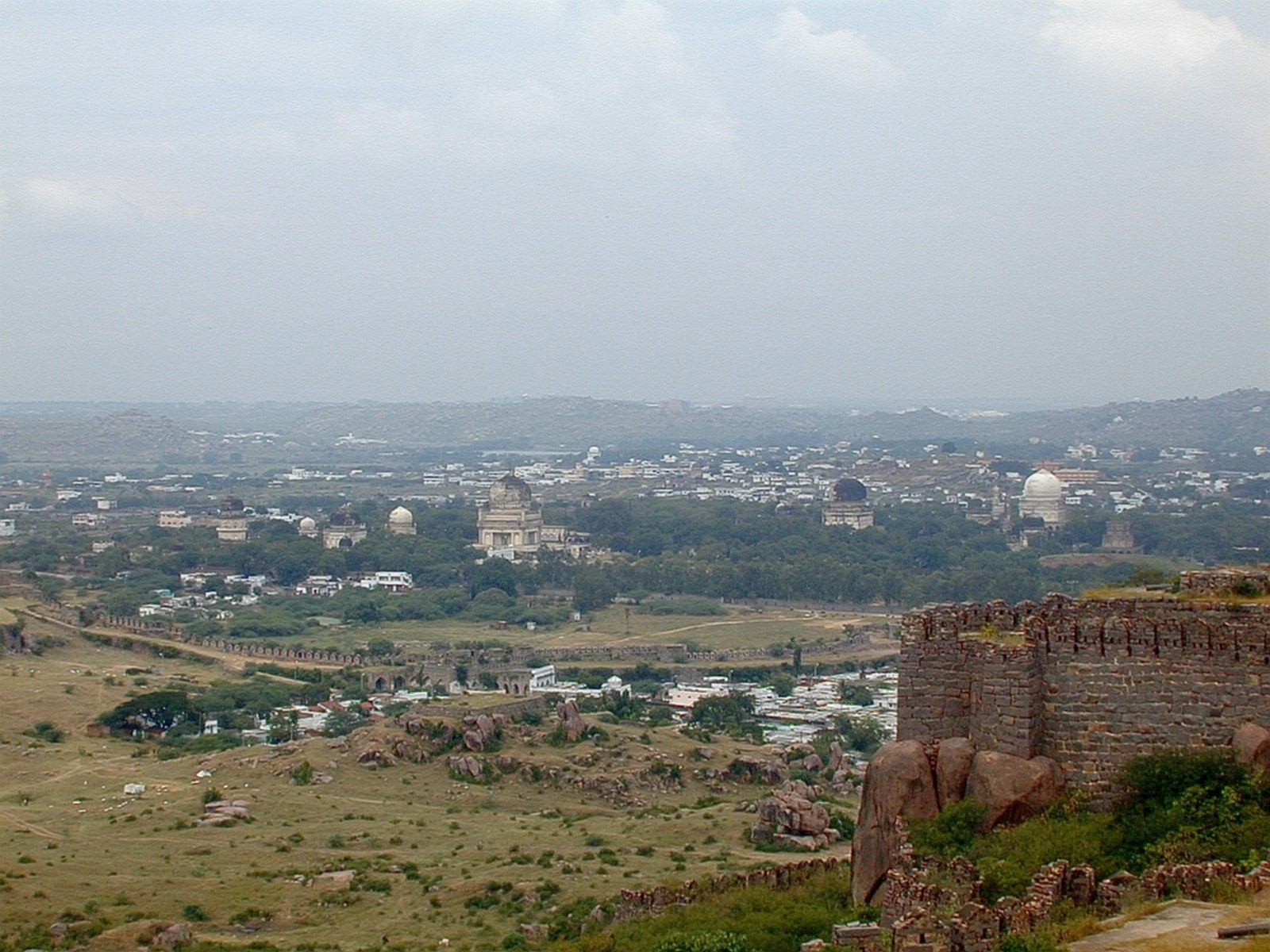
Panoramic view over the southern side of Naya Qila from the top of the Golkonda.

Naya Qila ("New Fort", also spelled Naya Quila) is an extended portion of Golkonda Fort in Hyderabad, India. It was built in 1656 by Sultan Abdullah Qutb Shah as further defence for the Mughal armies. This integral part of the Golkonda fort contains many historic structures. There are strange figures and animals worked out of stone and stucco on the walls of the outer fort facing the Naya Qila. It is one of the least explored heritage sites of India, partly because it has become part of a golf course, which makes access for visitors complicated.

== History ==
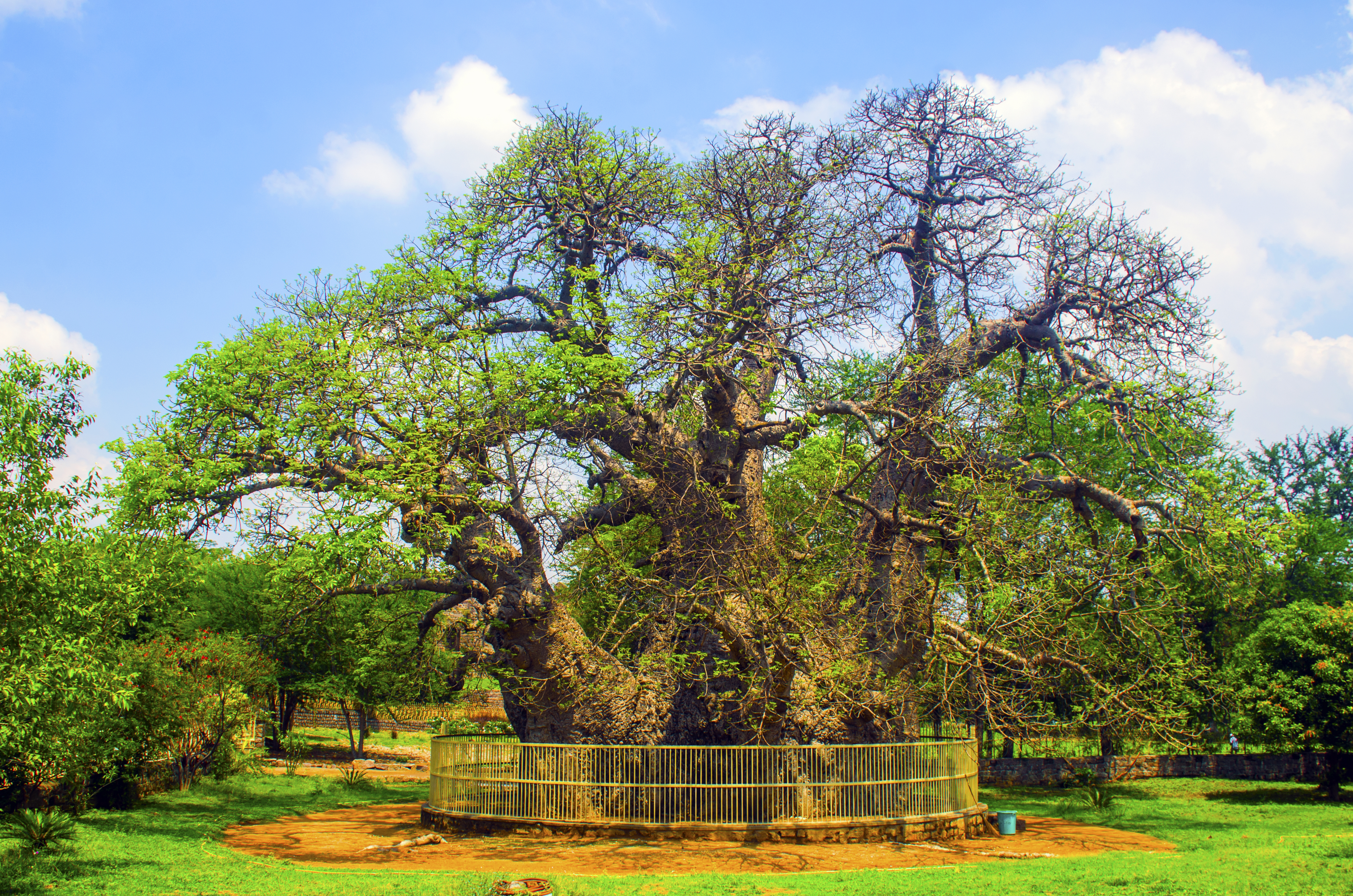
Hatiyan ka Jhad (Baobab Tree) in Naya Qila

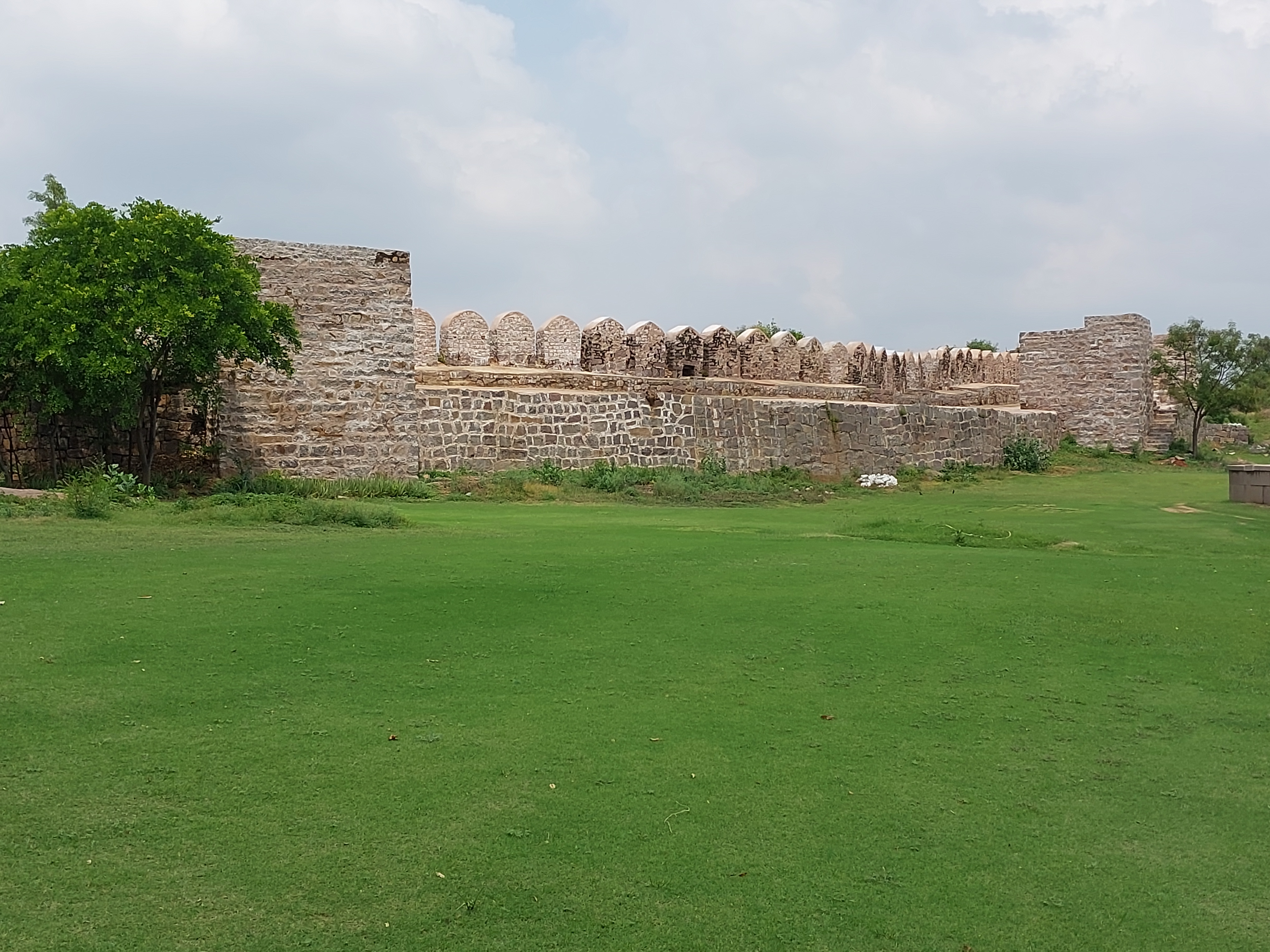
Battlements of Naya Qila Fort

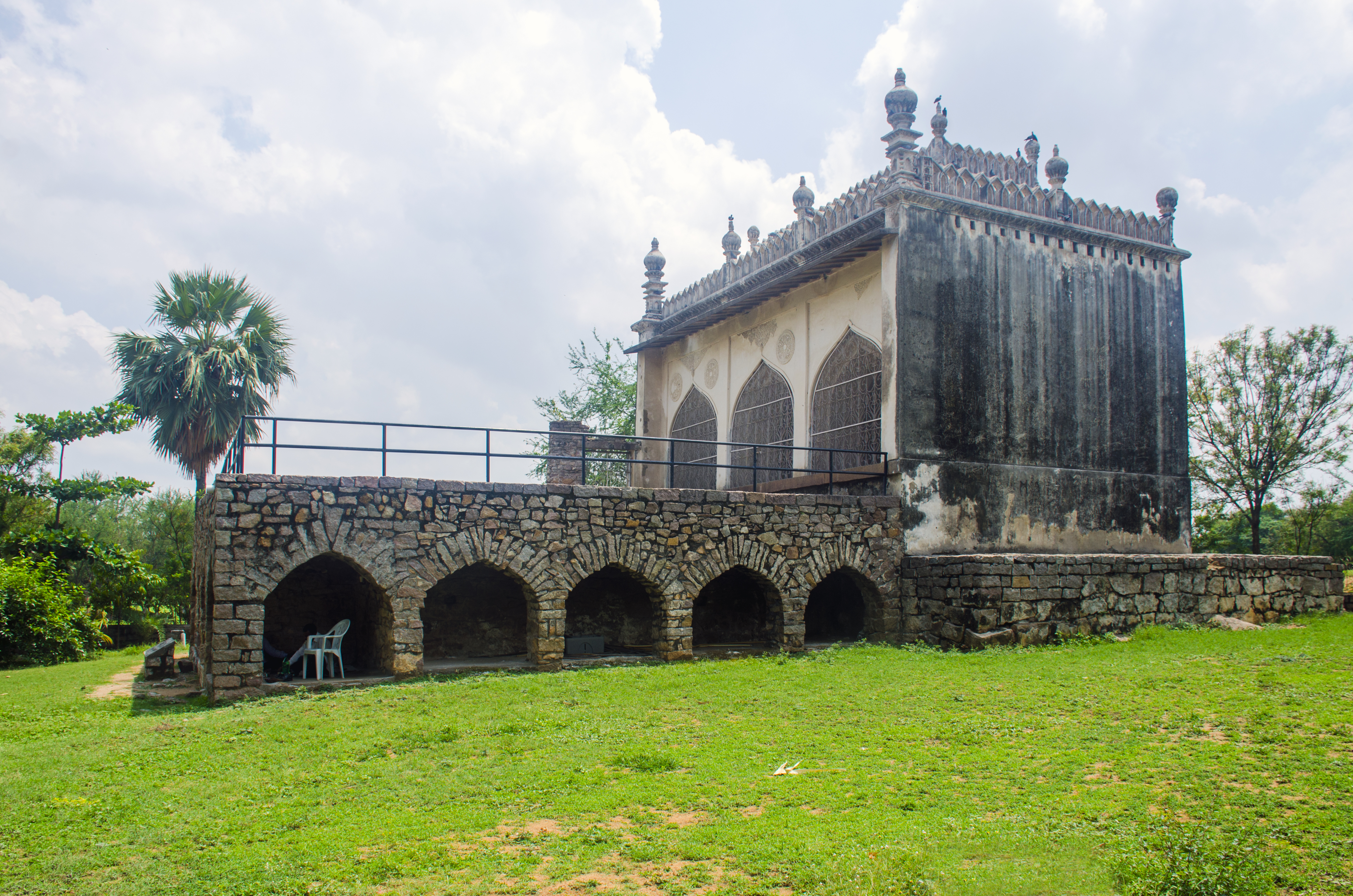
Mulla Khayali Mosque

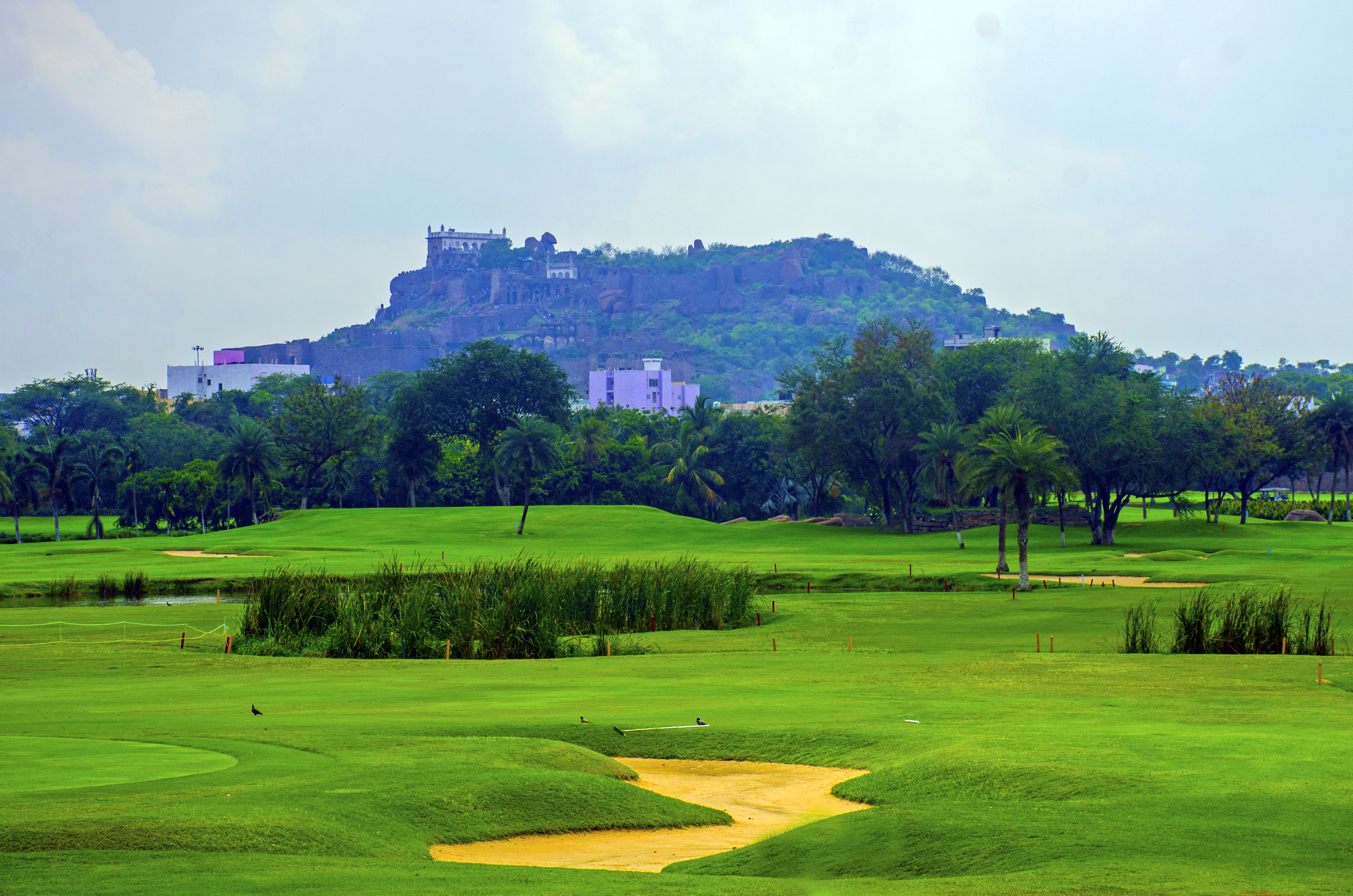
Golconda Fort towers above the golf course of Naya Qila

During the rule of Sultan Abdullah Qutb Shah (1625–1672), Mughal governor of the Deccan Plateau, Aurangzeb aimed the fusillade against Golkonda Fort in January 1656. The mighty Mughal army kept up the cannon-fire but the fort stood firm. After a four-month siege, the Mughal army withdrew in April 1656. Due to heavy fusillade by the Mughals, the fort became weak and Fort walls started leaning, thus to avoid future attacks and loss Sultan Abdullah Qutb Shah ordered for the repair of fort walls and the extension of Golkonda fort, thus the construction of Naya Qila was started in the year 1656 and was completed with more additions by Sultan Abul Hasan Qutb Shah. and nearly, 30 years later when Aurangzeb become the emperor, again he set his sights on the Golkonda he completely avoided the place because the place from where he aimed the fusillade, stood the Naya Qila. A rock masonry structure with moats, it made the Golkonda all the more impregnable. In 1687 Aurangzeb annexed Golkonda.

The fort was designed and constructed by Mustafa Khan, the royal architect of the Qutb Shahi dynasty; Makkah Masjid and Toli Masjid was designed and constructed by him.

== Attraction ==
- The Persian garden (Bagh-i-Qutb), built by Abdullah Qutb Shah (1625–1672).
- Hatiyan ka Jhad ("Elephant-sized Tree"): This famous baobab located on the premises of Naya Qila is more than 400 years old. Arab traders introduced this tree to Hyderabad and it was given to Sultan Muhammad Quli Qutb Shah by Arab traders. This tree have the girth of 27.40 meters (89 feet). The cave formed in between the branches of this tree. There are various stories centred on this baobab tree and one of the famous stories is related to its cave which helped some 40 notorious thieves to hide themselves some 400 years ago.
- The Mosque of Mustafa Khan: build in memory of the royal architect of the Qutb Shahi dynasty.
- Mosque Mullah Khiyali: constructed in memory of the royal poet of the Qutb Shahi dynasty. Both, Mosque of Mustafa Khan and the Mosque of Mullah Khiyali are critical examples of the early architecture of Golkonda.
- Naya Qila Talab: a water tank situated within the Naya Qila. Currently, this water body is badly-neglected. Ruins of the Naya Qila contain 350 years old fragments of earthen pipes used for water supply during the Qutb Shahi rule.

== Controversies ==
The construction of the Hyderabad Golf Course in the Naya Qila area met with a lot of resistance from various NGOs and organisations. According to them, the Golf Course and the almost exclusive access given to its members was against the proper use of the Heritage site which should give easy access and ownership to the public above anything else. There were also protests organised by the farmers who were displaced by the construction of the Golf Course who were eventually offered land in the city in return for their land in the Golkonda fort area. The controversy regarding the historic lands' use as a golf course also sparked debates among scholars part of the heritage and conversation circles around the 'Adopt a Heritage' scheme of the government of India, under which the Dalmia Bharat Private Limited was allowed to adopt the Red Fort. There have also been concerns regarding the negative ecological implications of the Golf Course, outlined in a comprehensive document shared by the NGO, Better Hyderabad.

== See also ==
- Charminar
