= ITC Hotels =

Indian hotel chain

ITC Hotels Limited

- ITC Green Center in Gurugram
- Type: Public
- Traded as: NSE: ITCHOTELS; BSE: 544325
- Industry: Hospitality
- Founded: 1975; 51 years ago
- Headquarters: Gurugram, Haryana, India
- Number of locations: 90+
- Area served: India, Sri Lanka
- Key people: Anil Chadha (MD & CEO)
- Brands: ITC Hotels; Mementos by ITC Hotels; Welcomhotel by ITC Hotels; Storii by ITC Hotels; Fortune Hotels; WelcomHeritage Hotels
- Revenue: ▲₹3,103 crore (US$320 million) (FY2024)
- Net income: ▲₹765 crore (US$79 million) (FY2024)
- Total assets: ▲₹8,765 crore (US$910 million) (FY2024)
- Website: www.itchotels.com/in/en

ITC Hotels Limited is an Indian hospitality company established in 1975 and headquartered in Gurugram, Haryana. As of 2026, it operates more than operates 150+ hotels across 90+ destinations under seven brands: ITC Hotels, Mementos, Welcomhotel, Storii, Epiq Collection, Fortune Hotels and WelcomHeritage Hotels. Some of its hotels in India and Sri Lanka are operated as part of Marriott International's The Luxury Collection under a franchise agreement. The company refers to its sustainability approach as "Responsible Luxury".

ITC Hotels was a subsidiary of ITC Limited until the demerger of its hotel business took effect on 1 January 2025.

== History ==
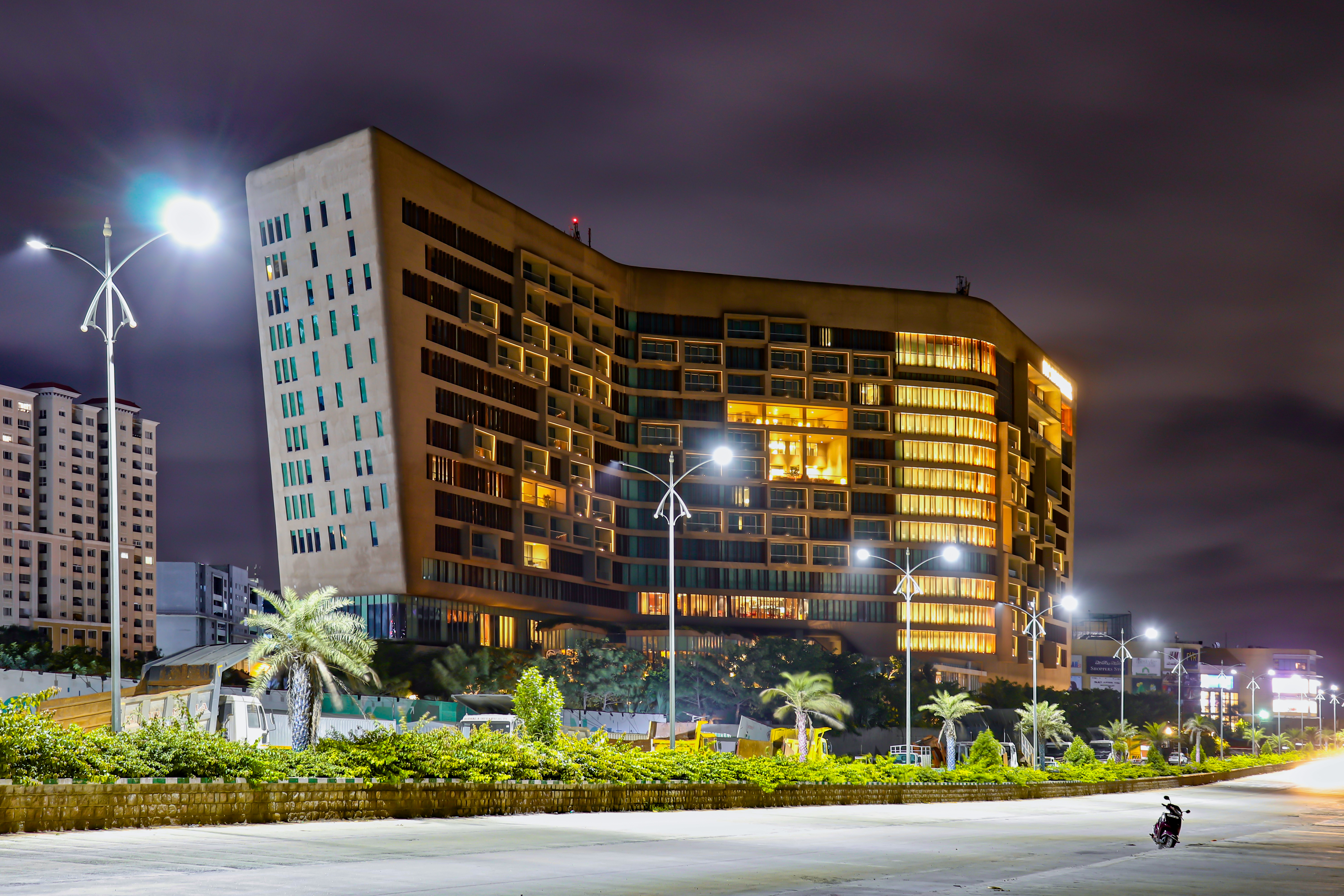
ITC Kohenur, Hyderabad

The ITC Limited entered the hotel business on 18 October 1975, with the opening of the Chola Hotel in Chennai. In 1979, as ITC's Welcomgroup hotel chain grew, it partnered with Sheraton Hotels to brand many of their properties as Sheratons.

ITC Hotels hosted many visiting royalty and world leaders, including George W. Bush, Vladimir Putin, Barack Obama and Donald Trump.

In September 2023, ITC Limited announced the demerger of its hotel business. The ITC Hotels demerger came into effect on 1 January 2025. Shareholders of ITC Limited were allotted one share of ITC Hotels for every 10 shares of the parent company.

Following its demerger into an independent entity, ITC Hotels Limited is currently led by Anil Chadha, who serves as the company's Managing Director.

== Brands ==
As of 2026, the company operates hotels under the following brands:

- ITC Hotels - the company's luxury brand, with hotels in major Indian cities and in Colombo, Sri Lanka (17 hotels).
- Mementos by ITC Hotels - a luxury brand launched in 2021 for hotels in leisure destinations; its first property opened in Udaipur (2 hotels).
- Epiq Collection - Epiq Collection by ITC Hotels is a premium hospitality brand comprising distinctive hotels and resorts that reflect the character of their respective destinations.
- Welcomhotel by ITC Hotels - an upper-upscale brand with hotels in business and leisure destinations across India (30 hotels).
- Storii By ITC Hotels - Storii by ITC Hotels is a collection of premium boutique hotels and resorts, with relatively small-scale properties across interesting destinations.
- Fortune Hotels - a mid-market brand established in 1995. (56 hotels).
- WelcomHeritage Hotels - a heritage hotel brand established in 1997 as a joint venture with Jodhana Heritage Resorts; its properties include palaces, forts, havelis and resorts (37 hotels).

== Notable hotels ==
- ITC Grand Bharat, Gurugram
- ITC Maurya, New Delhi
- ITC Rajputana, Jaipur
- ITC Mughal, Agra
- ITC Grand Chola, Chennai
- ITC Windsor, Bengaluru
- ITC Gardenia, Bengaluru
- ITC Kohenur, Hyderabad
- ITC Maratha, Mumbai
- ITC Grand Goa, Goa
- ITC Grand Central, Mumbai
- ITC Royal Bengal, Kolkata
- ITC Narmada, Ahmedabad
- ITC Kakatiya, Hyderabad
- ITC Ratnadipa, Colombo
- ITC Sonar, Kolkata
- Welcomhotel by ITC Hotels, Delhi (near Delhi-Gurugram border)
- Welcomhotel by ITC Hotels, Bay Island, Port Blair
- Welcomhotel by ITC Hotels, Guntur
- Welcomhotel by ITC Hotels, Race Course, Coimbatore
- Welcomhotel by ITC Hotels, Cathedral Road, Chennai
- Welcomhotel by ITC Hotels, Bhubaneswar
- Welcomhotel by ITC Hotels, Richmond Road, Bengaluru
- Welcomhotel by ITC Hotels, Raja Sansi, Amritsar
- Welcomhotel by ITC Hotels, Ahmedabad

== Cuisines and restaurants ==
Food and beverage operation form an integral part of ITC hotel limited's hospitality business. The company operates a portfolio of restaurant brand across its hotel network, including Bukhara, Dum Pukht, Avartana, Peshawri, Royal Vega, Kebabs & Kurries, Ottimo Cucina Italiana, Cajsa,Yi Jing, Dakshin, and Pan Asian.

These restaurants are located across ITC Hotels Limited properties and offer a range of culinary traditions, including North-West Frontier, Awadhi, South Indian, Chinese and Italian cuisines. The restaurant portfolio forms part of company's broader hospitality and food and beverage operation across its hotels brands.

== Sustainability ==
ITC Hotels Limited integrates sustainability into its operation through its Responsible Luxury framework, with initiatives focused on energy efficiency, renewable energy, water conservation, waste management, and sustainable building practices. The company has a portfolio of properties certified under the LEED (Leadership in Energy and Environmental Design) green building rating system, including LEED Platinum, LEED Zero Carbon, and LEED Zero Water certifications.

According to company disclosures, ITC Hotels Limited reported that its portfolio comprised 25 LEED Platinum- certified hotels, 13 LEED Zero Carbon- certified hotels, and 13 LEED Zero Water- Certified hotels as of 2026.

== Awards ==
ITC Hotels received the Leadership Award for Organizational Excellence from the U.S. Green Building Council (USGBC) in 2024. The company was named Best Luxury Hotel Chain in Travel + Leisure India & South Asia's reader-voted India Best Awards, a title it won for the ninth consecutive year in 2025. Avartana at ITC Grand Chola, Chennai, was ranked 44th in Asia's 50 Best Restaurants 2024.
