= ITC Royal Bengal =

Hotel in Kolkata, India

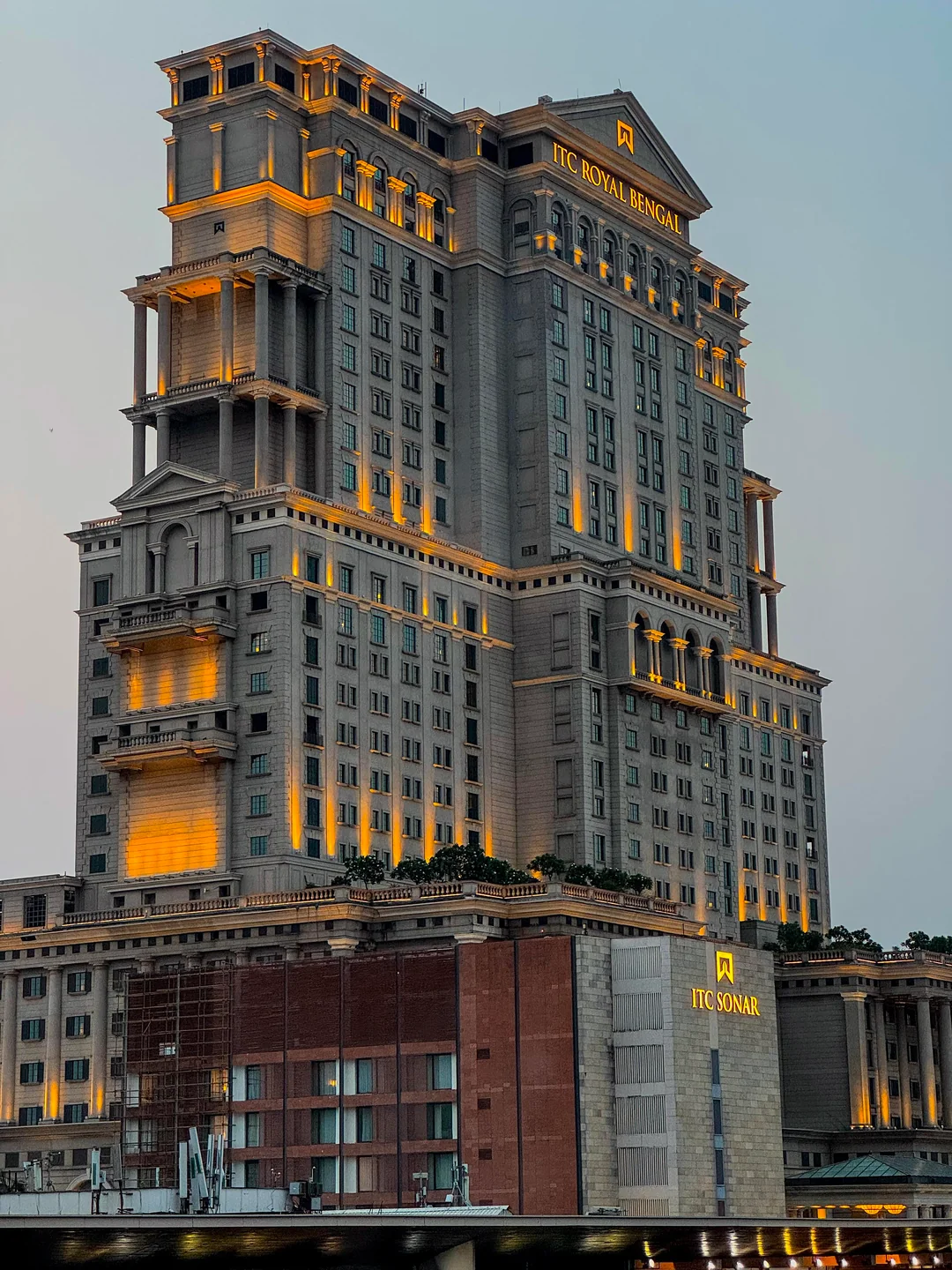

- Location in Kolkata
- Hotel chain: ITC Welcomgroup Hotels, Palaces and Resorts

General information
- Status: Completed
- Type: luxury hotel
- Architectural style: Art Deco
- Location: 1 JBS Haldane Ave, Kolkata, West Bengal 700046; India
- Coordinates: 22°32′45″N 88°23′52″E
- Opening: 11 June 2019; 7 years ago
- Owner: ITC Limited
- Operator: ITC Welcomgroup Hotels, Palaces and Resorts

Height
- Height: 133 metres (436 ft)

Technical details
- Floor count: 30

Other information
- Number of rooms: 456
- Number of suites: 12
- Number of restaurants: 12

Website
- ITC Royal Bengal

ITC Royal Bengal is a 5-star luxury hotel in Kolkata, India. Located along the Eastern Metropolitan Bypass, it is the 14th luxury hotel of ITC Hotels. Built on an area of 4.16 lakh (416,000) square feet, the construction cost of this hotel is ₹1400 crore (US$197 million). The ITC Royal Bengal has a 61,000 square-foot grand banquet, and 16,400 square-foot pillarless banquet. The hotel was opened in June 2019.

== History ==
ITC Royal Bengal was opened in June 2019 as the 14th luxury property by the ITC Hotels. It was followed by three years of planning and construction on a 4.16 lakh sq ft site along Kolkata’s Eastern Metropolitan Bypass. It was developed at a cost of ₹1,400 crore and inaugurated on 11 June 2019.

== Architecture ==
ITC Royal Bengal was designed by Hafeez Contractor in collaboration with local heritage architect Gaurav Shah, ITC Royal Bengal blends Greco‑Roman facades, with Doric columns and horse‑sloping entrance steps, regional motifs drawn from Bengal’s aristocratic "Bonedi Bari" homes and the Nawabi palaces of Murshidabad. The 30‑storey, 133 m‑high tower employs reinforced concrete and curtain‑wall glazing, while entrances and staircases feature Italian marble, Baluster‑string railings of Renaissance origin. Throughout, the building’s classical vocabulary arched pediments, colonnades and arcades is reinterpreted in contemporary proportions to create a new modern monument on Kolkata’s skyline. Art Nouveau door fittings were inspired by Abanindranath Tagore's kantha designs. Sustainable design features include maximized natural daylight in public areas, native‑species landscaping to reduce irrigation needs, and over 20% recycled and locally sourced construction materials as part of its pursuit of LEED Platinum and GRIHA Five Star certifications.

== Facilities ==
ITC Royal Bengal spans 456 accommodations including 374 rooms, 82 serviced apartments and 14 signature suites. ITC Royal Bengal offers 12 dining venues such as Royal Vega (vegetarian fine dining), Ottimo - Cucina Italiana, the all‑day Grand Market Pavilion, and the Darjeeling Lounge celebrating regional tea culture. Its banqueting facilities include a 61,000 sq ft grand ballroom and a 16,400 sq ft pillarless banquet hall, while the 24,000 sq ft. Kaya Kalp Royal Spa and a fitness centre occupy the upper levels.

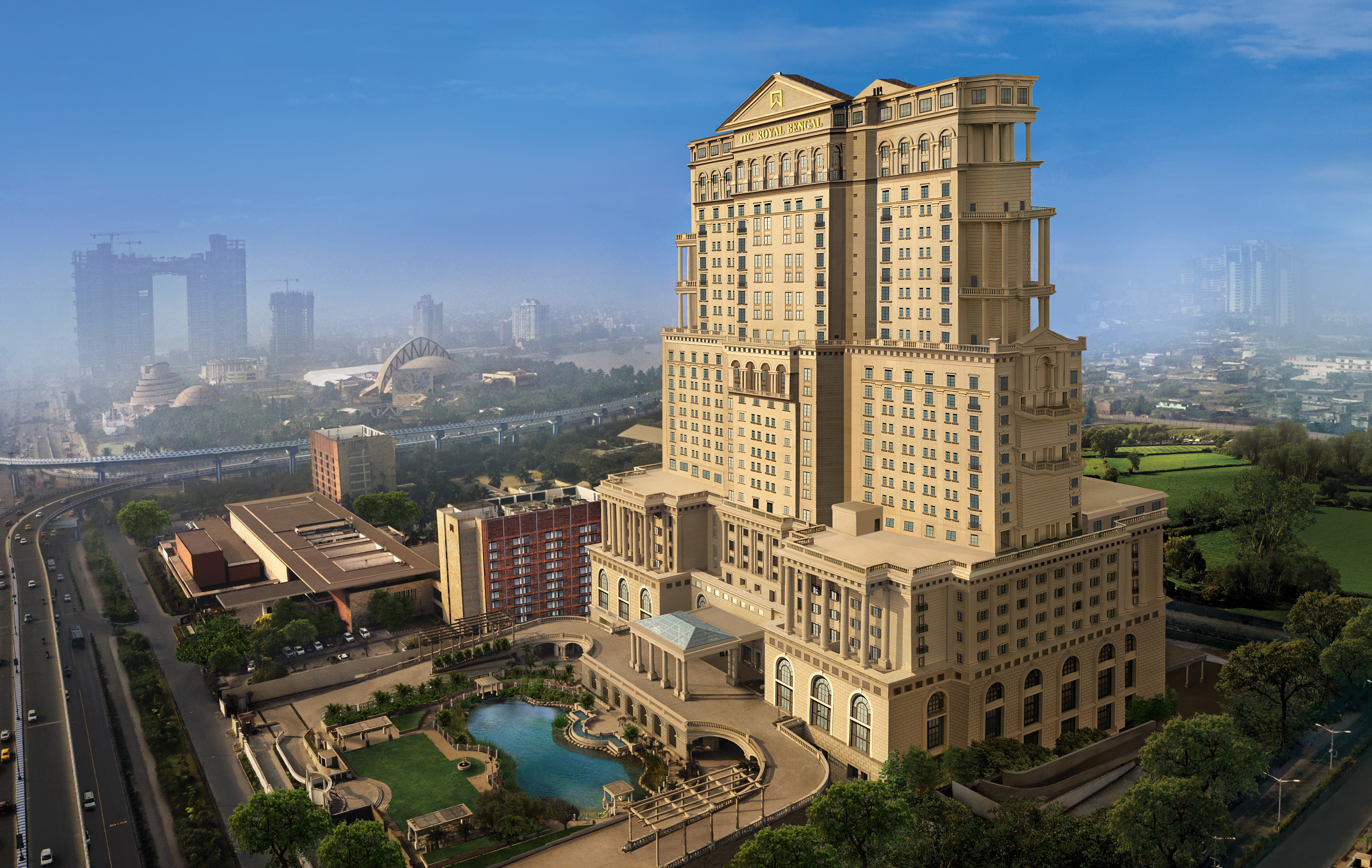
Ariel view of the hotel surrounding
