= Welcomhotel by ITC Hotels, Cathedral Road, Chennai =

Luxury hotel in Chennai, India

Coordinates: 13.045752°N 80.25679°E

- Interactive map of the Welcomhotel by ITC Hotels, Cathedral Road, Chennai area
- Hotel chain: ITC Welcomgroup Hotels, Palaces and Resorts

General information
- Location: India, 10, Cathedral Road, Chennai, Tamil Nadu 600 086, India
- Opening: 18 October 1975
- Operator: ITC Welcomgroup

Height
- Height: 39.75 m (130.4 ft)

Technical details
- Floor count: 10

Other information
- Number of rooms: 90

The Welcomhotel by ITC Hotels, Cathedral Road, Chennai is a five-star hotel located in Chennai, India. Opened in 1975, it was one of the first five-star hotels in the city, known as Madras at the time.

== History ==
=== The site ===
The hotel is built on the site of a historic guest house named Tilak Bhavan owned by Kasturi Ranga Iyengar. During Mahatma Gandhi's visit to Madras in 1919, the house was occupied by C. Rajagopalachari, and Gandhi chose to stay in this house from where he learnt about the infamous Rowlatt Bill. It was from here that Gandhi announced the launching of Satyagraha in protest against the draconian Act that the British Government proposed to implement. This incident, which virtually started Gandhi's freedom struggle, is commemorated in a squat pillar of the house, which is still in situ in front of the hotel.

=== The hotel ===
The Chola Hotel opened on 18 October 1975, marking the entry of ITC Limited into the hotel business. In 1978, Sheraton Hotels signed a marketing agreement with ITC to represent the properties of their WelcomHotels division, located across India. The hotel was rebranded the Chola Sheraton in 1980 and then the Welcomgroup Chola Sheraton in 1991.

On 15 October 2011, the hotel was re-branded the My Fortune, Chennai, the first hotel in the Fortune Park Hotels line, a wholly owned subsidiary of ITC Ltd. The hotel was again rebranded as WelcomHotel Chennai on 15 October 2017, and later as Welcomhotel by ITC Hotels, Cathedral Road, Chennai.

== The hotel ==
The hotel is 10 stories high and has 90 rooms, including 48 Fortune Club exclusive rooms (with an area of 650 sq ft), 26 Fortune Club rooms (with an area of 440 sq ft), and 16 standard rooms (220 sq ft). Food and beverages include Earthen Oven, a North Indian specialty restaurant, WelcomCafe Marina, 24-hour multi-cuisine restaurant, My Deli, serving light snacks and confectioneries, and Durrant's Bar.

There are three meeting halls in the hotel—Mandapam banquet hall, with an area of 1,880 sq ft to accommodate 200 persons, Sagari with an area of 1,400 sq ft to accommodate 60 persons, and Mandapam board room with an area of 480 sq ft. accommodating 18 persons. There are also Business Center Board Room with an area of 238 sq ft accommodating 8 persons and Business Centre Office with an area of 156 sq ft accommodating 4 persons. The poolside can accommodate about 50 persons.

The hotel closed on 1 March 2023 for major renovations. It reopened in January 2024.

== See also ==
- Hotels in Chennai
- List of tallest buildings in Chennai
