= Central Stadium (Thiruvananthapuram) =

Multi-purpose stadium in India

- Central Stadium
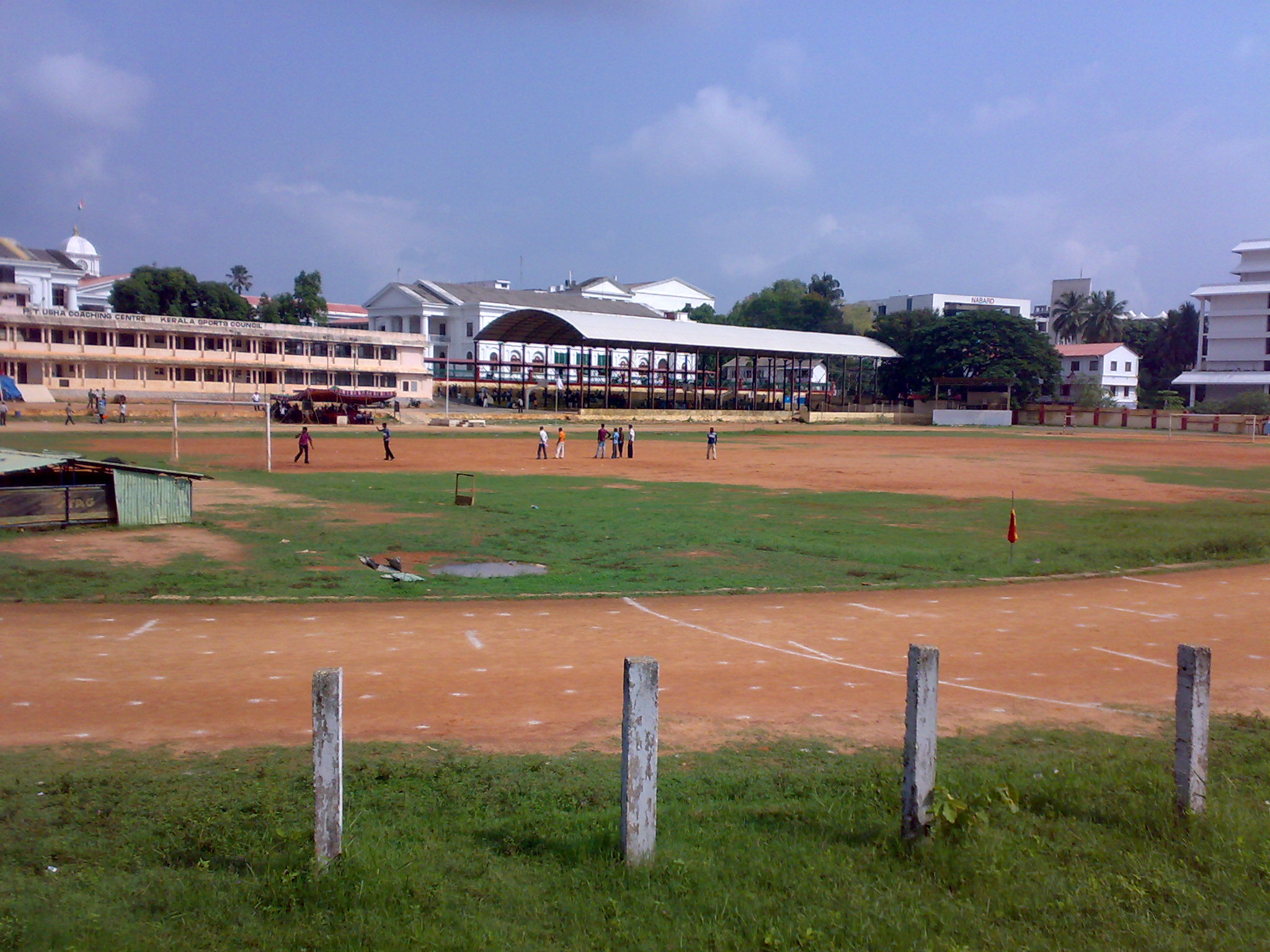
- Full name: Central Stadium
- Location: Thiruvananthapuram, Kerala, India
- Owner: Kerala State Sports Council
- Capacity: 15,000

Central Stadium, is a multi-purpose stadium in Thiruvananthapuram, India. It is mainly used for athletics and football. The stadium also hosts the Independence day parade of Kerala and other government functions. The stadium hosted India's first transgender athletics meet in 2017. The stadium is also one the main venues of annual Onam festival in Thiruvananthapuram.

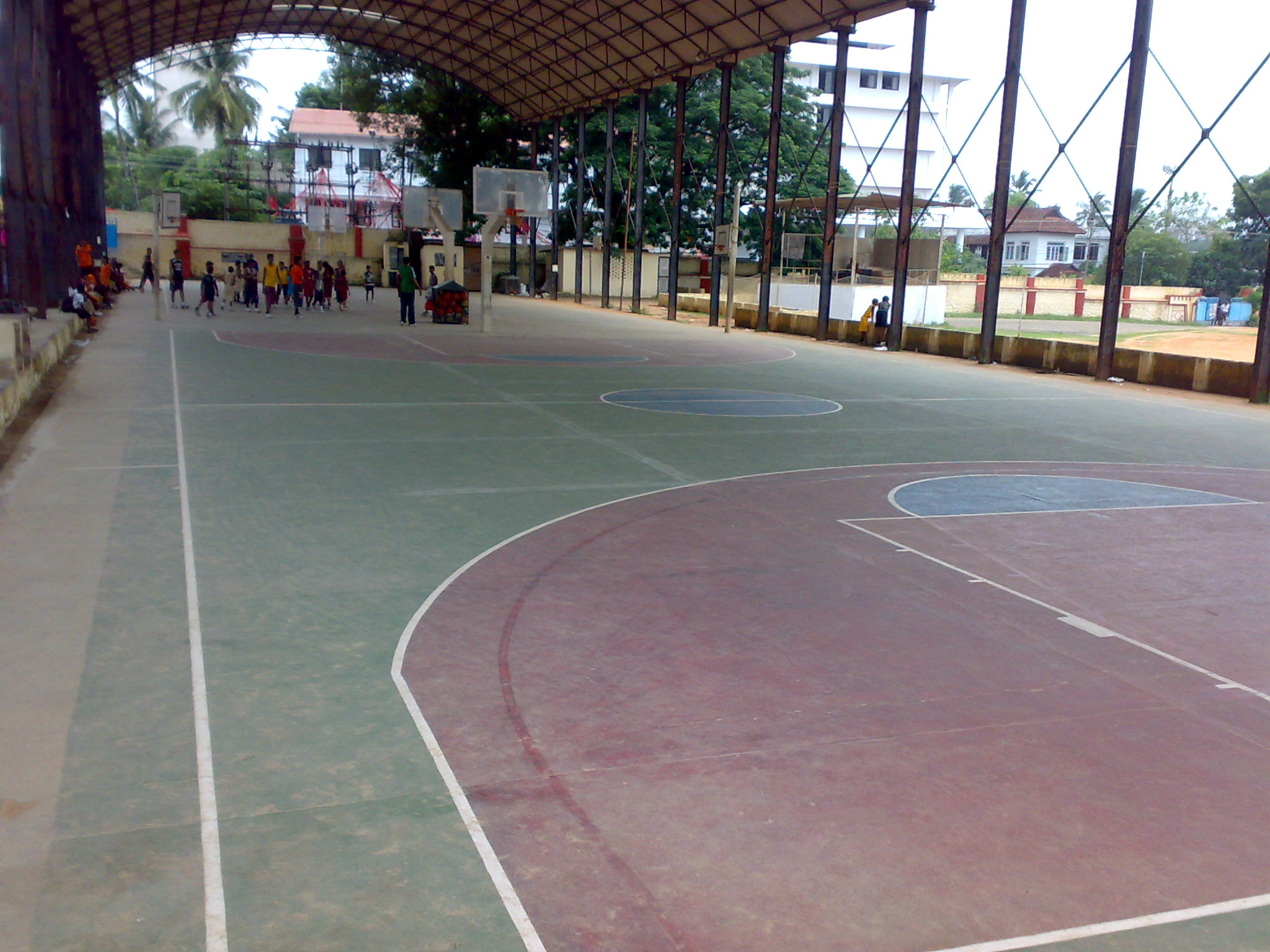
Basketball court in Central Stadium
