= Cosmopolitan Club (Chennai) =

Golf course in Chennai, India

Coordinates: 13.02014°N 80.234431°E

Cosmopolitan Club, Chennai
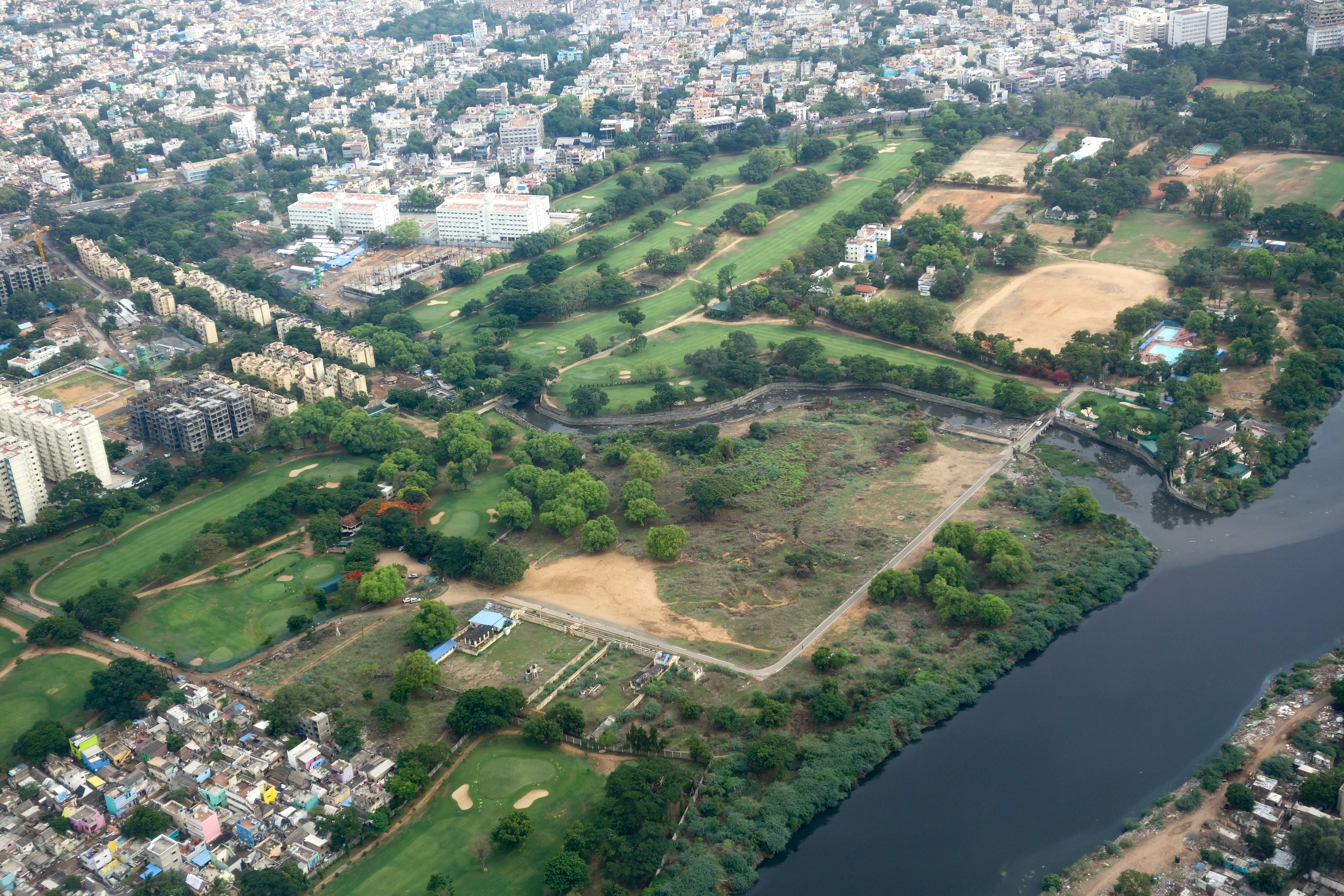
- Aerial view of the Cosmpolitan Club Golf Course, 2018
- Formation: 1873
- Type: Private club
- Headquarters: No.63 Anna Salai, Chennai 600 002
- Location: India
- Website: https://www.cosmopolitanclubchennai.com

The Cosmopolitan Club was established in 1873. It has one of the three 18-hole golf courses in Chennai, India.

It has bowling since 2010.

== See also ==
- Guindy Links
- Gymkhana Club
