= Madras Gymkhana Club =

Club in Chennai, India

- Location within Chennai
- 13.07207°N 80.27720°E

Club information
- Location: Chennai, India
- Established: 1886; 140 years ago
- Tota holes: 18
- Website: www.madrasgymkhana.com

The Madras Gymkhana Club (MGC) is an elite social club in Chennai, India, which was founded in 1884 to promote sports and social and cultural activities. It owns and operates one of Chennai's two 18-hole golf courses, one of Asia's oldest courses. Tamil Nadu Governor Surjit Singh Barnala published The Glory Years, a coffee-table book commemorating the club's 125th anniversary, in 2009.

== History ==
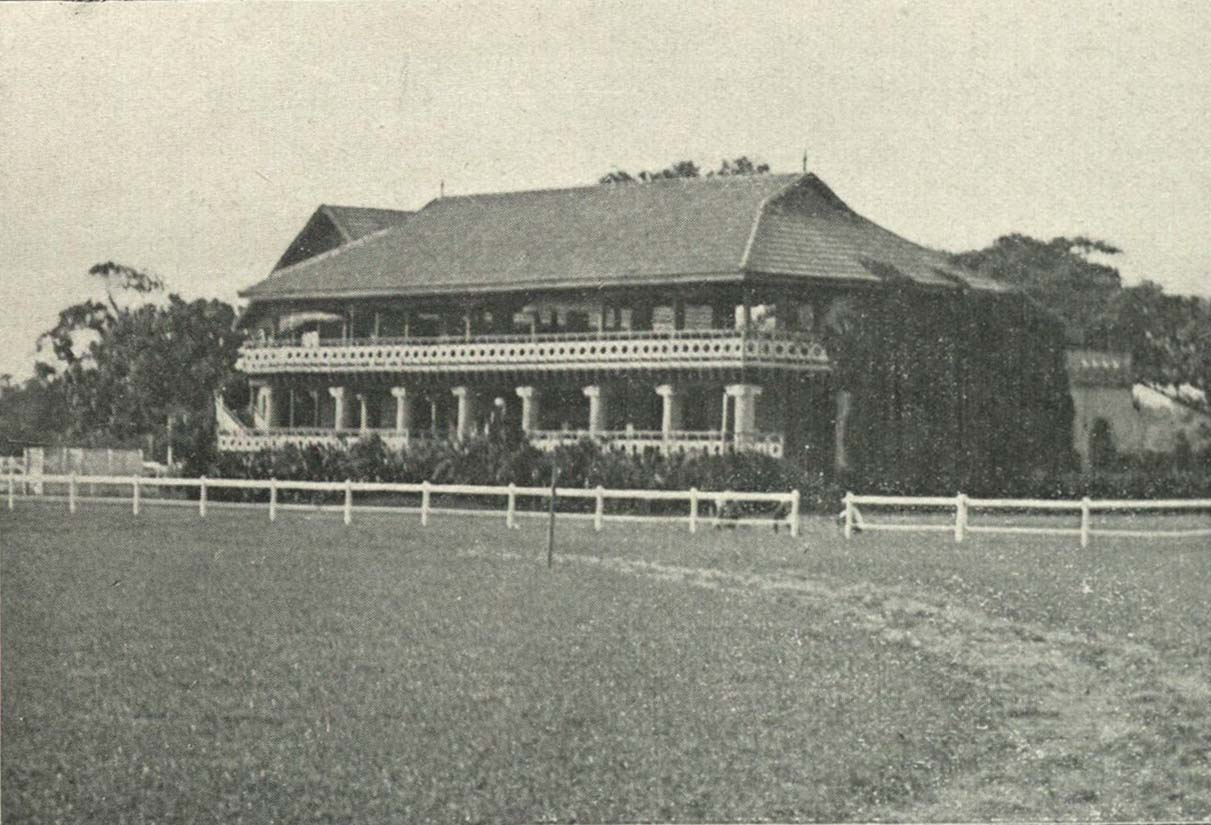
The club around 1905

The club was founded in April 1884. Early membership was restricted to garrison members, British executives and some upper-caste Indians. A tent was erected, and early activities included polo and pigsticking. The Raja of Venkatagiri donated a grandstand. In addition to playing polo, members began trap shooting and playing cards, rugby, tennis and golf. The South Indian rajas made donations for buildings, billiard tables and polo ponies.

The club's history is intertwined with the history of India. Although an ordinance expelled its German members at the onset of the First World War, the club later learned that most of the German settlers had already fled. Women were allowed to join the club as "Independent Lady Members" from 1971.

A bowling green was established, along with a ballroom in the paddock. Dance nights concluded with grand suppers, where dancers were photographed. A swimming pool was built, at which the American Olympic gold medalist Sammy Lee performed a diving exhibition. The club kitchen was upgraded with an ice-making plant, an ice–cream machine and freezer. A miniature golf course was built, and the bar was renovated.

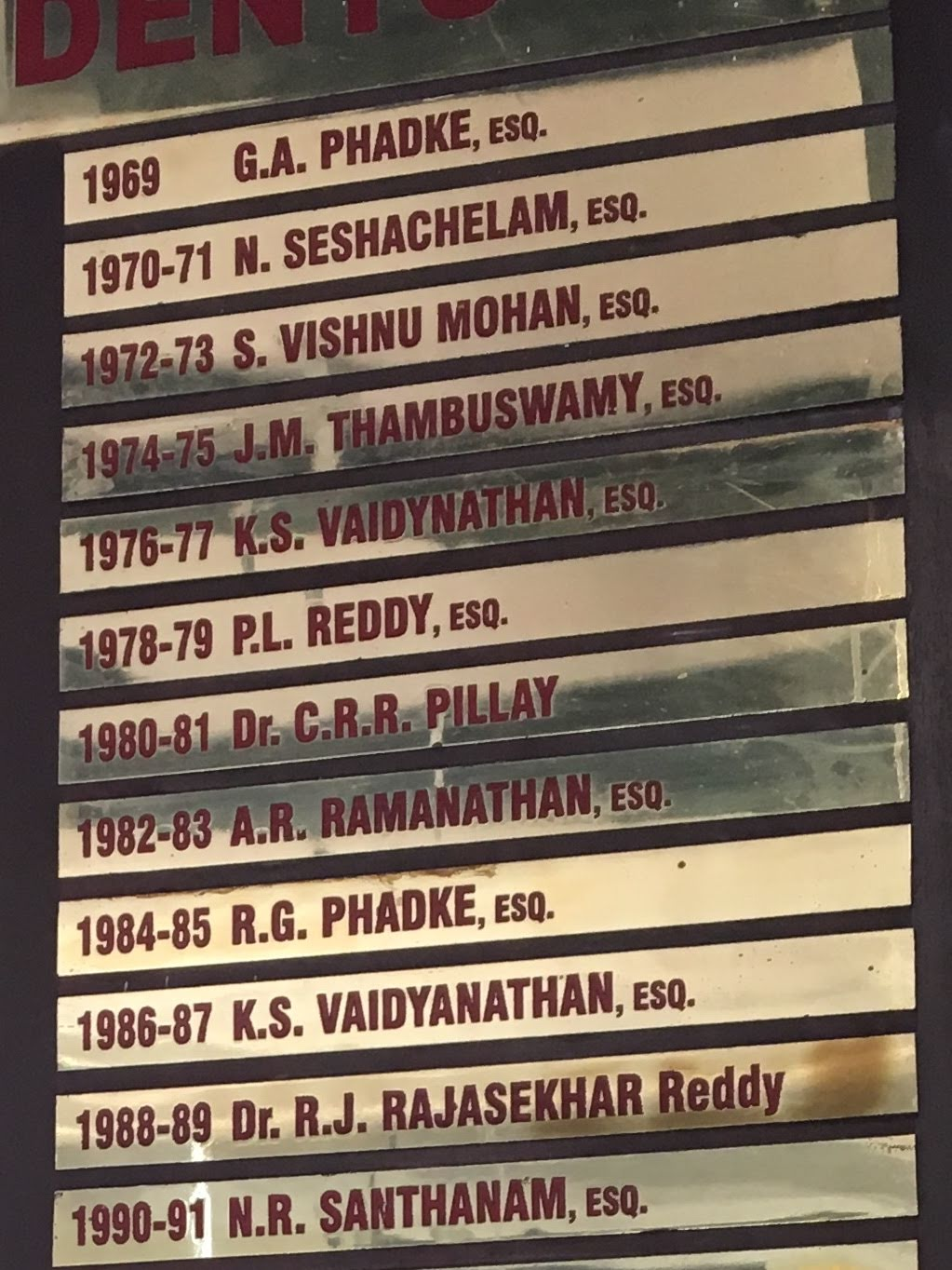
Plaque listing the club presidents

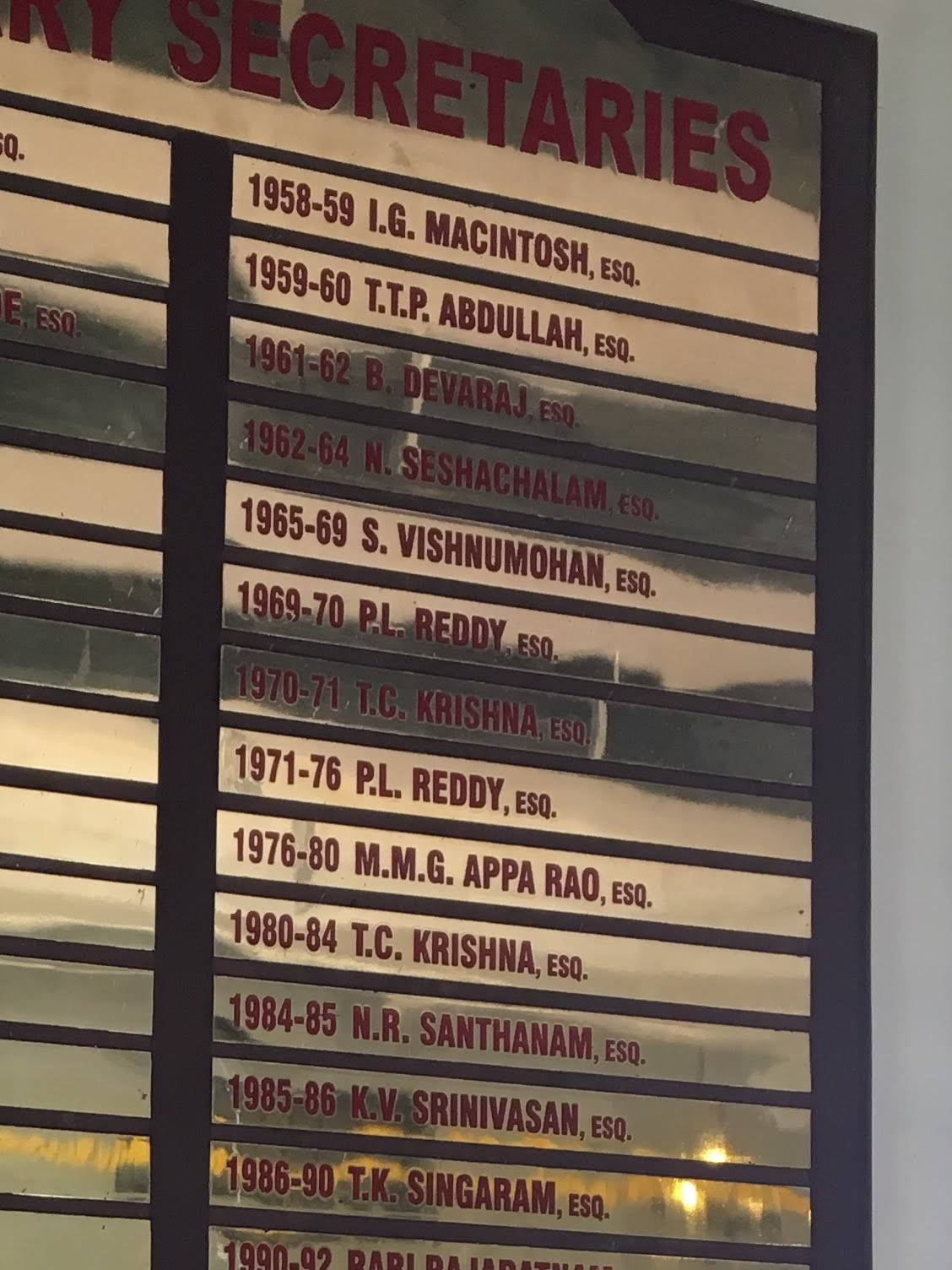
Plaque listing the club's honorary secretaries

Club presidents
Year	Name
1884	Lt. General C. B. Johnson
1885	Brig. Gen. Johnson
1886	J. A. Boyson
1887	H. McLeod
1888–1889	G. J. Smart
1890–1891	G. M. J Moore
1891–1892	T. Vanstrauveiy
1893–1898	G. M. J. Moore
1916–1921	J. H. Symons
1921–1923	L. H. Bewas
1924–1925	C. E. Odgers
1926	G. W. Chambers
1927	A. D. Charles
1928–1929	C. G. Alexander
1930	Owen Beasley
1931–32	G. A. Bambrioge
1933	J. W. Wyles
1934	M. A. Angus
1935	V. Mockett
1936	H. M. Small
1937	K. R. Simpson
1938	F. W. Gentle
1939–1940	C. A. F. Hingston Keobe
1941–1942	K. M. Kelso
1943	K. R. Simpson
1944–1945	G. Gill
1946–1947	S. Jackson
1948	R. J. J. Perry
1949	A. Sinclair Rose
1950–52	R. Wright
1953	K. H. Chambers
1954	R. Wright
1955	R. M. King
1956	H. I. Cormack
1957–58	K. M. Nanjappa
1959–60	K. Ramunni Menon
1961	J. V. S. Milne
1962	K. Ramunni Menon
1963–64	I. G. Macintosh
1965–66	V. S. Subramanian
1967–68	R. N. Manickam
1969	G. A. Phadke
1970–71	N. Seshachelam
1972–73	S. Vishnu Mohan
1974–75	J. M. Thambuswamy
1976–77	K. S. Vaidyanathan
1978–79	P. L. Reddy
1980–81	C. R. R. Pillay
1982–83	A. R. Ramanathan
1984–85	R. G. Phadke
1986–87	K.S. Vaidyanathan
1988–89	R. J. Rajasekhar
1990–91	N. R. Santhanam
1992–94	T. K. Singaram
1994–96	Rabi Rajaratnam
1997–98	B. Surender
1998–99	M. V. Raghunathan
1999–2001	K. J. Ramaswamy
2001–03	P. B. Santhanakrishnan
2003–05	C. S. Sivanandan
2005–06	V. V. Mohindra
2006–08	D. V. Seetharama Rao
2008–10	Arvind Ramarathnam
2010	N. A. Mirza (November)
2010–13	P. V. S. Vencatasubramaniam (acting)
2013–14	M. R. G. Apparao
2014–16	P. V. S. Vencatasubramaniam
2016–18	S. B. P. Anand Mohan
2018–2021	C. Venugopal
2021–2024	Mr.Sanjay Shroff
2024	Capt. S. Seshadri (Retd.)

Honorary secretaries
Year	Name
1884	G. S. Barister
1885 – May 1886	John F. Caldwell
May–December 1886	Seymour Biscoe
1887–1893	H. L. Ansted
1893–1894	H. S. Fraser
1894–1897	J. Campbell
1897–1898	N. Michael
1898–	Mr. C. Lane
1913–1915	Mr. Birley
1915–1916	J. Leask
1916–1921	A. McBulloch
1921–1922	D. Stewart
1922–1923	A. C. Rowdon
1923–24	F. C. Bishop
1924	J. M. Wilson
1925–1926	J. E. Cumming
1926–1929	A. W. Hutton
1929–1930	J. W. Wyles
1931–1932	A. C. Mercer
1932–1934	A. Feebles
1934 – March 1935	A. Mackenzie
March 1935 – January 1936	J. E. Inglis
February 1936 – 1938	W. B. Horrocks
1939–1940	G. L. Rossiter
1941–1944	J. Malvenam
1944–1945	R. J. Perry
1945–1946	F. W. Johnson
January – October 1947	W. I. Lavery
October 1947 – October 1948	G. L. Rossiter
October 1948 – March 1950	H. E. Hele
March – September 1950	N. S. Fridinger
September 1950 – January 1951	A. J. Martin
January – April 1951	H. H. Chambers
April 1951 – May 1954	N. S. Fridinger
1954–1955	J. Ashton
1956–1957	E. F. G. Keyser
January – February 1958	I. G. Macintosh
March – May 1958	J. V. S. Milne
June – August 1958	J. E. Peters
September 1958 – February 1959	I. G. Macintosh
March 1959 – 1960	Mr. T.T.P. Abdullah
1961 – September 1962	B. Devaraj
September – November 1962	L. V. Hermon
November 1962 – 1964	N. Seshachalam
1965–1969	S. Vishnumohan
1969–1970	P. L. Reddy
1970–1971	T. C. Krishna
1971–1976	P. L. Reddy
1976 – June 1980	M. M. G. Appa Rao
June 1980 – 1984	T. C. Krishna
1984 – September 1985	N. R. Santhanam
June – August 1986	K. V. Srinivasan
August 1986 – 1990	T. K. Singaram
1990–1992	Rabi Rajarathnam
1992–1995	M. V. Raghunathan
1995 – March 1997	K. P. Sashidar Rao
March 1997 – 1998	K. J. Ramaswamy
1999–2000	P. B. Santhanakrishnan
2000–2001	C. S. Sivanandan
2002–2003	V. V. Mohindra
2003–2004	D. V. Seetharama Rao
2004–2006	Arvind Ramarathnam
2006–2008	N. A. Mirza
2008–2010	P. V. S. Vencatasubramaniam
2010–2013	S. B. P. Anand Mohan
2013–2014	Giridhar Bail
2014–2016	A. P. Suresh Kumar
2016–2018	C. Venugopal
2018–2021	T. Gunasagaran
2021–2024	Mr. Ishwar Achanta
2024	Mr. Arvind C. Mehta

== Accommodations ==
The club has 15 rooms: three deluxe, six regular and six suites. Accommodations are provided for members of domestic and internationally affiliated clubs. All rooms are air-conditioned.

== Sports ==
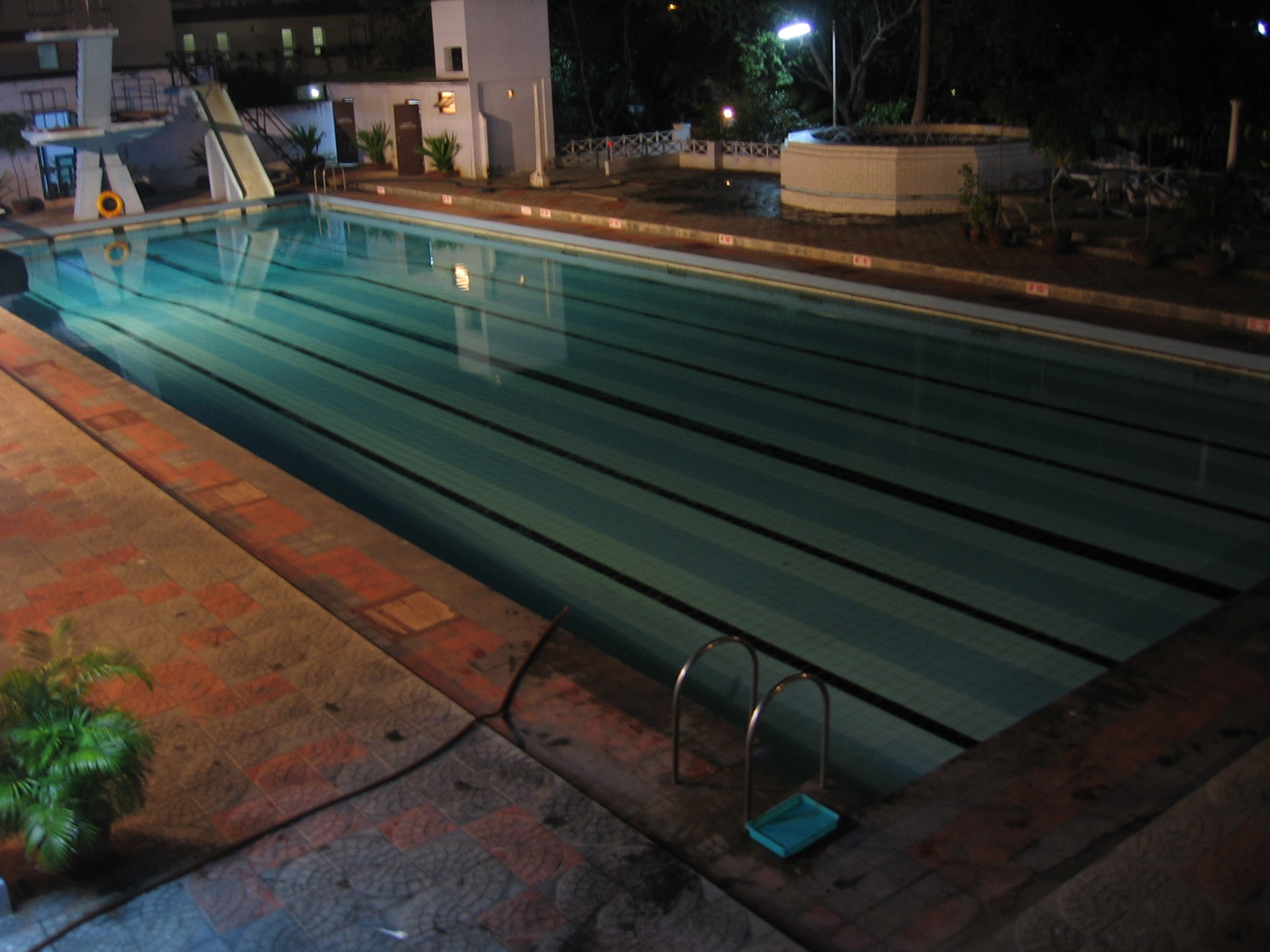
Swimming pool

The club has four lighted tennis courts, and Vijay Amritraj played there. It held the first South India Championships in 1889, and hosted for many years after. It has hosted several International Tennis Federation tournaments and the women's national championships. The club also has a gym, swimming pool, billiards, table tennis and a cards room.

== Other facilities ==
The MGC also has a sports shop, salon, beauty parlour, ice-cream parlour and book and DVD libraries.

== Guindy annexe ==
Originally on the Island Grounds, the golf course was moved to Guindy around 1887. It originally had nine holes before increasing to 14, 16 and 18 holes. Golf here was originally played off the browns; the transition to greens occurred during the 1980s. The Guindy course was known for its roughs, made challenging by the shifting wind. The 6,325/5765-yard course is within the 2,400-metre (1.5 mi) oval of the Guindy Race Course.

Ross Thompson was the first captain of the golf club. The first inter-club competition between the MGC and the Bangalore Golf Club was held in 1878, and it remains the world's oldest continuing competition between two golf clubs. In 2002, the golf club celebrated its 125th anniversary.

The par-70 course is about 6,258 yards off the regular tees. There are also ladies tees and a set of championship tee boxes. It has over 50 bunkers, most guarding the relatively-small greens.

== See also ==
- Guindy Links
- Cosmopolitan Club
