= ITC Grand Bharat =

- Location within Haryana
- Hotel chain: ITC Hotels, Palaces and Resorts

General information
- Location: India, Hasanpur, Tauru, Dist. Mewat 122 105, Haryana, India
- Coordinates: 28.3022°N 76.9746°E
- Management: ITC Hotels, Palaces and Resorts

Website
- Official Site

ITC Grand Bharat is a 5-star hotel and golf resort located in Gurgaon, New Delhi Capital Region, India, owned by ITC Hotels. It is approximately 45 kilometres (28 mi) from New Delhi. The resort is set along the northern end of the Aravalli Range, and covers the area of 1.2 square km. It is designed in the form of a ‘mandala’, or circle.

== History ==
ITC Hotels is a hotel chain in India. It is operated by ITC Limited, formerly known as India Tobacco Company, which expanded into the hotel industry in 1975 with the opening of its first hotel, the Chola Sheraton, now rebranded as My Fortune. Additionally, it holds the exclusive franchise of The Luxury Collection in India.

== Architecture ==
ITC Grand Bharat is outlined in the form of a ‘mandala'. Figurative of a celestial diagram, the structure represents completeness and the relation of life with the infinite. The resort is spread over an area of 1.2 square kilometers, and has a 100 luxury suites, 4 presidential villas, 4 dining options, a spa and a golf course.

== Golf course ==
The resort has a 27-hole golf course designed by renowned golfer and golf course designer Jack Nicklaus. This golf course is the first of its kind in South Asia, and offers three courses, each with nine holes – The Ridge Course, The Canyon Course, and The Valley Course. Classic Golf and Country Club is a member's club.
