= VUDA Park =

Park in Vishakhapatanam, India

VMRDA Park
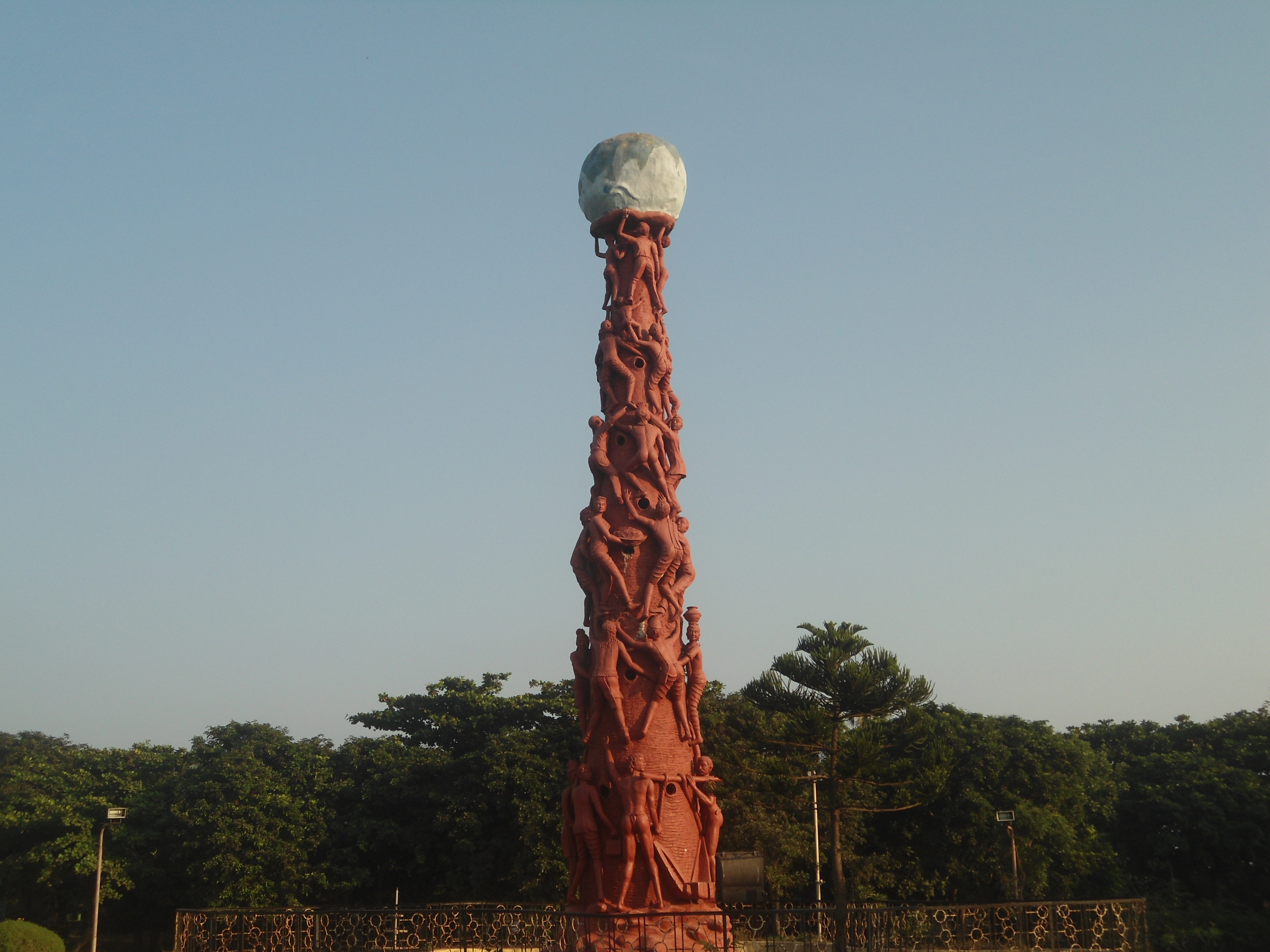
- Pylon at VMRDA Park
- Interactive map of VMRDA Park
- Type: Urban Park
- Location: Visakhapatnam, Andhra Pradesh, India
- Coordinates: 17.724080°N 83.339281°E
- Area: 55 acres (22 ha)
- Operator: Visakhapatnam Metropolitan Region Development Authority
- Status: Open all year

VUDA Park or VMRDA Park is an urban park located near RK Beach in Visakhapatnam, Andhra Pradesh, India. It is operated by the Visakhapatnam Metropolitan Region Development Authority (VMRDA). It contains gardens, a view of the Bay of Bengal, rides on horses and camels, and a skating rink. In December 2017, then-Chief Minister N. Chandrababu Naidu inaugurated a project to offer tourism by helicopter.

== See also ==
- Dwaraka Nagar
- Fintech Valley Vizag
