= Chandigarh Golf Club =

Golf club in Chandigarh, India

Chandigarh Golf Course, Chandigarh, India
- Location within Haryana Location within India
- 30°44′10″N 76°48′58″E

Club information
- Location: Sector-6, Chandigarh, India
- Established: 1962
- Operator: Chandigarh Golf Club
- Total holes: 18
- Website: The Chandigarh Golf Club
- Designed by: Peter Thomson
- Length: 7,202 yards

Chandigarh Golf Club, established in 1962, is a non-profit registered golf club located in Chandigarh, India. Located under the Sivalik Hills, the club features an 18-hole course spanning 6.5 kilometers (7,202 yards). Founded in 1962, the clubhouse was originally designed by Dharam Vira in 1969. The club has been home to professional golfers, including Jeev Milkha Singh.

== Flora and fauna of the surrounding area ==
The fairways of the golf course include large orchards inhabited by several kinds of birds, such as egrets, peacocks, and Blue Jay. The area is populated with plants like eucalyptus, adina cordifolia, Jamuns, and Kikar Orchard trees.

== Facilities ==
The golf club has a clubhouse, swimming pool, dining hall, golf shop and a gym for its members. In 1978, the course was expanded from 12 holes to 18. This new course was designed by four-time Open Championship winner, Peter Thomson.

== See also ==
- List of Golf Courses in India
- Dominence of Haryana in sports
- List of national parks of India
- Wildlife sanctuaries of India
