= Guindy Links =

Golf course in Chennai, India

The Guindy Links is one of the three 18-hole golf courses in Chennai, India. It was established in the late 19th century.

The golf course was shifted from Island Grounds to Guindy in 1887. It is of the 19 such courses in India. The course is home to about 40 tournaments every year, including the about 30 organised by the home club, the Gymkhana Club.

In October 2024, the state government came up with a plan to develop part of the golf course into an eco park. A petition against digging a part of the course was rejected by the high court in February 2025, as the land is not owned by the club. About 118 acres of the 160.86-acre race club land is being developed as an eco-park.

== See also ==
- Gymkhana Club
- Cosmopolitan Club
