= Hyderabad Golf Club =

Public golf course and heritage-linked sports venue in Telangana

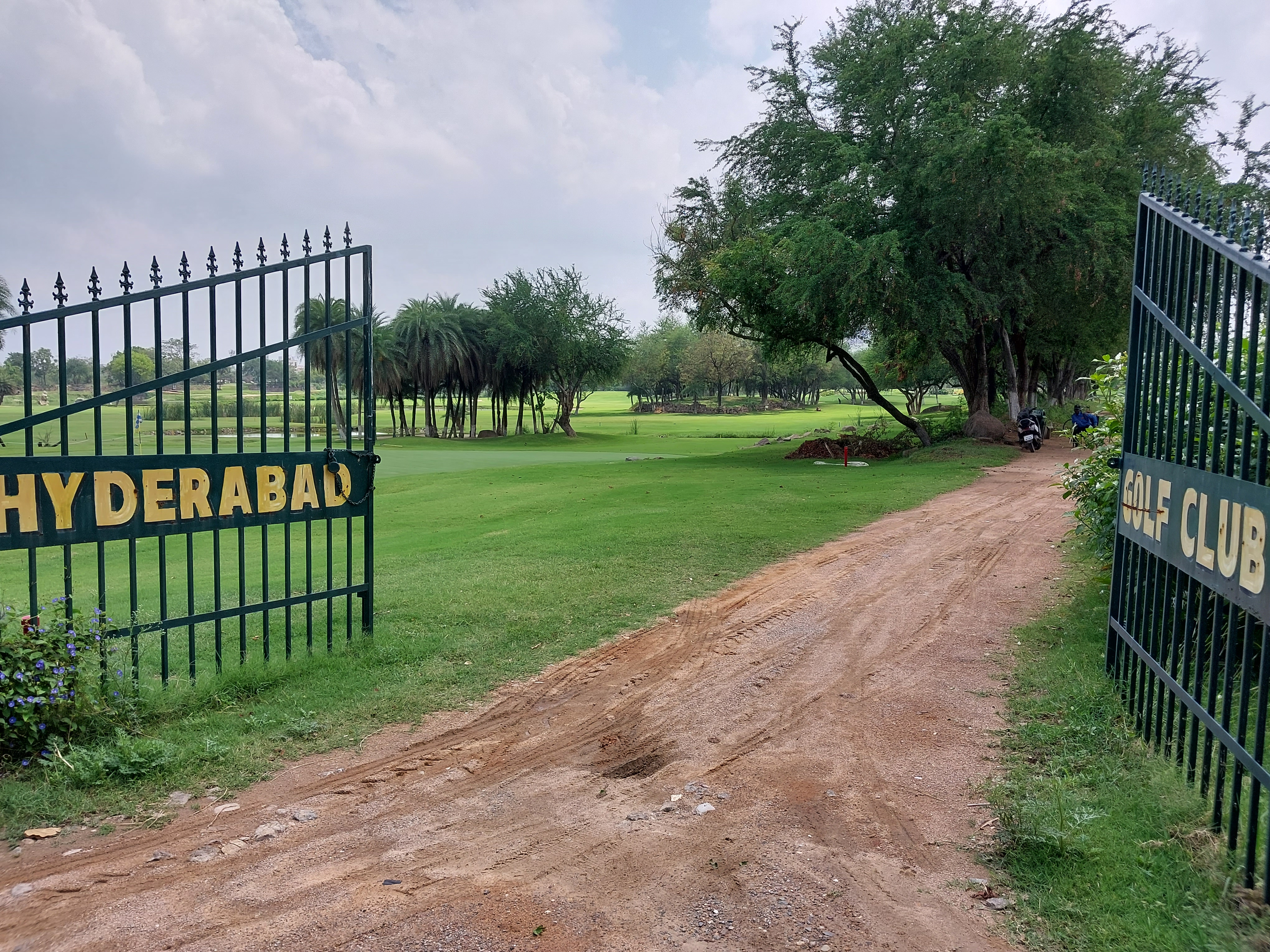
- Interactive map of Hyderabad Golf Club
- 17.3936°N 78.4043°E

Club information
- Location: Tolichowki, Hyderabad, Telangana
- Established: 1992; 34 years ago
- Type: Public Golf Course
- Owner: Hyderabad Golf Association (HGA)
- Operator: Hyderabad Golf Association (HGA)
- Total holes: 18
- Tournaments: Golconda Masters
- Website: www.hyderabadgolfclub.co.in
- Par: 70–71
- Length: 5900–6100 yards (varies by setup)

Hyderabad Golf Club (HGC) is an 18-hole public golf course located within and around the historic Golconda Fort and Naya Qila region of Hyderabad, Telangana. It is operated by the Hyderabad Golf Association (HGA), a non-profit sports body established in 1992. The course is known for its unique integration of golf fairways with heritage ramparts, water bodies, rock formations and old fort structures.

== Hyderabad Golf Association ==
The Hyderabad Golf Association (HGA) was formed in 1992 to promote golf in Telangana and to establish an international-standard public golf course in Hyderabad. The organisation is non-profit and is funded through member subscriptions. Its stated objectives include promoting the sport of golf, conducting tournaments, and training players through structured development programmes.

== History ==
Plans for a public golf course were initiated around 2001. Land was earmarked in the Naya Qila and surrounding Golconda region, including areas historically recorded as Jamali Gunta and Satam Cheruvu. Parts of the land lay inside the protected monument zone of the Golconda Fort; therefore, permissions were obtained from the Archaeological Survey of India to develop the course and establish golf training facilities. The complete 18-hole course was finished in August 2014.

== Location ==
Hyderabad Golf Club is situated near Tolichowki, adjacent to the Qutb Shahi Tombs complex and within the extended precinct of Naya Qila and Golconda Fort. Its layout incorporates elevation changes, heritage stone walls, and natural rock hills, creating a distinctive landscape for golfers and visitors.

== Overview ==
The club promotes itself as a public golf facility open to residents of Hyderabad and Secunderabad as well as visiting national and international golfers. HGA states that the development of the course has contributed to tourism and supported significant employment opportunities for the surrounding community.

== Facilities ==
The club features an 18-hole championship course with length varying between 5900 and 6100 yards depending on tee configuration, typically played as par-70 or par-71. Facilities available at the club include:

- Floodlit driving range and practice greens
- Golf Academy for coaching and training
- Club and trolley rental services
- Pro-shop
- Clubhouse with dining and change-room facilities

== Tournaments ==
Hyderabad Golf Club hosts amateur and professional events, including the Golconda Masters on the national golf circuit. Its heritage surroundings and course layout have gained attention for combining competitive play with historical ambience.

== Controversy ==
As parts of the golf course lie within a heritage-protected precinct, the project has been subject to public discussion. Heritage researchers and conservation proponents have expressed concerns regarding visitor access and preservation of archaeological structures within Naya Qila. The Hyderabad Golf Association and state authorities have stated that development was undertaken with required permissions and that the course supports tourism, public recreation and reuse of previously under-maintained land. Dialogue between heritage conservation interests and sports development continues as the course remains operational.

== Recent developments ==
In 2024, the club announced redevelopment planning for course routing, turf upgrades, and enhanced training facilities to support tournament-level play and improve heritage integration over the long term.
