= Trivandrum Golf Club =

Nine-hole golf course in Kerala, India

Coordinates: 8.52247°N 76.96616°E

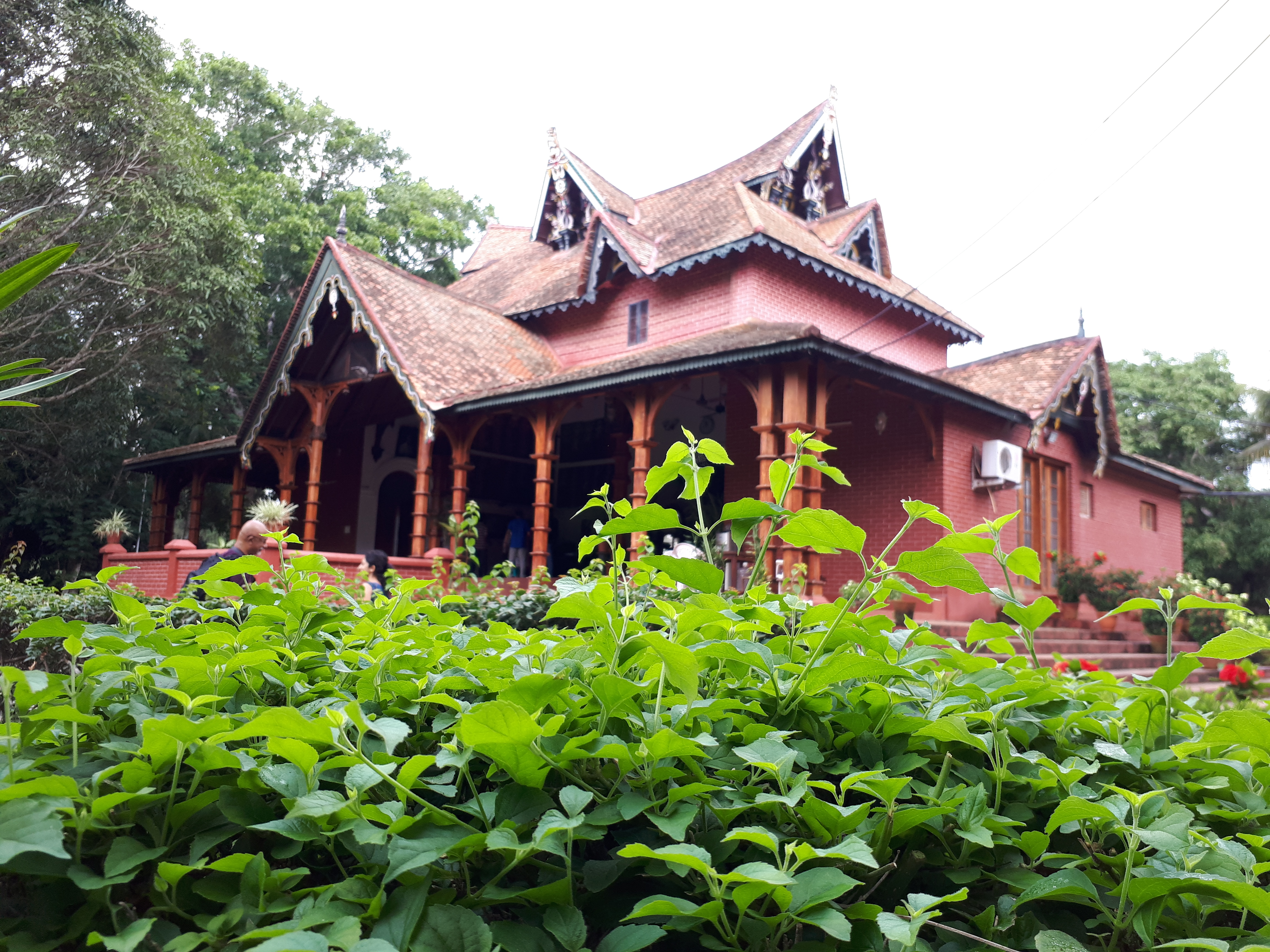
Second golf club of India

National Golf Academy and Trivandrum Golf Club is a nine-hole golf course located at Thiruvananthapuram city in the Indian state of Kerala.

== Area ==
The course is spread over 25.38 acres (10.27 ha). It was started around the 1850s during the days of the late Maharajah Sreemoolam Tirunal. The golf course here is one of the oldest in the country and is more than 150 years old.

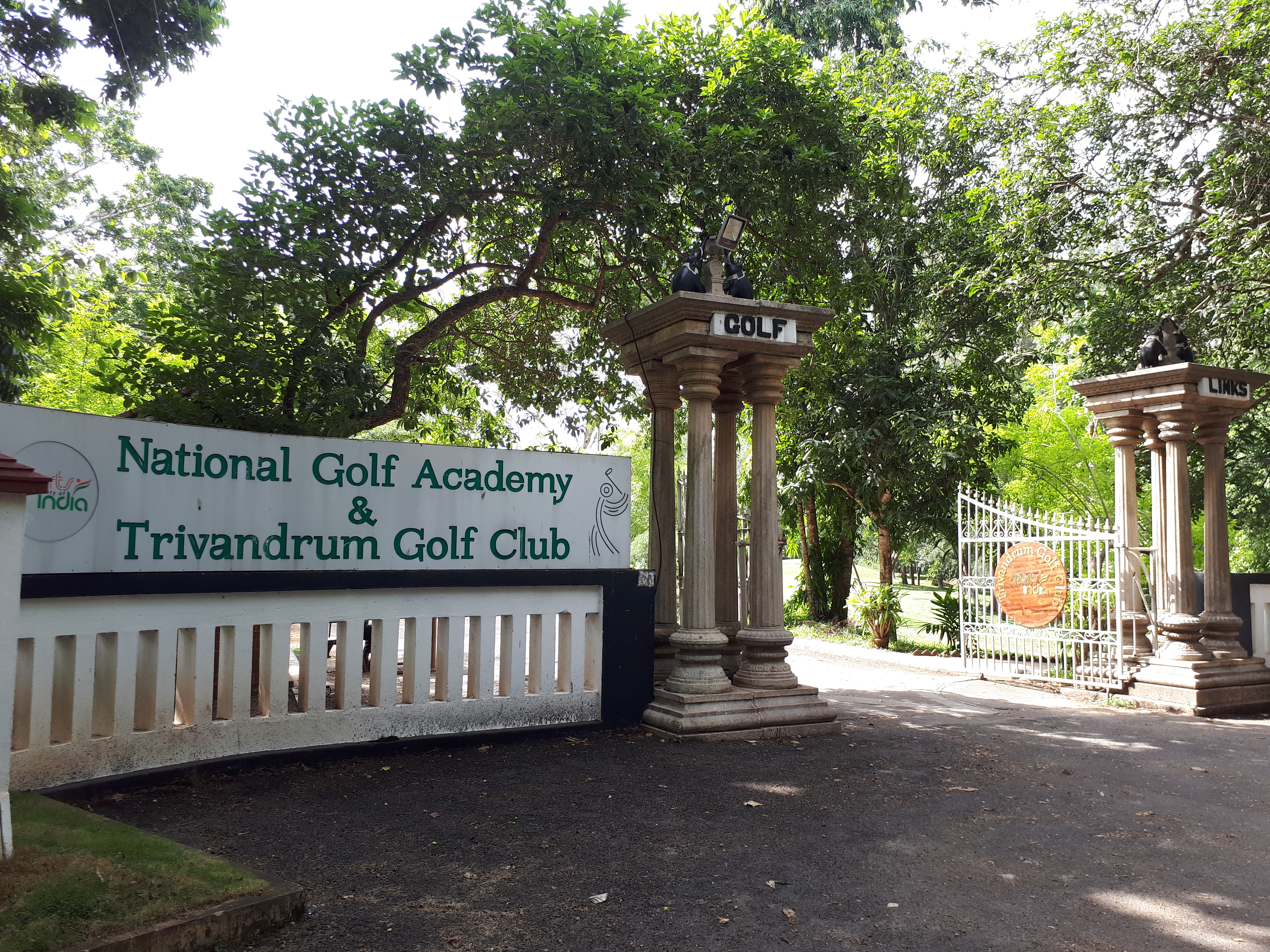
Entrance to the Trivandrum Golf club
