= List of defunct amusement parks =

The following is a list of amusement parks and theme parks that have been closed, demolished, or abandoned:

Parks which were constructed or partially constructed but are closed to the public are sometimes referred to by the abbreviation SBNO: Standing But Not Operating.

== Africa ==
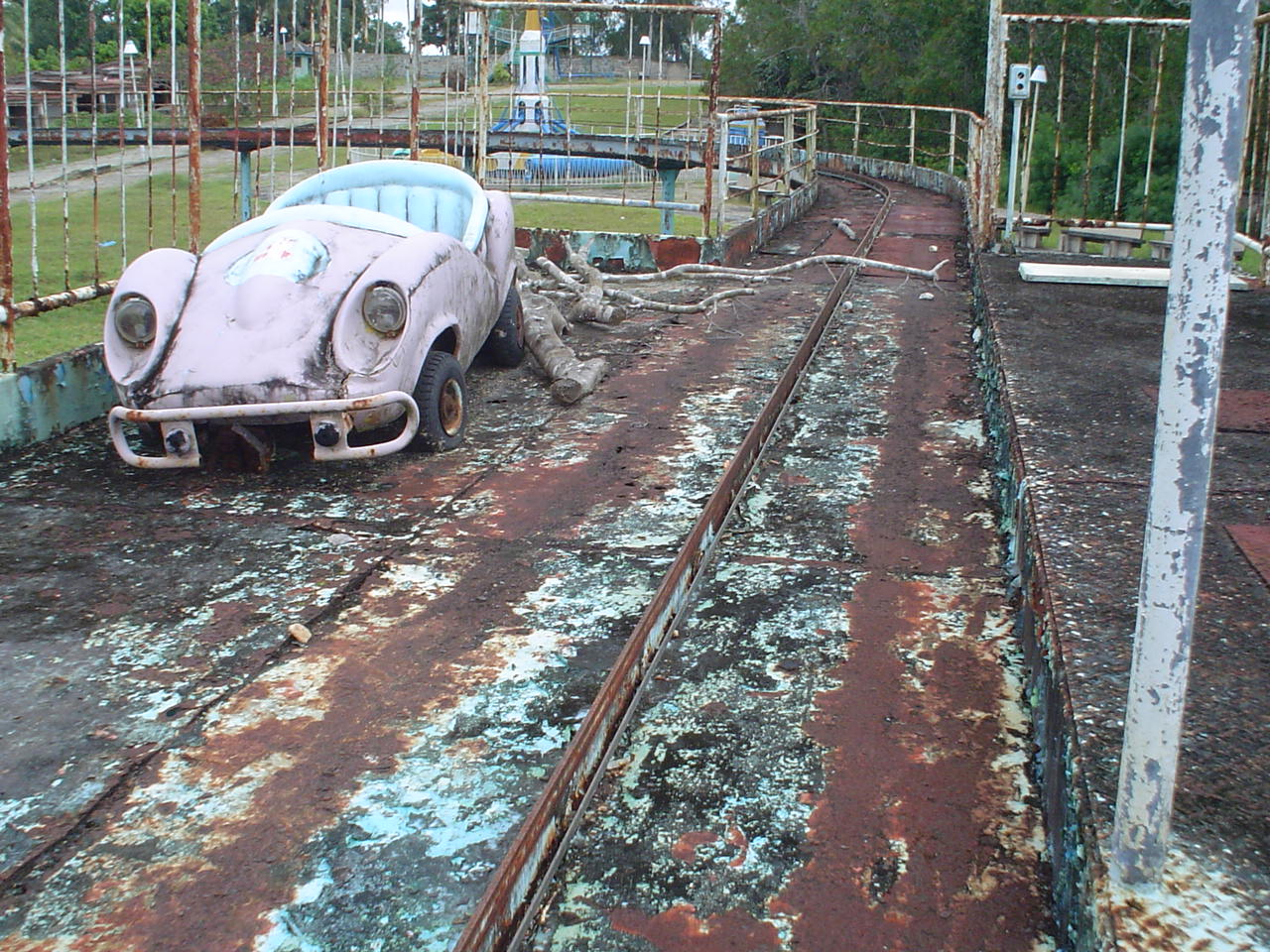
Umoja Children's Park, Tanzania

=== Egypt ===
- Luna Park, Cairo (1911–1915)

=== Rwanda ===
- Kigali Park, Rwanda (????–????)

=== South Africa ===
- Ratanga Junction, Cape Town (1998–2018)

=== Tanzania ===
- Umoja Children's Park, (unknown), Chake-Chake, Zanzibar (????–????)

== Asia ==
=== Afghanistan ===
- Bokhdi Amusement Park, Kabul (????–2021)

=== Mainland China ===
- Children's Amusement Park, Seven Star Park, Guilin (????–????)
- Dolphin Bay Dream Water Park, Pingyang County (????–????)
- Grand World Scenic Park (1995–2009)
- Honey Lake Entertainment City, Shenzhen (1985–2011)
- Minsk World (2000–2016)
- Splendid World Fantasy Land, Jiujiang (2014–2018)
- Wonderland Amusement Park, Chenzhuang Village, Nankou Town, Changping District (????–????)
- Holland Amusement Site, Taiwan Village, Kolunga District (????–????)

=== Hong Kong SAR ===
- Kai Tak Amusement Park, New Kowloon (1965–1982)
- Lai Chi Kok Amusement Park, Lai Chi Kok (1949–1997)
- Luna Park, Hong Kong, North Point (1949–1954)
- Tiger Balm Garden, Wan Chai (1935–1998)

=== India ===
- Agartala Amusement Park, Agartala (????–2022)
- Appu Ghar, New Delhi (1984–2008)
- Dash n Splash, Chennai (1995–2012)
- EsselWorld, Mumbai (1989–2022)

=== Indonesia ===
- Hibisc Fantasy, Bogor (2024–2025)
- Kampung Gajah, Bandung (2010–2017)
- Circus Waterpark, Bali (2011–2020)
- Pandawa Water World, Surakarta (2007–2024)
- Snowbay, TMII, Jakarta (2009–2022)
- Ciputra Waterpark, Surabaya (2005–2021)
- Taman Remaja Surabaya, Surabaya (1971–2018)
- Waterboom Bukit Jati, Bali (2015–2022)
- Waterbom, Pantai Indah Kapuk, Jakarta (2007–2020)
- Wonderia, Semarang (2006–2017)

=== Iran ===
- Shahr-e Bazi, Tehran (formerly Luna Park, Tehran) (1970–2007)

=== Israel ===
- Kings City, Eilat (2005–2015)
- Lormad Amusement Park, Eilat (????-????)

=== Japan ===
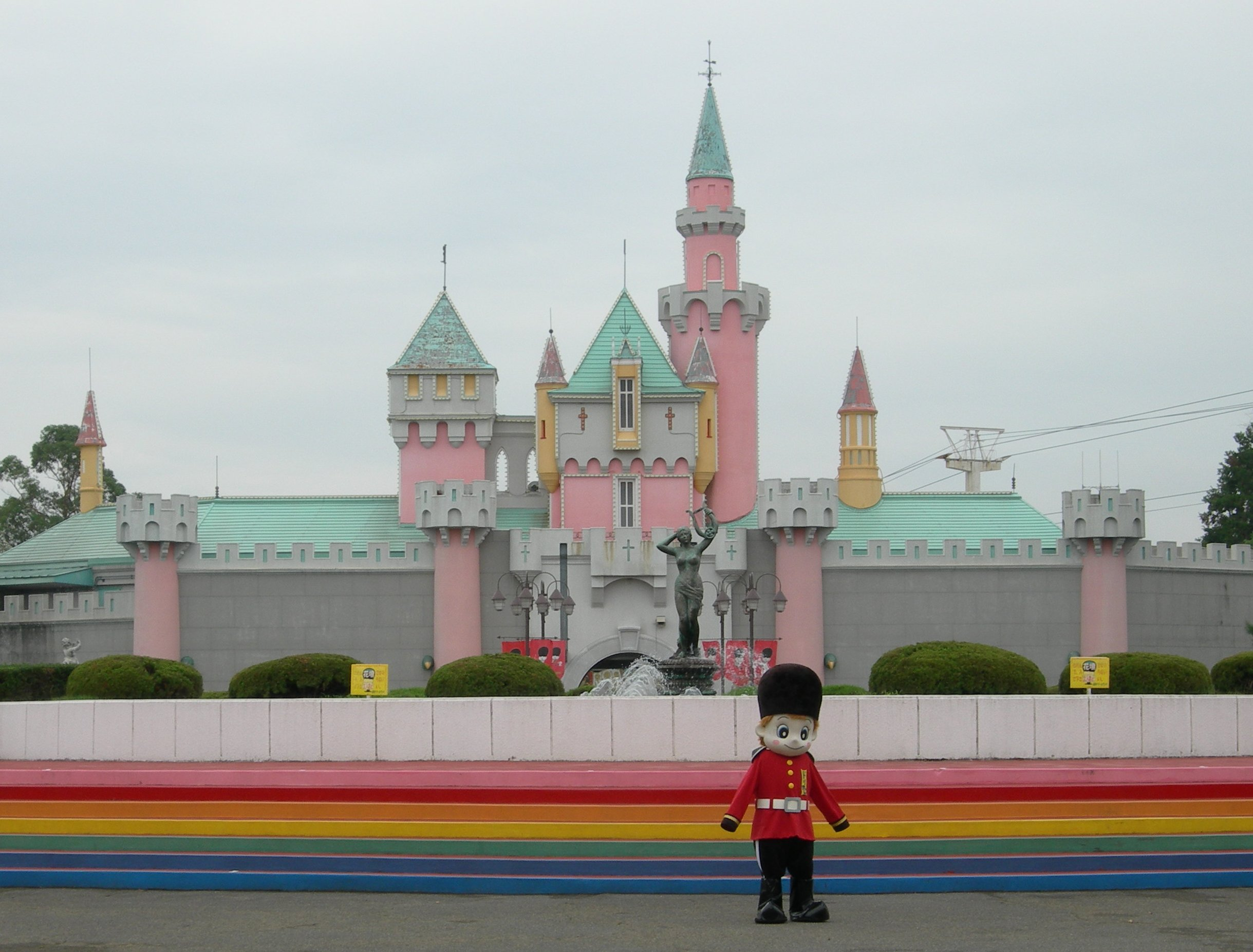
The castle at Nara Dreamland in Nara, Nara Prefecture, Japan

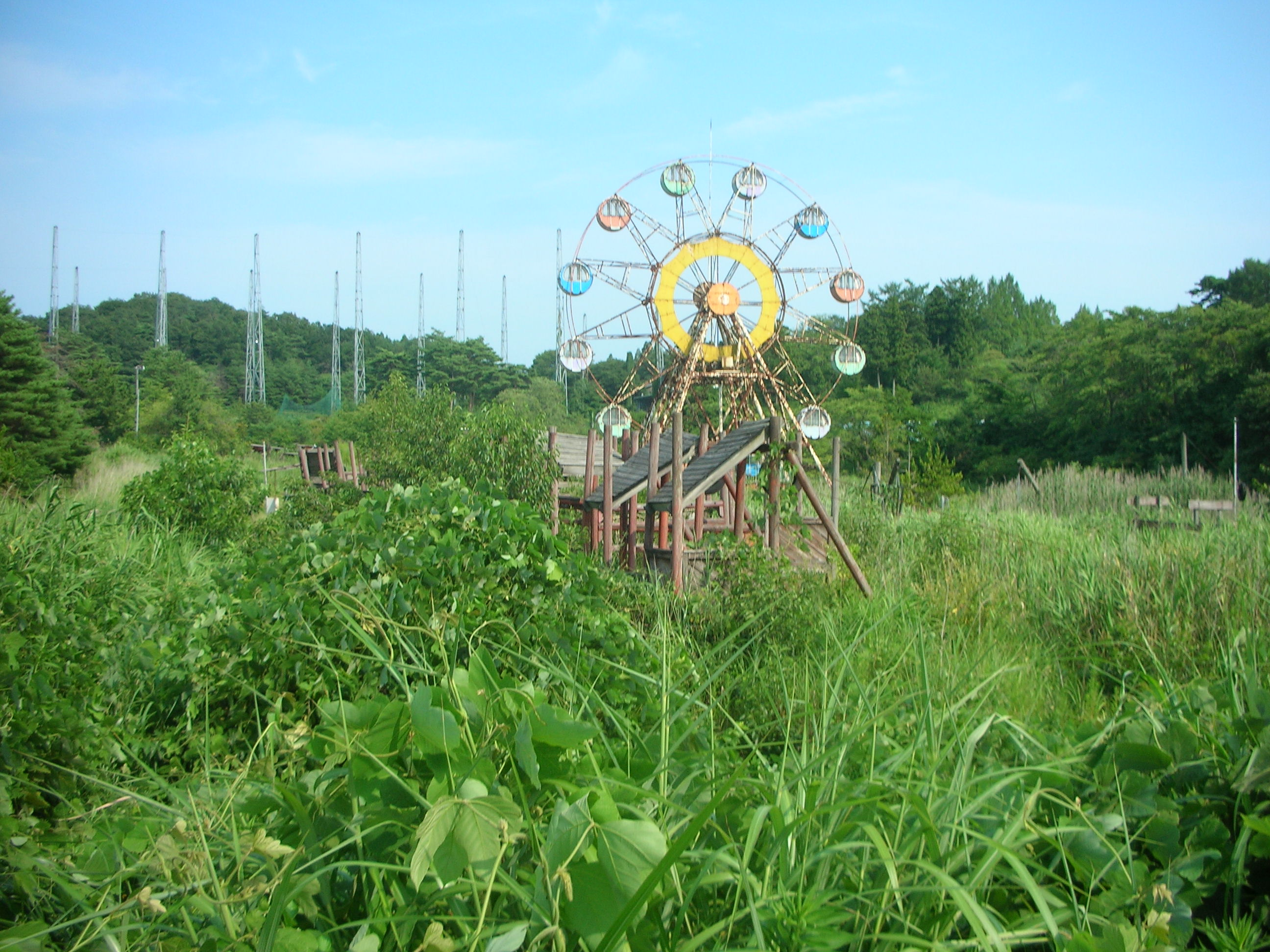
Kejonuma Leisure Land in Osaki, Miyagi

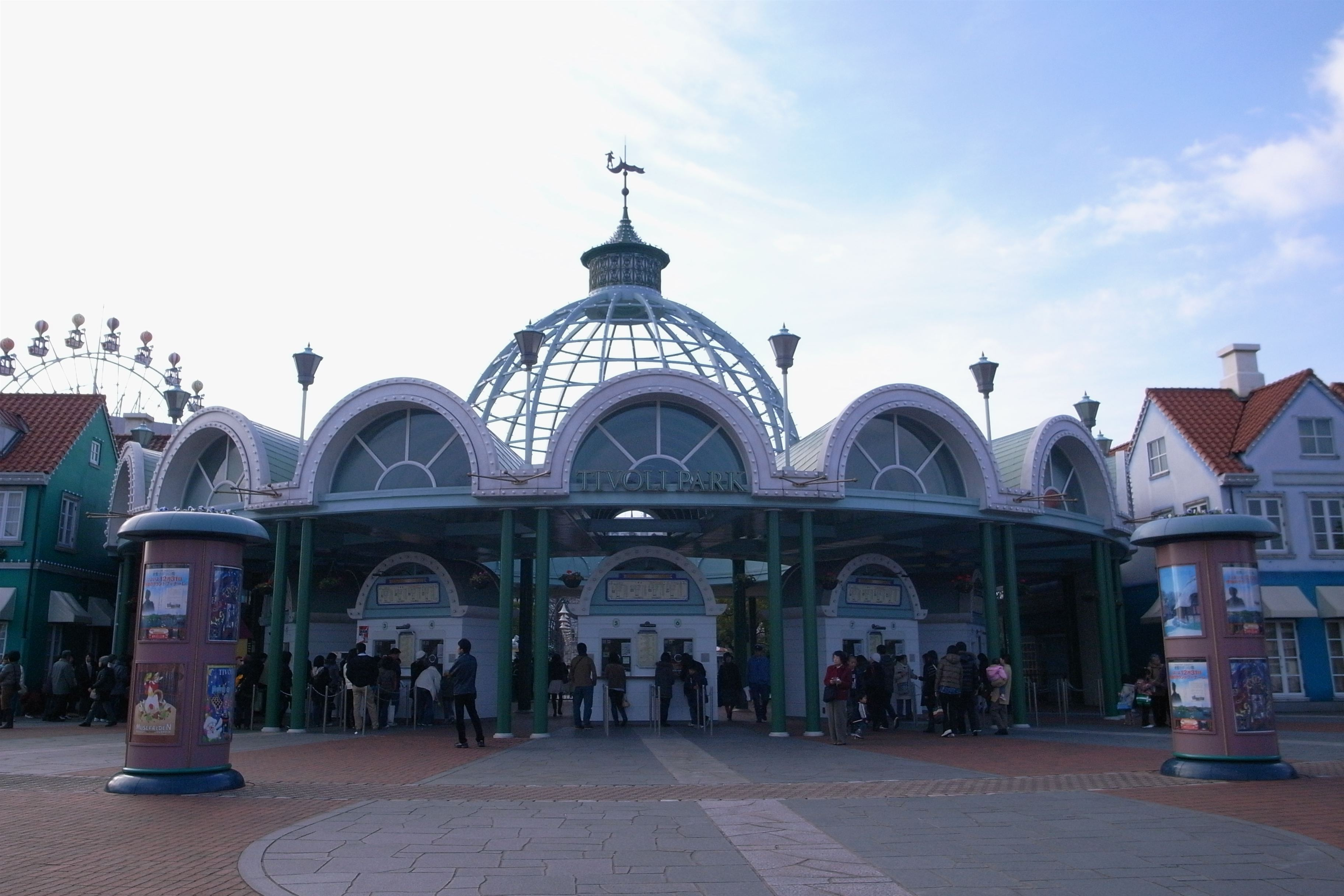
Entrance of Kurashiki Tivoli Park

- China Park of Heaven Tenkaen (天華園), Noboribetsu, Hokkaido (1992–1999)
- Expoland, Osaka, Shinsekai (1970–2007)
- Festivalgate (1997–2007)
- Gulliver's Kingdom, Kawaguchi-machi, Yamanashi Prefecture (1998–2001)
- Kappapia, Takasaki Kannon-yama Recreational Park, Takasaki, Gunma Prefecture (1961–2003)
- Kejonuma Leisure Land (1979–2000)
- Koga Family Land, Shiga Prefecture (????–1988)
- Kurashiki Tivoli Park, Kurashiki, Okayama Prefecture (1997–2008) [in Japanese]
- Luna Park, Osaka, Shinsekai (1912–1923)
- Luna Park, Tokyo, Asakusa (1910–1911)
- Mukaigaoka Yūen, Kawasaki, Kanagawa Prefecture (1927–2002) [in Japanese]
- Nagasaki Holland Village, Nagasaki (1983–2001) [in Japanese]
- Nara Dreamland, Nara, Nara Prefecture (1961–2006)
- Niigata Russian Village, Agano, Niigata Prefecture (1993–2002)
- Orbi (2013–2020)
- Orbi Osaka (2016–2018)
- Poképark, Nagoya (2005)
- Seagaia Ocean Dome (1993–2007)
- Space World (1990–2018)
- Sports World Izunagaoka (1989–1996)
- Takakonuma Greenland (High Swamp Greenland), Fukushima (1973–1999)
- Takarazuka Family Land, Takarazuka, Hyōgo Prefecture (1960–2003) [in Japanese]
- Tama Tech (1961–2009)
- Tokyo One Piece Tower (2015–2020)
- Toshimaen (1926–2020)
- Western Village (1975–2007)
- Wild Blue Yokohama (1992–2001)
- Wonder Eggs (1992–2000)
- Yamaguchi New Zealand Park (1990–2005)
- Yokohama Dreamland, Yokohama, Kanagawa Prefecture (1964–2002)

=== Kuwait ===
- Kuwait Entertainment City (1984–2016)
- Showbiz Kuwait (1984–1991)

=== Malaysia ===
- MAPS Perak (2017–2020)
- Mimaland (1975–1994)
- Desa Water Park, Kuala Lumpur (2000–2016)
- Wet World Wild Adventure Park Batu Feringgi, Penang (2013–2014)
- Sand City Water Park Tanah Merah, Kelantan (????–????)
- Johore Safari World (????–????)
- SamaWorld, Genting Highlands (????–????)

=== North Korea ===
- Pyongyang Folklore Park (2012–2016)

=== Palestine ===
- Crazy Water Park (2010)

=== Philippines ===
- Boom Na Boom Carnival (1987–1994)
- Fiesta Carnival (1975–2005)
- KidZania Manila (2015–2020)
- Old Nayong Pilipino (1970–2002)
- Fantasyland (????–????) (closed due to financial issues)
- Toys and Gift Fair (1976–1991)

=== Qatar ===
- Aladdin's Kingdom (1994–2004)

=== Saudi Arabia ===
- Al Hokair Land (2002–2021)
- Atallah Happy Land Park (1986-2025)

=== Singapore ===
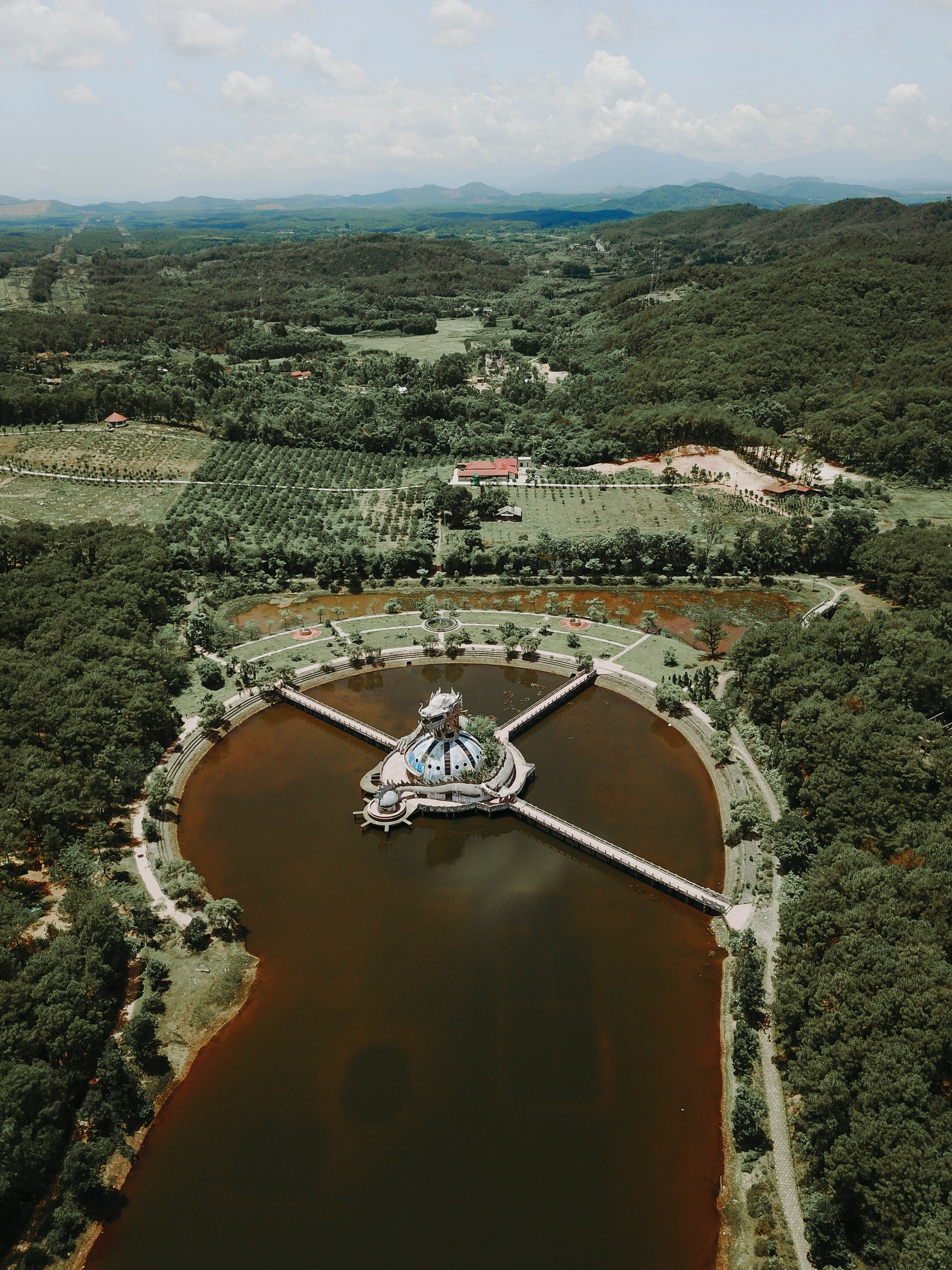
Ho Thuy Tien water park, Vietnam (2017)

- Adventure Asia Park (????–2007)
- Big Splash (1977–2016)
- Escape Theme Park (2000–2011)
- Fantasy Island (1994–2001)
- Gay World Amusement Park (1937–2000)
- Great World Amusement Park (1929–1978)
- New World Amusement Park (1923–1987)
- Tang Dynasty City (1992–1999)
- Wonderworld Amusement Park at Kallang (1959–1988)

=== South Korea ===
- Dae Jang Geum Theme Park (2004–2014)
- Okpo Land (1996–1999)
- Yongma Land (1980–2011)

=== Taiwan ===
- Baihe Taiwan Film and TV Town, Tainan
- Encore's Garden, Dakeng (1981–1999)
- Katoli World, Dakeng (1983–1999)
- Formosa Fun Coast, Bali, New Taipei City (1989–2015)
- Taiwan Studio City (1990–1999)
- Poképark, Taipei (2006)

=== Thailand ===
- Dan Neramit, Bangkok (1976–2000)
- Happy Land, Bangkok (????–1977)

=== United Arab Emirates ===
- Bollywood Park Dubai, Dubai (2016–2023)

=== Vietnam ===
- Hồ Thủy Tiên, Hương Thủy (2004–2007)
- Saigon Water Park (1997–2006)

== Europe ==
=== Austria ===
- No Name City, Wöllersdorf (2001–2008)

=== Azerbaijan ===
TBA

=== Belgium ===
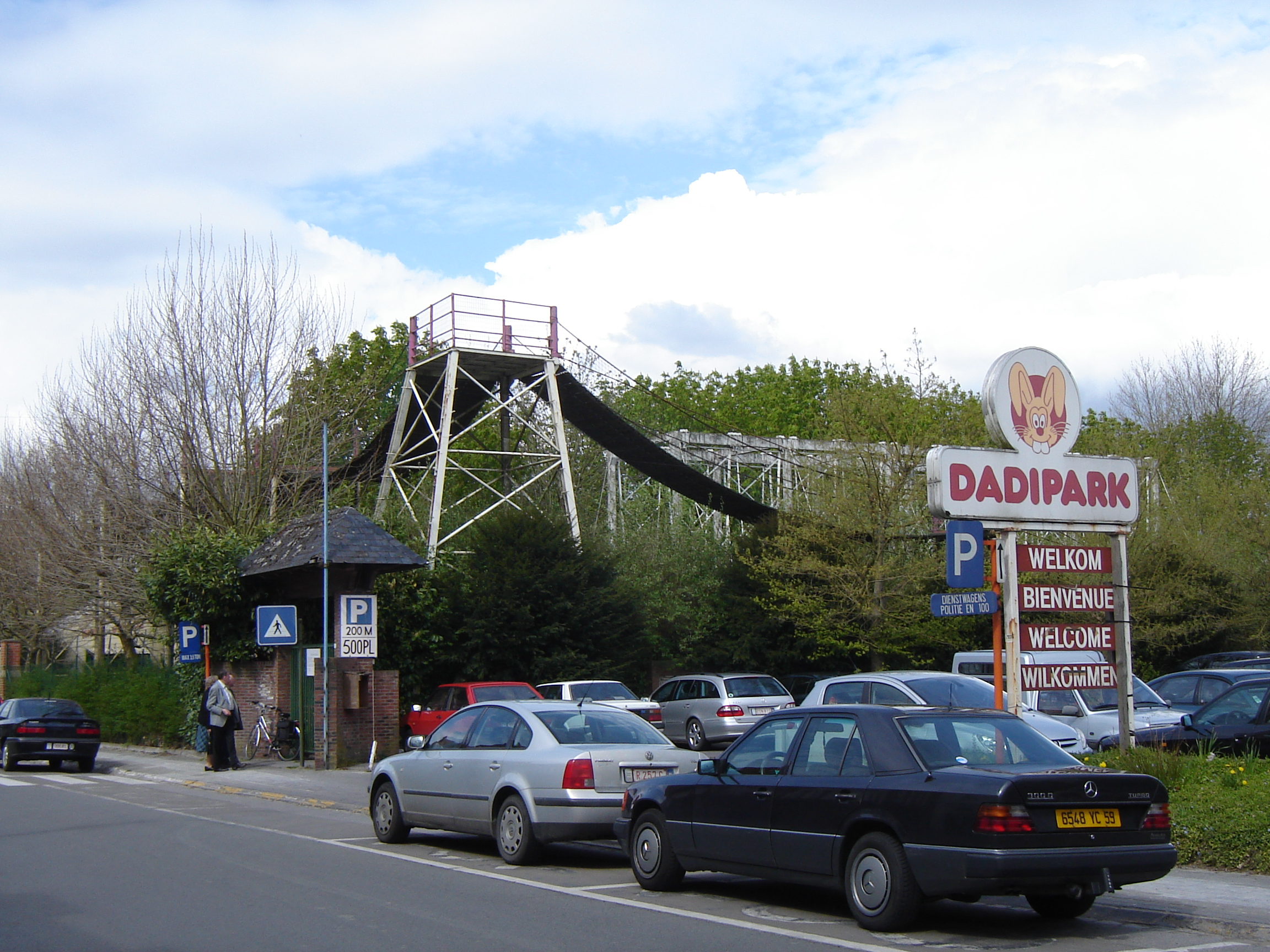
Dadipark

- Dadipark, Dadizele (1950–2002)
- Land van Ooit, Tongeren (????–????)
- Lunapark Antwerp, Antwerp (????–????)
- Lunapark Antwerp 30, Antwerp (1930)

=== Bulgaria ===
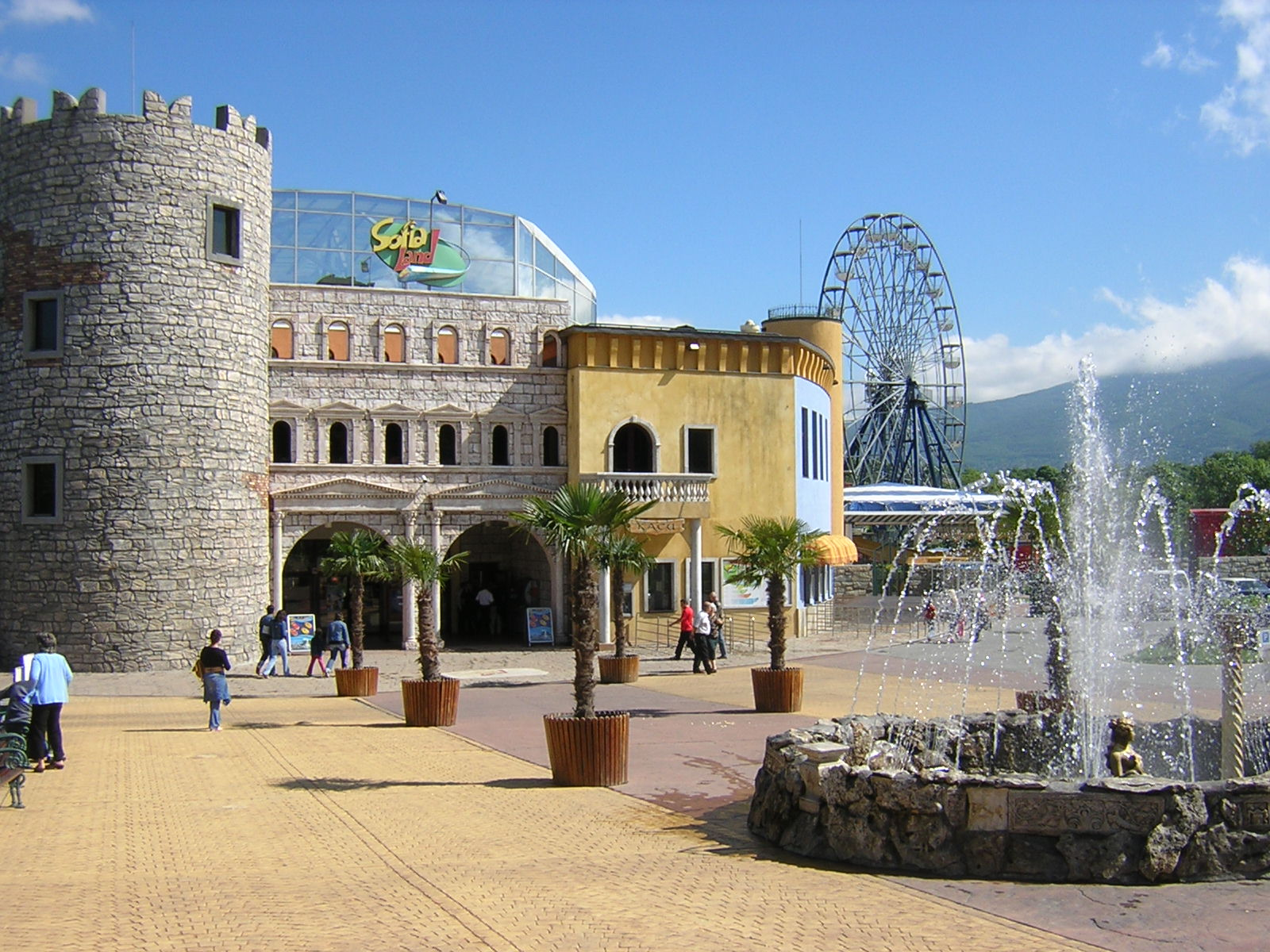
The main entrance to Sofia Land, Sofia, Bulgaria

- Sofia Land, Sofia (2002–2006)

=== Denmark ===
- Fun Park Fyn, Aarup (1980–2006)
- Karolinelund (1946–2010)
- Sommerland Syd, Tinglev (1984–2012)
- Velling Koller Fairytale Gardens, Brørup (1962–1980s) – now used as a camping site

=== Estonia ===
- Kadrioru Lõbustuspark, Tallinn (19??–2002)
- Rocca al Mare tivoli, Tallinn (1996–2006)

=== Finland ===
- Ålandsparken, Mariehamn, Åland (1984–2002)
- Planet FunFun, Kerava (1991–1995)
- Wasalandia, Vaasa (1988–2015)

=== France ===
- Archéodrome de Beaune (????–????)
- Jardin de Tivoli, Paris (1795–1842)
- Le Bioscope (2006–2012)
- Lillom, Lomme (1985–1987)
- Luna Park, Paris (1909–1931)
- Magic-City (1900–1934)
- Mirapolis, Cergy-Pontoise (1987–1991)
- Nautiparc, Chambéry, Savoie (1986–1995)
- Parc de la Toison d'Or, Dijon, Burgundy (1990–1993) [in French]
- Planète Magique, Paris (1989–1991) [in French]
- Toon's Land, Cap d'Agde, Languedoc Roussillon (????–????)
- La vallée des Peaux Rouges, Région parisienne (????–????)
- Zygofolis, Nice, Provence-Alpes-Côte d'Azur (1987–1991) [in French]

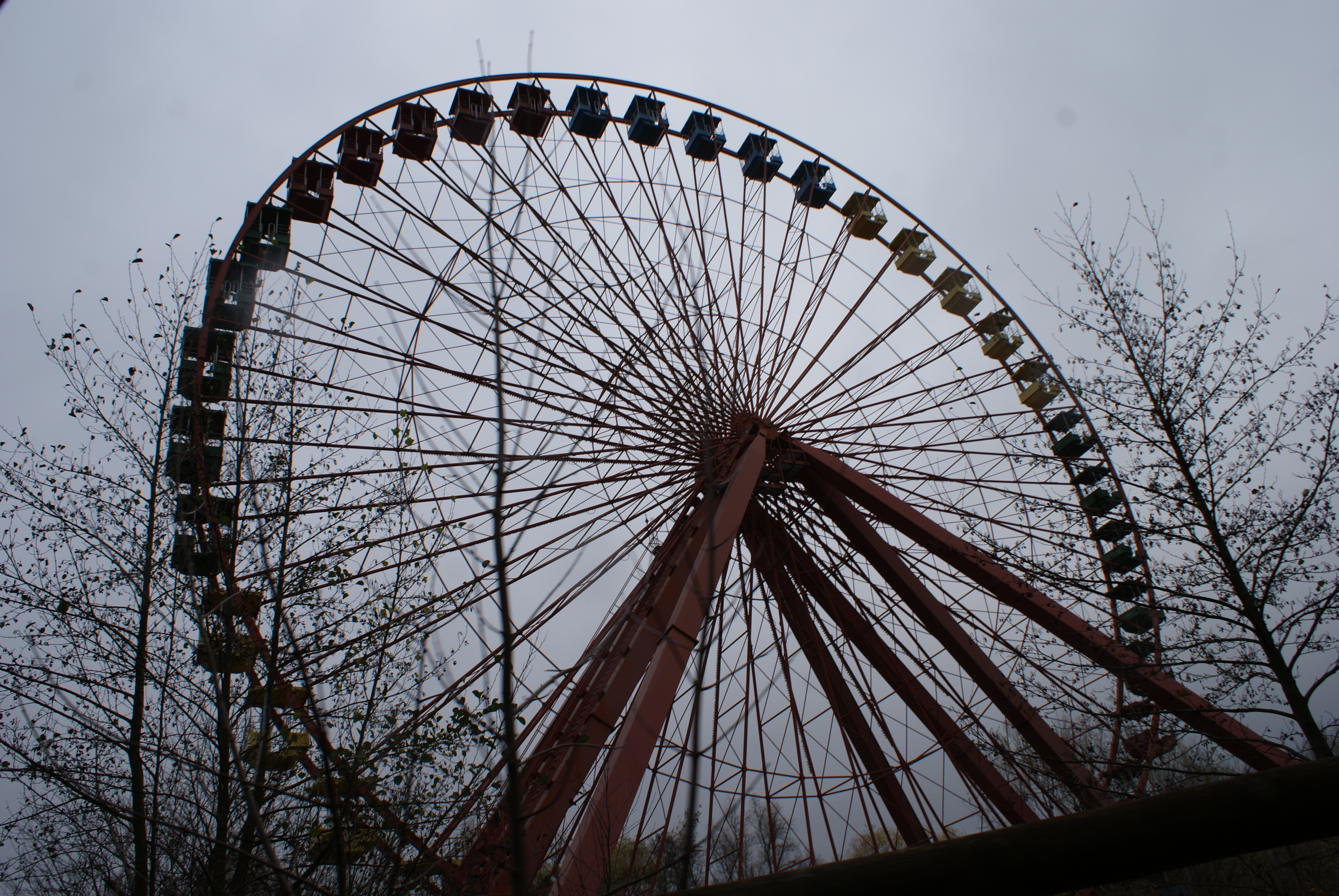
The defunct ferris wheel at Spreepark, Berlin, Germany

=== Germany ===
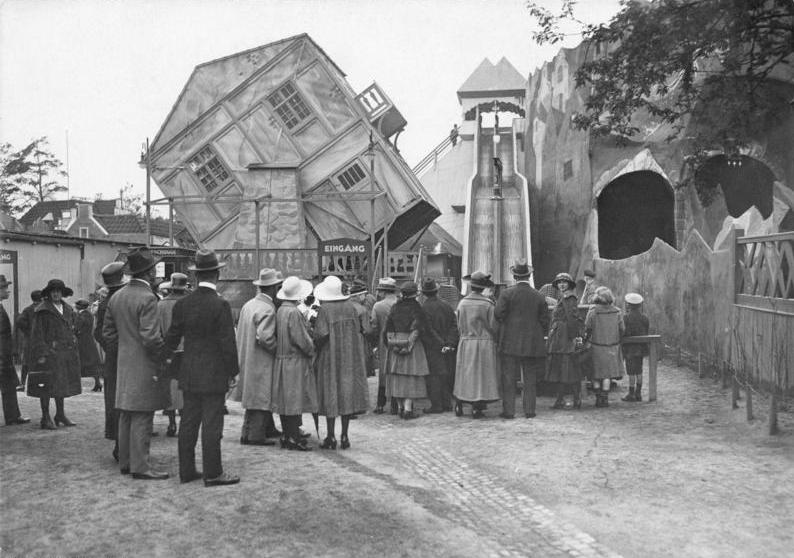
The Swivel House in 1923, Lunapark, Berlin, Germany

- Alpamare Bad Tölz, Bad Tölz (1970–2015)
- Blub, Berlin (1985–2002)
- Das Neue Traumland (originally Traumlandpark), Bottrop (1977–1991)
- Fränkisches Wunderland, Plech (1976–2013)
- Freizeitpark Kirchhorst, Isernhagen (1971–1986) [in German]
- Luna Luna (1987)
- Luna Park, Berlin (1909–1933)
- Luna Park Hamburg-Altona (1913, 1917–1923)
- Luna Park, Leipzig (1911–1932)
- No Name City, Poing (1987 - 1995) [in German]
- Safariland, Groß-Gerau-Wallerstädten (1970–1985) [in German]
- Schwabylon, Munich (1973–1974) [in German]
- Sea Life Abenteuer Park, Oberhausen (1996–2016) [in German]
- Space Park, Bremen (2004)
- Spreepark (originally Kulturpark Plänterwald), Berlin (1969–2002)
- Tivoli Berlin, Kreuzberg, Berlin (1829–1856)

=== Hungary ===
- Budapesti Vidámpark (18??–2013)
- Dunaújvárosi Vidám Park, Dunaújváros (1952–1993)

=== Ireland ===
- Butlin's Mosney, Gormanston, County Meath (1948–2000)
- Celtworld, Tramore, County Waterford (1992–1995)

=== Italy ===
- Aquapark, Zambrone (1989–2007)
- Miragica, Molfetta (2009–2018)

=== Lithuania ===
- Vaikų Pasaulis, Elektrėnai (1986–2013)

=== Netherlands ===
- Het Land van Ooit, Drunen (1989–2007) [in Dutch]
- Yumble, Roermond (????–????)
- Verkeerspark Assen, Assen (????–????)
- De Vluchtheuvel, Norg (????–????)

=== Portugal ===
- Aqualine, Altura (????–????)
- Aquaparque, Lisboa (1989–1993)
- Aquaparque Teimoso, Figueira da Foz (????–2018)
- Atlântico Park, Loulé (????–2006)
- Beja Aquática, Beja (????–1992)
- Feira Popular de Lisboa, Lisboa (1943–2003)
- FunCenter, Lisboa (1997–2013)
- Ondaparque, Trafaria (1988–1996)

=== Russia ===
- Luna Park, St. Petersburg (1912–1924)
- Transvaal Park (2002–2004)

=== Spain ===
- Casino de la Arrabassada, Barcelona (1910)
- Europa Park, Benidorm (????–????)
- Lagosur, Leganés (1989–1992)
- Mediterráneo Park, Benidorm (1995–2002)
- Parque de Atracciones de Montjuic, Barcelona (1966–1998)
- Parque de Atracciones de Vizcaya, Galdakao (1974–1990)
- Plutón Park, Vigo (1997–2002)

=== Sweden ===
- Kabe sommarland (1984–1995)

=== Turkey ===
- Tatilya (1996–2006)
- Wonderland Eurasia (2019–2020)

=== Ukraine ===
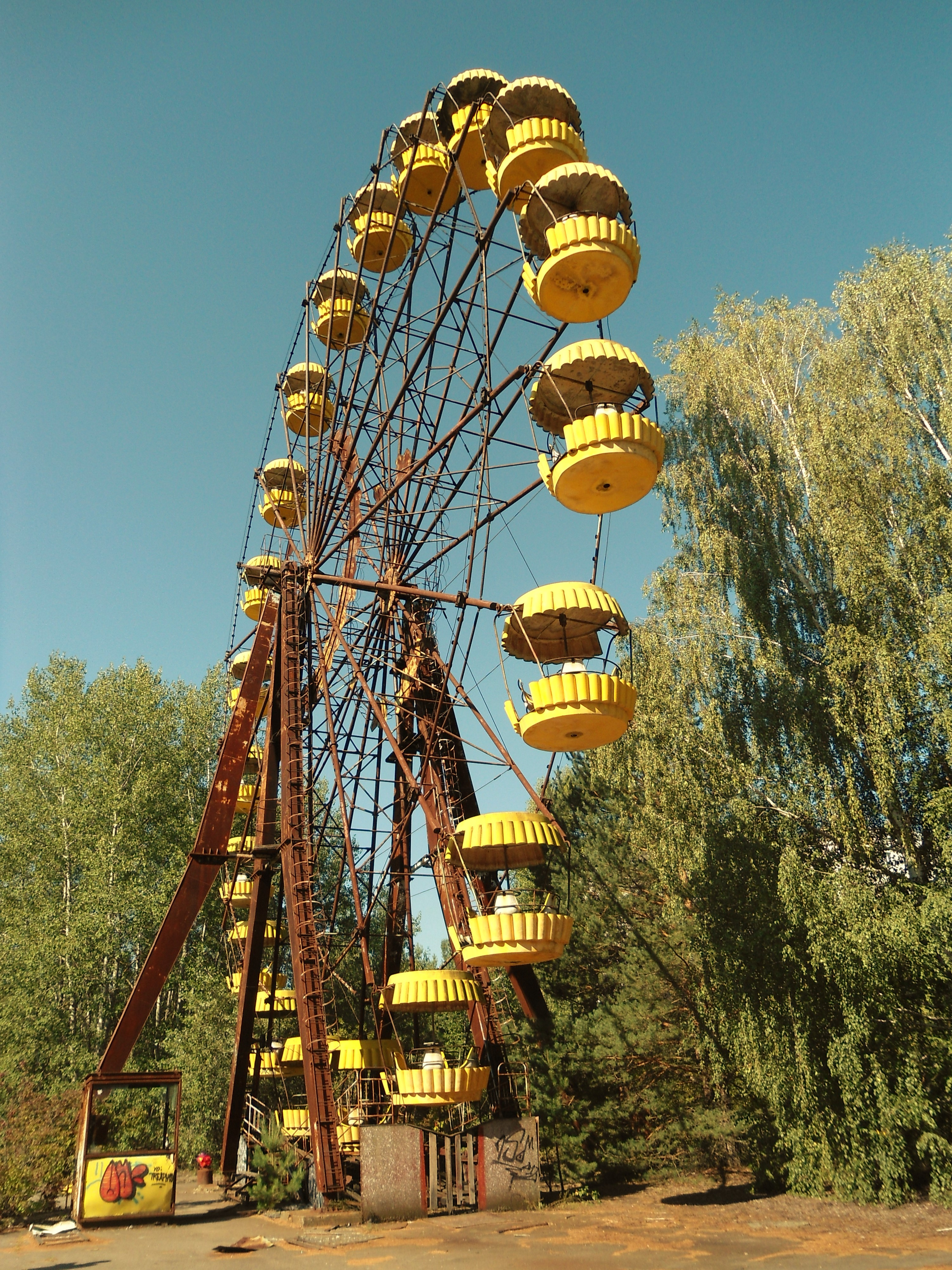
The Ferris wheel at Pripyat amusement park in Ukraine, still stands abandoned

- Pripyat amusement park, Pripyat (1986) – was supposed to open on 1 May 1986 for the May Day celebrations, but was abandoned after the Chernobyl disaster on 26 April 1986. The park's Ferris wheel, which is currently standing but not operating, serves as a poignant reminder of the massive human effect of the disaster.

=== United Kingdom ===
==== England ====
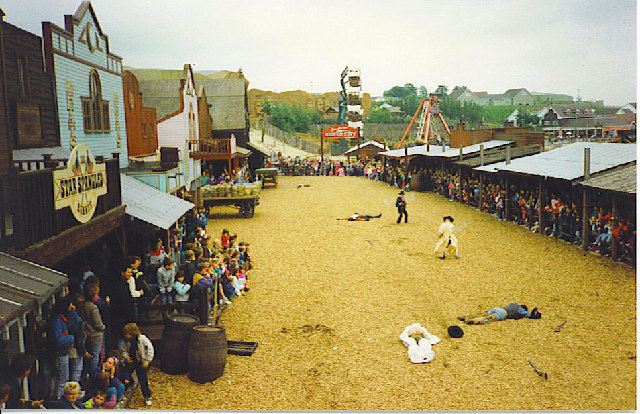
American Adventure in 1991, Derbyshire, England

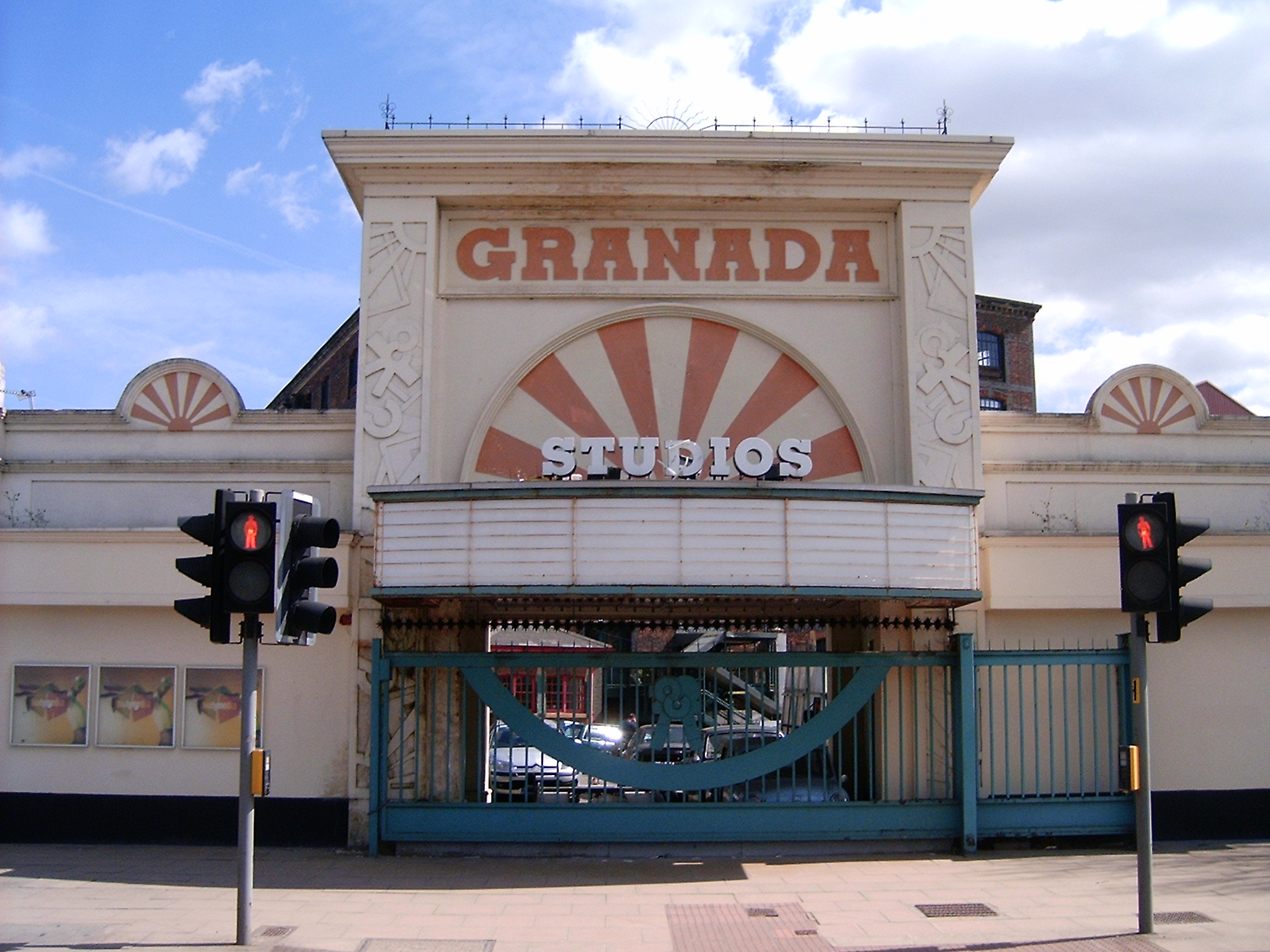
The disused entrance for the Granada Studios Tour, Manchester, England

- The American Adventure Theme Park, Derbyshire (1987–2007)
- Arena Funfair, Morecambe, Lancashire (????–????)
- Battersea Funfair, Battersea, London (1951–1974)
- Belle Vue Zoological Gardens, Manchester (1836–1987)
- Brocklands Adventure Park, Cornwall (1977–2007)
- Camelot Theme Park, Lancashire (1983–2012)
- Children's Corner (1961–2004)
- Crinkley Bottom (or Blobbyland), Cricket St Thomas, Somerset (1994–1998)
- Dickens World (2007–2016)
- Dobwalls Adventure Park, Cornwall (1970–2006)
- Dinosaur Land (????–2009)
- Flambards Theme Park, Cornwall (1976–2024)
- Frontierland, Morecambe, Lancashire (1909–1999)
- Granada Studios Tour, Manchester (1988–1999)
- Killarney Springs, Cornwall (1990–2006)
- Kinderland, Scarborough, North Yorkshire (1985–2007)
- Lapland New Forest (2008)
- The New Metroland formerly known as Metroland, Metro Centre, Gateshead (1988–2008)
- Once Upon a Time, Ilfracombe, Devon (1990–2005)
- Peter Pan's Playground (1951–2010)
- Pleasure Island Family Theme Park, Cleethorpes, Lincolnshire (1993–2016)
- Seaburn Fun Park, Sunderland (1985–2000)
- SegaWorld London (1996–1999)
- Tucktonia, Dorset (1976–1986)
- Wet N Wild, North Shields (1993–2020)

==== Isle of Man ====
- White City, Onchan, Isle of Man (1908–1985)

==== Scotland ====
- Leith Waterworld (1992–2012)
- Loudoun Castle, Ayrshire (1995–2010)
- Marine Gardens, Edinburgh (1909–1939)

==== Wales ====
- Oakwood Theme Park, Pembrokeshire (1987–2025)
- Ocean Beach, Rhyl (1954–2007)

== North America ==
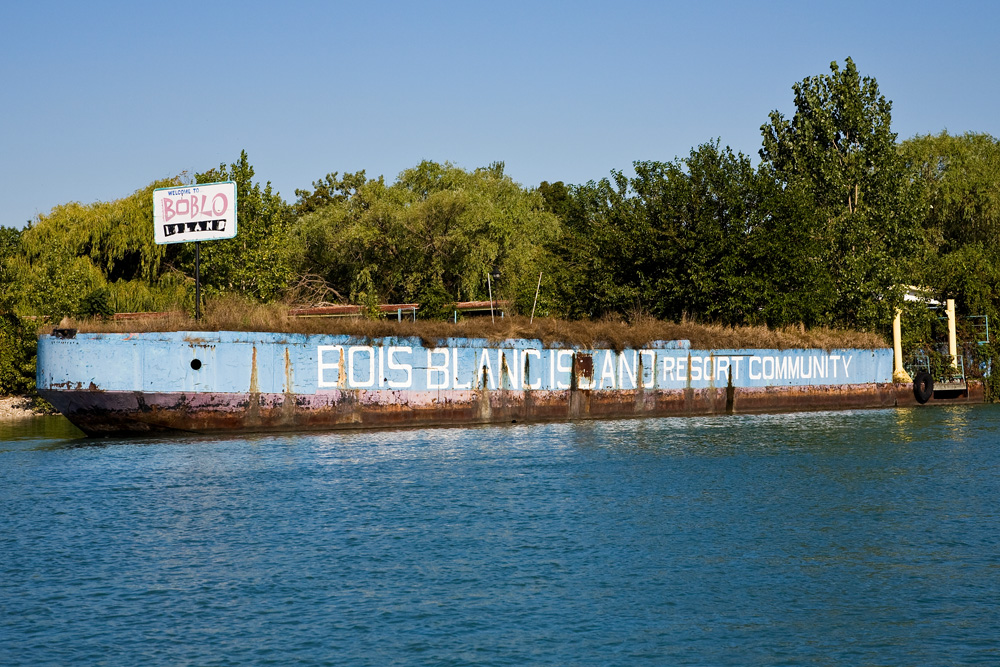
Former main dock to Boblo Island Amusement Park, Amherstburg, Ontario, Canada

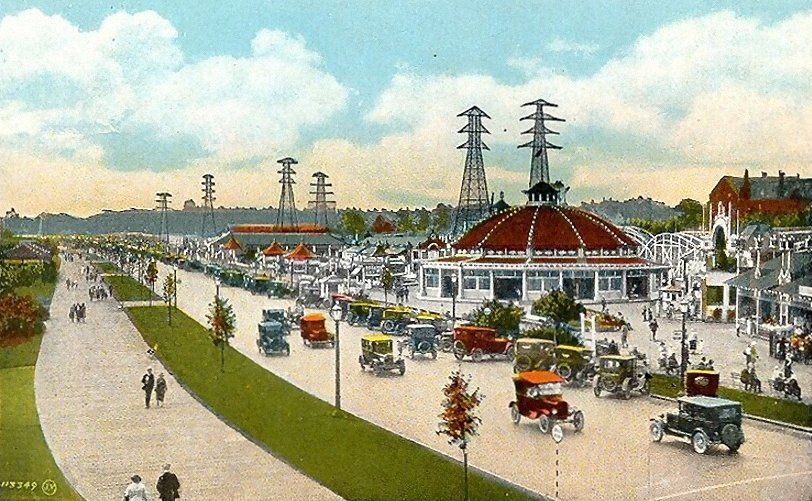
Sunnyside Amusement Park in 1931, Toronto, Ontario, Canada

=== Canada ===
- Bedrock City, Kelowna, British Columbia (????–1998)
- Belmont Park, Montréal, Québec (1923–1983)
- Boblo Island Amusement Park, Amherstburg, Ontario (1898–1993)
- Captain Bart's Science Adventure Park, Cavendish, Prince Edward Island
- Crystal Beach Park, Fort Erie, Ontario (1888–1989)
- Crystal Palace Amusement Park, Dieppe, New Brunswick (1990–2014)
- Dinotown (1975–2010)
- Dominion Park, Montréal, Québec (1906–1937)
- Encounter Creek (formerly "Fairyland"), New Haven, Prince Edward Island
- Erie Beach Amusement Park, Fort Erie, Ontario (1904–1930)
- Fantasy Gardens, Richmond, British Columbia (1970s–2010)
- Hanlan's Point Amusement Park, Toronto, Ontario (1885–1936)
- Happyland Park (1906–1922)
- King Edward Amusement Park, Ile Grosbois Boucherville, Quebec (1909–1928)
- Magic Valley Theme Park, Alma, Nova Scotia (1971–2014)
- Maple Leaf Village, Niagara Falls, Ontario (1979–1992)
- Marineland of Canada, Niagara Falls, Ontario (1961–2024)
- Mill River Fun Park, Mill River, Prince Edward Island (????–2017)
- Never Never Land, Hill Island, Ontario (1967–1980)
- Ontario Place, Toronto, Ontario (1971–2011)
- Pyramid Place, Niagara Falls, Ontario (1979–1983)
- Rainbow Valley, Cavendish, Prince Edward Island (1969–2005)
- Scarboro Beach Amusement Park, Toronto, Ontario (1907–1925)
- Storyland (1966–2011)
- Sunnyside Amusement Park, Toronto, Ontario (1922–1955)
- Trinity Loop, Trinity, Newfoundland (1900s–2004)
- Upper Clements Parks, Upper Clements, Nova Scotia (1989–2019)
- Wild Rapids Waterslide Park, Sylvan Lake, Alberta (1982–2016)
- Wild Zone Adventures, Chatham Kent, Ontario (1997–2009)

=== Mexico ===
==== Mexico City ====
- La Feria de Chapultepec (1964–2019)
- Parque Acuático Mundo A, Aguascalientes (????–????)
- Plaza Show, Lago de Guadalupe, Dinosaur Park is now a university, UVM Lago de Guadalupe (1980–1989)

==== Monterrey ====
- Mundo de Adeveras (2005–2009)

==== Guadalupe ====
- Bosque Mágico (1993–2022)

== Oceania ==
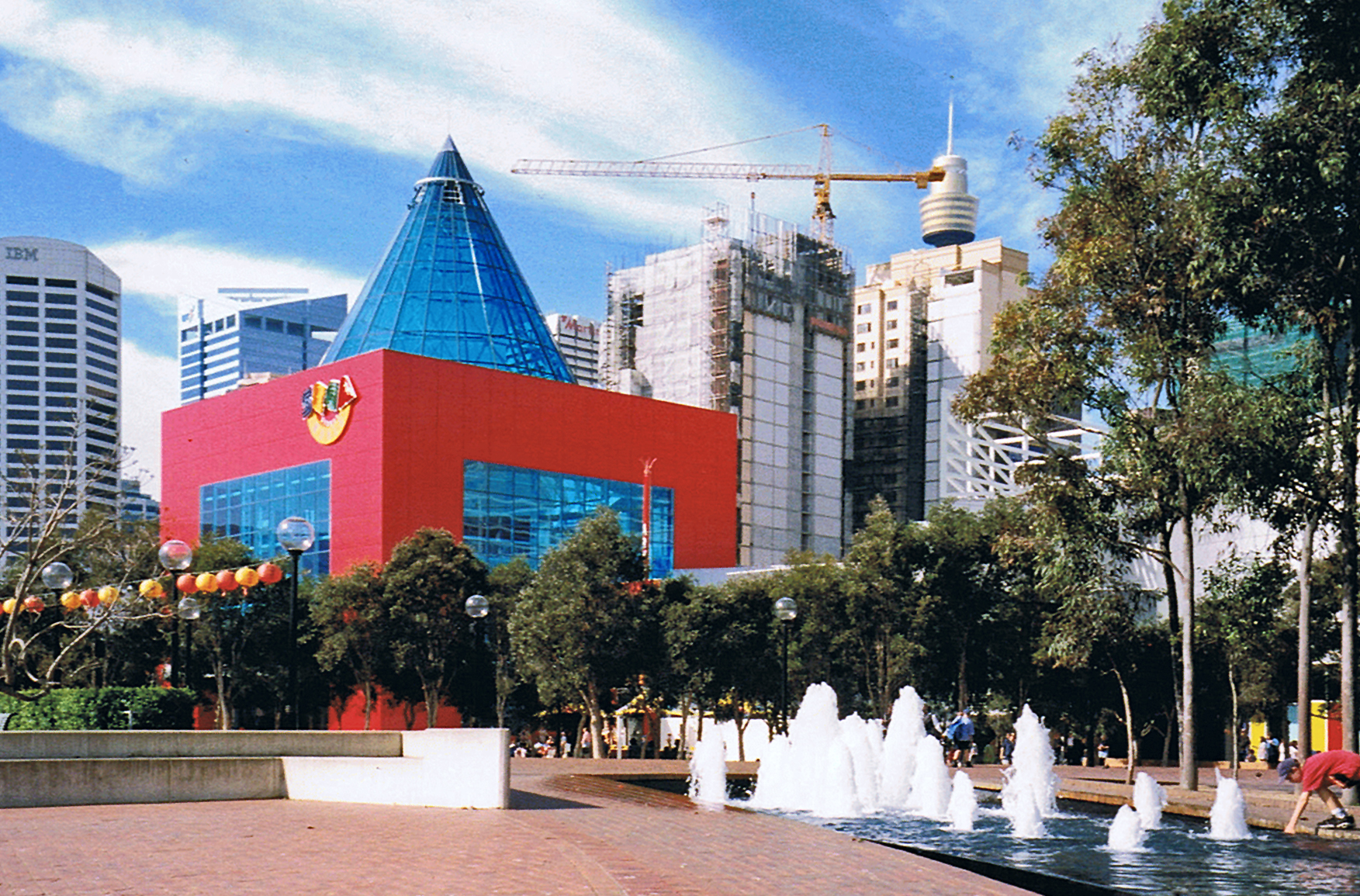
The Sega World Sydney building in 1998, Sydney

Robson's Figure Eight in 1908. Dreamland, St. Kilda, Victoria

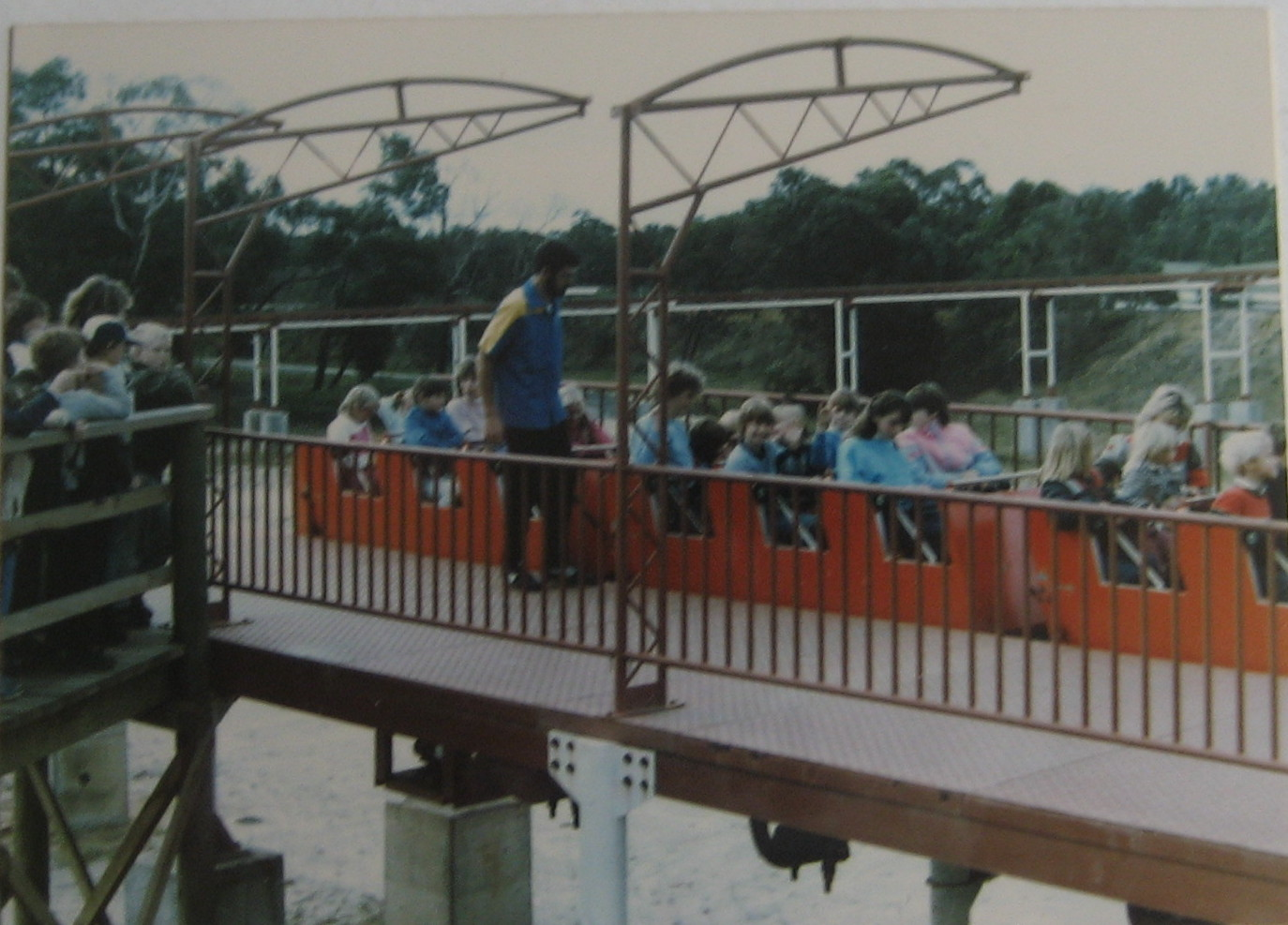
The roller coaster at Leisureland Fair, Langwarrin, Victoria

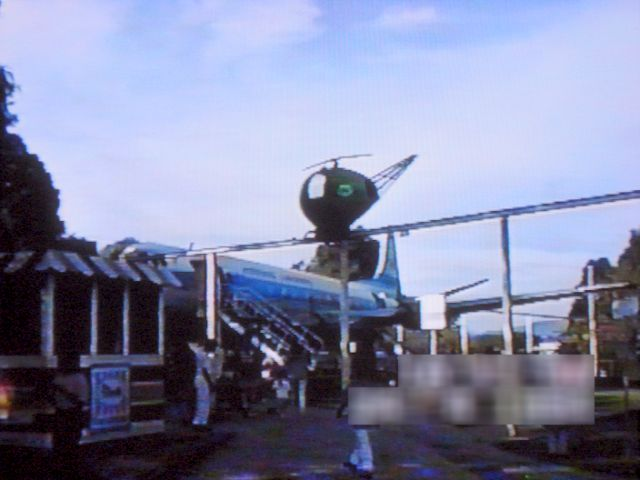
A scene at Wobbies World, Nunawading, Victoria

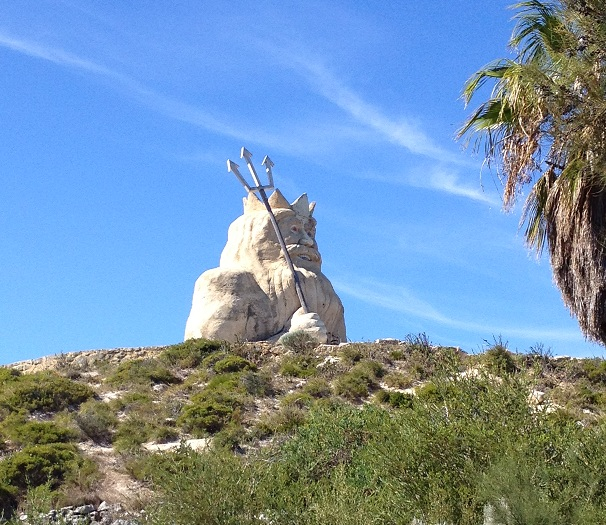
The King Neptune statue at Atlantis Marine Park, near Perth (2012).

=== Australia ===
==== Australian Capital Territory ====
- Canberry Fair, Watson (1981–1991)

==== New South Wales ====
- African Lion Safari, Warragamba (1968–1991)
- Bullen's Animal World, Wallacia (1969–1985)
- Dizzyland Fun Park, Salt Ash (2008–2014)
- El Caballo Blanco, Catherine Field (1972–2007)
- Fantasy Glades, Port Macquarie (1968–2002)
- Leyland Brothers World, Karuah (1990–1992) – currently operates as The Great Aussie Bush Camp
- Magic Kingdom, Sydney, Lansvale (1970s–1990s)
- Manly Fun Pier, Manly (1931–1989)
- Mount Druitt Waterworks, Mount Druitt (1981–1994)
- Old Sydney Town, Somersby (1975–2003) – currently used for film and television production
- O'Neill's Adventureland, Leppington (????–????) – the park only operates occasionally with portable rides
- Paradise Gardens, Cattai (1969–1988)
- Sega World Sydney (1997–2000)
- Tomteland, Williamtown (????–????)
- White City, Rushcutters Bay (1913–1917)
- Wonderland City (1906–1911)
- Wonderland Sydney, Eastern Creek (1985–2004)
- Manly Waterworks (1981–2025?)
- Hollywood Park Lansvale (1970s–early-to-mid-1990s)

==== Queensland ====
- Adventure Parc, Tamborine Mountain (????–????)
- Amazons Aquatic Adventureland, Jindalee (????–????) – closed down in 2001, the site has since become Centenary Quays, a gated community
- Aquatic Adventureland, North Rockhampton (????–????)
- Grundy's Entertainment Centre, Surfers Paradise (1980–1993)
- Luna Park, Redcliffe Peninsula (1944–1966)
- Magic Mountain Fun Park, Nobby Beach (1962–1987)
- Marineland, Main Beach (????–????)
- Mirage Grand Prix, Oxley (????–????)
- Nostalgia Town, Pacific Paradise (????–????)
- Olympia Theme Park, Alexandra Headland (????–????)
- Queensport Aquarium, Brisbane (1889–1901)
- Top's Amusement, Myer Centre, Brisbane (????–????) – was on the top floor; included a roller coaster, a swinging pirate ship and bumper cars. Was deconstructed in 2000 to become the site for Event Cinemas
- World Expo Park (1988–1989)

==== South Australia ====
- Dazzleland, Adelaide Myer Centre (1991–1998) – was on the top floor, included a roller coaster along with many other activities including a ball crawl
- Greenhills Adventure Park (1982–2016)
- Luna Park, Glenelg (1930–1935) – the rides for this park were sent to Luna Park Sydney upon its closure
- Magic Mountain, Glenelg (1982–2004) – this popular park boasted four waterslides built into an artificial mountain; has since been demolished as part of a redevelopment of the foreshore and replaced by a new park called The Beachouse
- Puzzle Park, Murray Bridge (????–????) – adjacent to the Callington exit on the South Eastern Freeway; now closed although many items of equipment still remain on the site

==== Tasmania ====
- Hobart Zoo, Hobart (1895–1937)
- Serendipity Park, Devonport (????–????)
- Gumbles, Richmond (????–????)

==== Victoria ====
- African Lion Safari, Rockbank (????–????)
- Alpine Toboggan Park, Whittlesea (????–????) – expanded and renamed Funfields; original toboggan runs still in existence.
- Dinosaur World, Creswick (1982–2002)
- Dreamland, St Kilda (1906–1909) – the park's Figure Eight rollercoaster remained in operation until 1914; the site is home to Luna Park, Melbourne today
- Hi-Lite Park, Geelong (1956–1985)
- Kinkuna Country Fun and Fauna Park, Lakes Entrance (????–????)
- Leisureland Fair, Langwarrin (1984–1992)
- Rosebud Fun and Picnic Park, Rosebud (????–????)
- The Swagmans Hat Amusement Park, Corinella (????–????)
- Whistle Stop Amusement Park, Frankston (????–????)
- Wirth's Olympia Circus, Melbourne (????–????)
- Wobbies World, Forest Hill (1970–1999)

==== Western Australia ====
- Action Park, Mirrabooka (????–????)
- Atlantis Marine Park, Two Rocks (1981–1990)
- El Caballo Blanco (1974–1995)
- Wanneroo Lion Park (formerly Bullen's African Lion Safari Park), Carabooda (????–????)
- Dizzylamb Park, Carabooda (????–????)
- Elizabethan Village, Armadale (1977–1980s)
- Luna Park, Scarborough Beach (1939–1972)
- Pioneer World, Armadale (????–????)
- White City, also known as Ugly Land and Cooee City, Perth (????–1929)
- The Great Escape, Hillarys (????–2018)

=== New Zealand ===
- Fantasy Land Amusement Park, Hastings (????–????) – the site is now occupied by Splash Planet
- Footrot Flats Fun Park, Te Atatu Peninsula, Auckland, originally known as Leisureland (1984–1989)
- Luna Park, Quay Street, Auckland (1926–1931)
- Safari Land, Massey, Auckland closed in 1988.

== South America ==
=== Argentina ===
- Italpark, Buenos Aires (1960–1990)
- Parque de la Ciudad (Ex Interama), Buenos Aires (1982–2006)

=== Brazil ===
- Playcenter, Barra Funda, São Paulo (1973–2012)
- Luna Park, Rio de Janeiro (????–2006)
- Terra Encantada, Barra da Tijuca, Rio de Janeiro (1998–2010)
- Tivoli Parque, Rio de Janeiro (1973–1995)
- Playcenter Pernambuco, Recife (1994–2002; rethemed to Mirabilandia)
- Mirabilandia, Recife (1994–2025)
- Wet 'n Wild Salvador, Salvador (????–????)
- Wet 'n Wild Rio de Janeiro, Rio de Janeiro (????–????)
- Rio Water Planet, Rio de Janeiro (????–????)

=== Peru ===
- Luna Park, Lima (????–2007)

== See also ==
- Amusement park
- Amusement park accidents
- Common names used by amusement parks:
  - Electric Park
  - Luna Park
  - White City
- List of amusement parks
- List of closed rides and attractions
- List of former zoos and aquariums
- List of world's fairs
- Roller Coaster DataBase
