= Mount Druitt (disambiguation) =

Mount Druitt is a suburb of Sydney.

Mount Druitt may also refer to:

- Electoral district of Mount Druitt, New South Wales state electoral district
- Mount Druitt railway station, a train station in Mount Druitt
- Mount Druitt Hospital, a hospital in Mount Druitt
- Mount Druitt Aerodrome, a Royal Australian Air Force landing ground
- Mount Druitt Waterworks, a theme park in Mount Druitt
