= Leisureland Fair =

Amusement park in Victoria, Australia (1984–1992)

Coordinates: 38°10′13.35″S 145°12′42.26″E

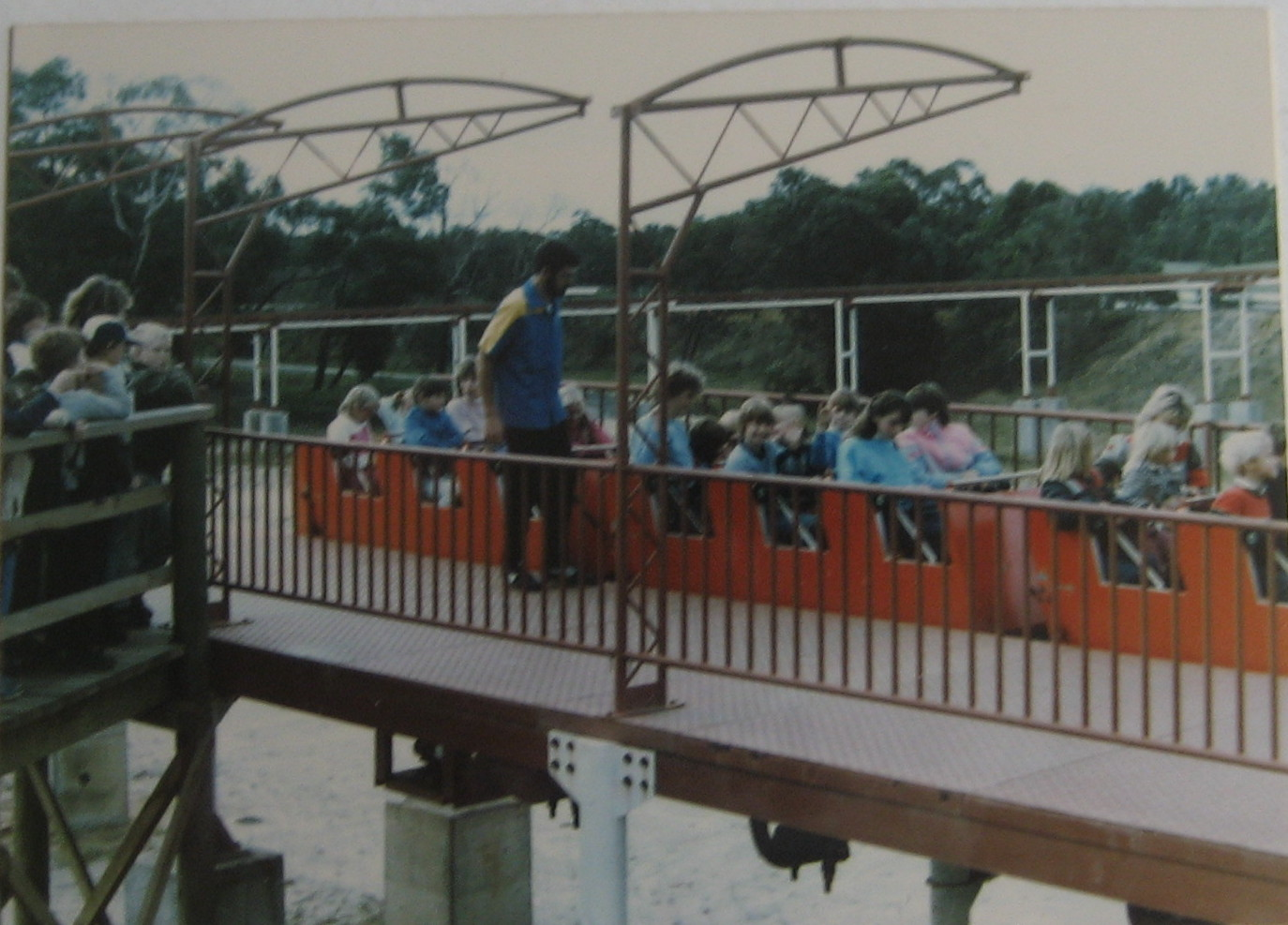
The roller coaster

Leisureland Fair was an amusement park in Langwarrin, Victoria, Australia which operated from 1984 to 1992. It is now a housing estate with the only reference to it being a street named after it. The amusement park was situated on a large plot of land with a steam train which would take passengers from the carpark to the park itself.

The park consisted of many attractions including a custom built steel roller coaster, log flume, waterslides, mini-golf, a function centre and various other rides. The park was then sold on to a religious group who developed the site into housing.

The only remaining part of Leisureland Fair is the former Function Centre, otherwise known as The Castle. It was once the main terminus for the amusement park, situated in the centre of what was the park.

The Function Centre has now been significantly renovated on the inside and operates as a Mosque and cultural centre, the Bait-ul-Salam - House of Peace Mosque, for the Australian Ahmadiyyan Muslim Community.

== See also ==
- List of defunct amusement parks
