= Taiwan Studio City =

Theme park in Taichung City, Taiwan

- Interactive map of Taiwan Studio City
- Location: Taichung City, Taiwan
- Opened: 1990
- Closed: 1999

The Taiwan Studio City (Chinese: 台灣電影文化城; pinyin: Táiwān Diànyǐng Wénhuà Chéng) was a theme park in Wufeng District, Taichung City, Taiwan operated by Taiwan Film Culture Co.. It was destroyed during the 1999 Jiji earthquake.

The park was rebuilt from a filming site owned by Taiwan Film Culture Co, with a land area of 10 hectares, and split into three areas of "Film Technology Exhibition Area" 電影科技展示區, "Folk Culture Park" 民俗文化園區, and "Activity and Rest Area" 活動休憩區. The "Film Technology Exhibition Area" features facilities such as a robot theatre, cartoon exhibition hall, and a 360-degree stereoscopic audiovisual hall, where visitors can enjoy the visual impact of science and technology films. The "Folk Culture Park" is set up based on the street scenes in the movie Crossing Taiwan 唐山過台灣, with solemn and grand ancient temples, antique towns, and bustling markets, along with various folk art activities.

The Central Taiwan Film Studios (中台灣影視基地) were established in 2019 in Wufeng. It was unrelated to the original Taiwan Studio City or Taiwan Film Culture Co, but owned by Central Motion Picture Corporation instead.

== See also ==
- List of tourist attractions in Taiwan
- List of defunct amusement parks
