= Mill River Fun Park =

Canadian amusement park

Coordinates: 46°44′30″N 64°10′8″W

The Mill River Fun Park was a Canadian amusement park located in Mill River, Prince Edward Island.

The park was permanently closed in 2017 and all remaining attractions were demolished or sold.

== Attractions ==
The Mill River Fun Park included a swimming pool, bumper boats, a petting zoo, and other attractions.

== History ==
The Mill River Fun Park was conceived by private sector investors during the 1980s based on economic development funding from the federal and provincial governments. Following an economic downturn in the early 1990s, the property was acquired by the provincial government and has been operated by the provincial parks system, however it is not considered a provincial park.

The provincial government sold the park, along with the Mill River Golf Course, Rodd Mill River hotel, campground, spa, and restaurant, to Don McDougall in early 2017. McDougall subsequently closed the park and removed all attractions. The area now contains walking trails which are open to the public.
