= Mirapolis =

1987–1991 theme park in northern France

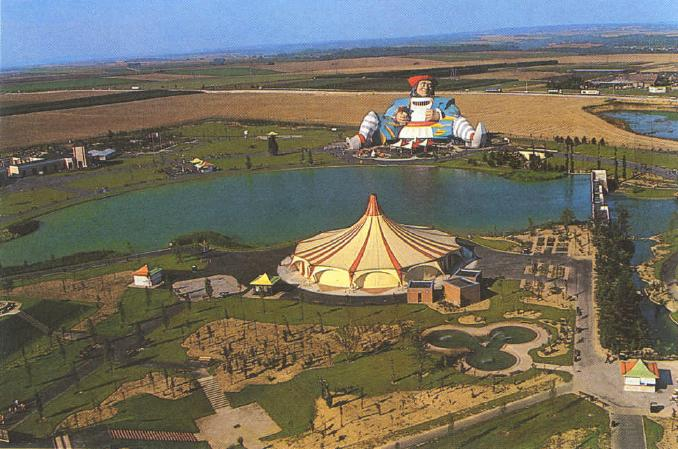
- The park seen from above, in 1987. In the background, the statue of Gargantua.
- Interactive map of Mirapolis
- Location: Courdimanche, Val-d'Oise, France
- Coordinates: 49°03′13″N 2°00′01″E
- Status: Defunct
- Opened: 21 May 1987
- Closed: 20 October 1991
- Owner: Paris-Parc; Cergy-Parc; Crédit national
- Operating season: April–October
- Attendance: 400,000
- Area: 35 ha (86 acres) (park); 20 ha (49 acres) (car park)

Attractions
- Total: 20–50
- Roller coasters: 3
- Water rides: 5

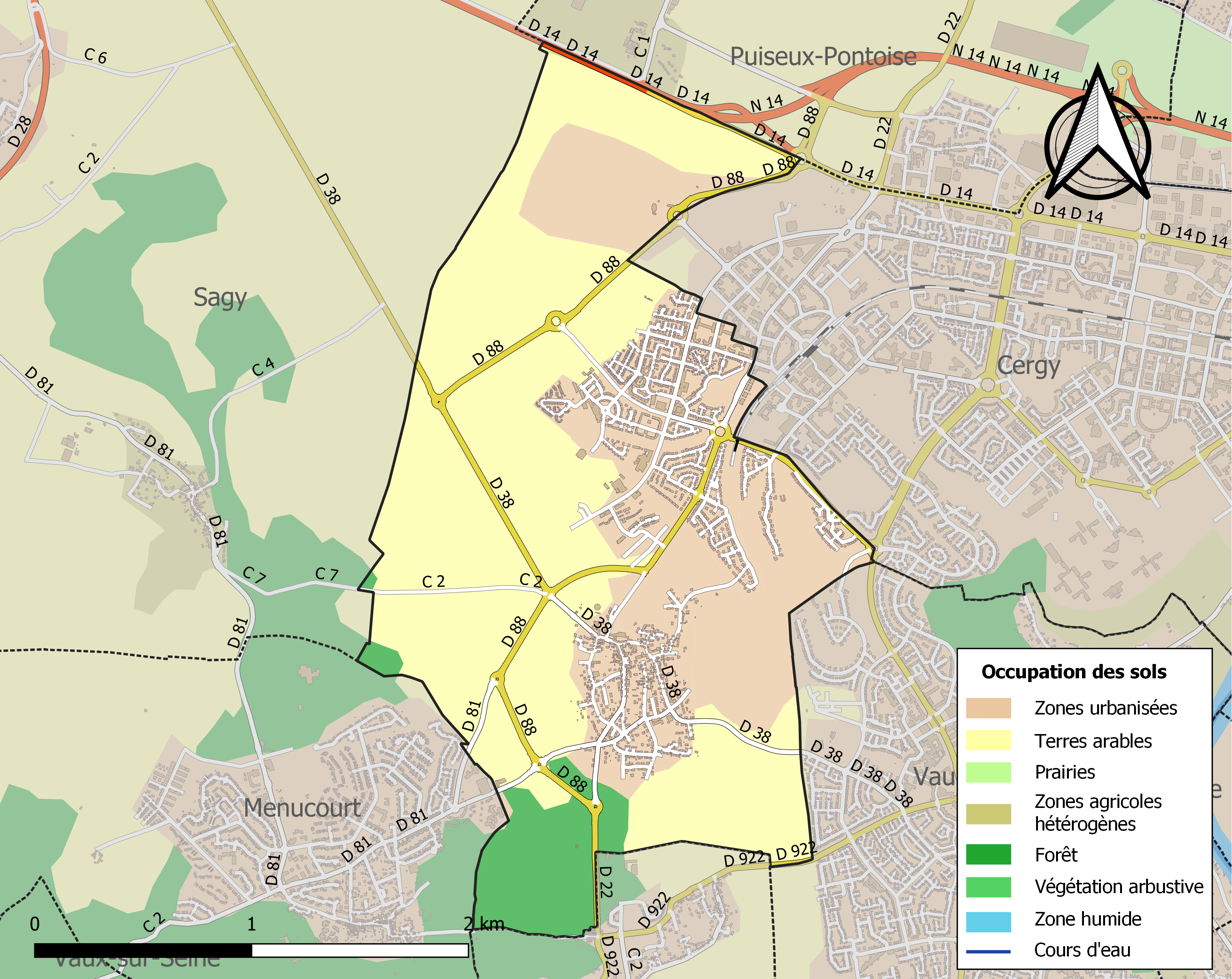
Map of Courdimanche. The site occupied by the park is the urbanized area to the north.

Mirapolis was a theme park located in Courdimanche (Val-d'Oise, France), which was based on elements from French literature (novels and fables) and culture.

Mirapolis was opened in 1987. Spanning 55 ha (136 acres), the park was described as being 'France's first large amusement park'. It encountered several problems, like other contemporary French parks, such as Zygofolis or Big Bang Schtroumpf. Mirapolis eventually closed in 1991, and was mostly demolished.

== History ==
=== Development ===
Mirapolis was originally the idea of the architect Anne Fourcade. Sodex Parc and the Banque arabe internationale d'investissement set up financial arrangements for the main investor, Saudi businessman Ghaith Pharaon.

Inspired by the big theme parks of the time, such as Disneyland, Mirapolis was to be one of the first French theme parks, and it was to be based on French tales and novels. The park would be dominated by a huge statue of Gargantua, inside which a dark ride attraction would be installed.

=== Opening ===
Mirapolis was inaugurated on 20 May 1987 by Jacques Chirac, who was Prime Minister at the time. The park included 20 attractions, 3,000 restaurant seats, 13 shops and 12 food kiosks; it was able to welcome 28,000 visitors a day. It was split into 8 themed areas.

In 1988, the famous singer Carlos becomes sponsor of the park.

The first year, bad weather caused problems for outdoor events, and people often took refuge in the "Grand Théâtre". Tens of thousands of people saw a children's musical, "Partir à point", with lyrics and music by René-Louis Baron. It was a comic mixture of the works of Jean de La Fontaine using a staging of giant puppets created by Yves Brunier (creator of the giant puppet "Casimir").

=== Closure, demolition and abandonment ===
The park was closed in 1991 having never made a profit. Expectations of profitability had been overly optimistic and based on incorrect market research. Mirapolis may also have suffered from its complex theming (diluted in 1989 with funfair attractions), its image and its high upkeep.

Starting in 1993, the majority of the buildings were demolished. Some attractions were sent to other amusement parks. Dragon des Sortilèges went to Spreepark, as well as Miralooping. Miralooping is at Europark now called Fabrikus world. Les pirates went to Meli Park, which in 2000 reopened as Plopsaland. On 1 September 1995, after the partial and controversial dismantling of the Gargantua statue, the head was finally dynamited.

In 1994, the road alignment near Mirapolis was modified. The entrance square was made into a roundabout. The two main sections of the car park were made into a road and extended, forming the Boulevard des Merveilles in the Cergy-le-Haut area.

The inside of the park was abandoned. Only a few buildings endure: the gates and their elephant heads, the concrete building at the entrance, the former store, the small kiosk of the Observatoire and the Mur Vauban. The car parks were also abandoned, and are now partially hidden by vegetation.

Sometimes the park is used by the National Gendarmerie and the GIGN for manoeuvres.

On 20 May 2017, to celebrate the 30th anniversary of the opening of the park, the association 'Mirapolis, les amis du parc' set up an exhibition in the Salle Georges Brassens of Menucourt, retracing the history of Mirapolis with the help of photographs, models and items.

The building of a touristic ecodistrict was expected in 2018 on the former site of Mirapolis.

=== New development ===
In August 2026, the former Mirapolis site was selected for a major new entertainment development near Cergy-Pontoise. France and Saudi Arabia announced a €6 billion project, backed by Saudi Arabia's Qiddiya, to develop three theme parks in the Paris region. The first announced park would be dedicated to the Dragon Ball franchise and is planned for the former Mirapolis site in Courdimanche. The development is expected to create around 22,000 jobs and could bring large-scale theme park development back to the site more than three decades after Mirapolis closed.

== Gallery ==
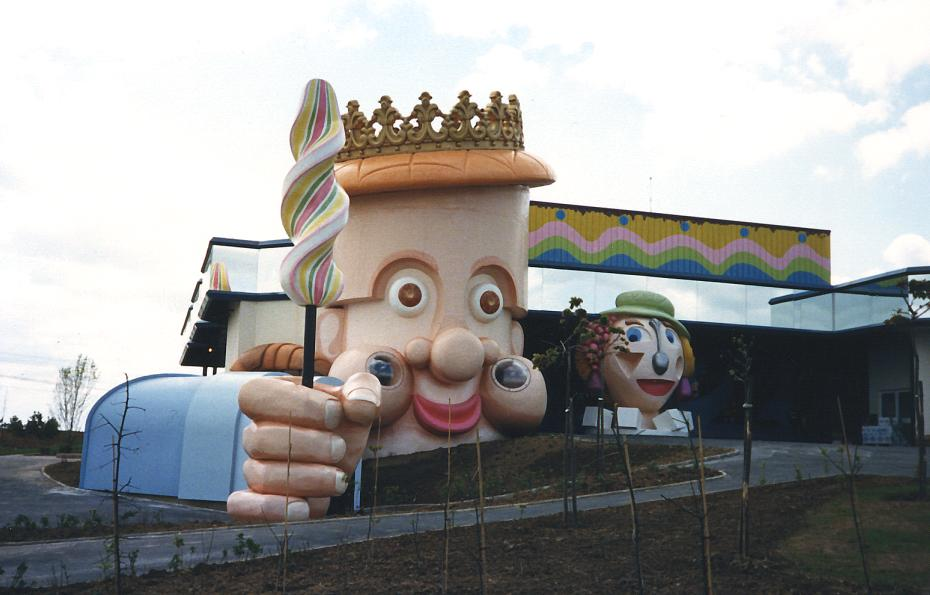
Dame tartine

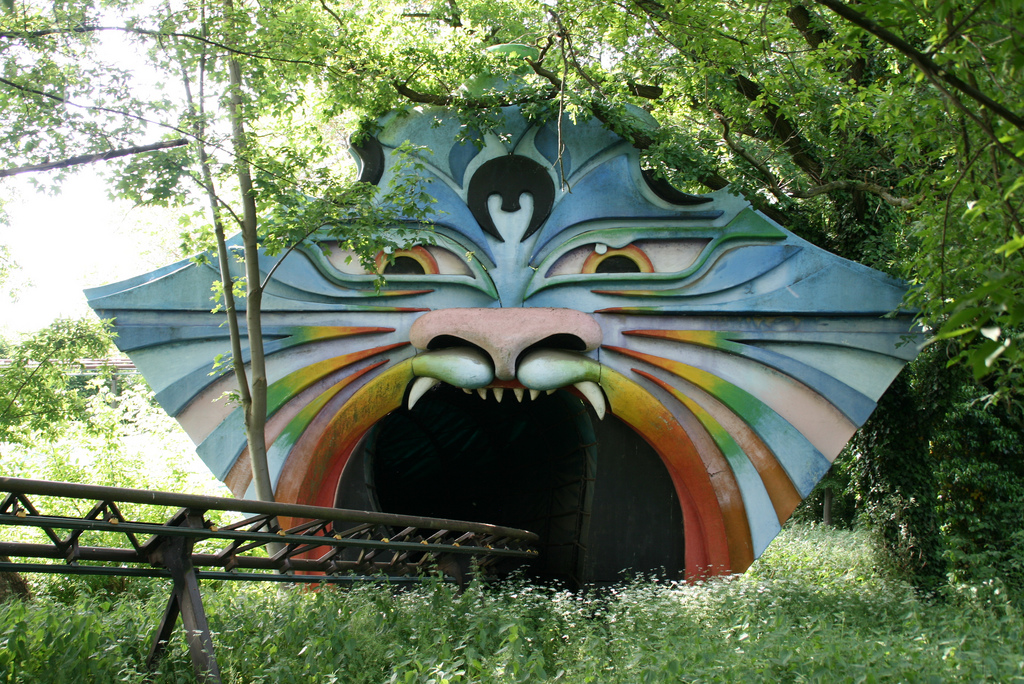
Dragon des Sortilèges, now at Spreepark (Germany)

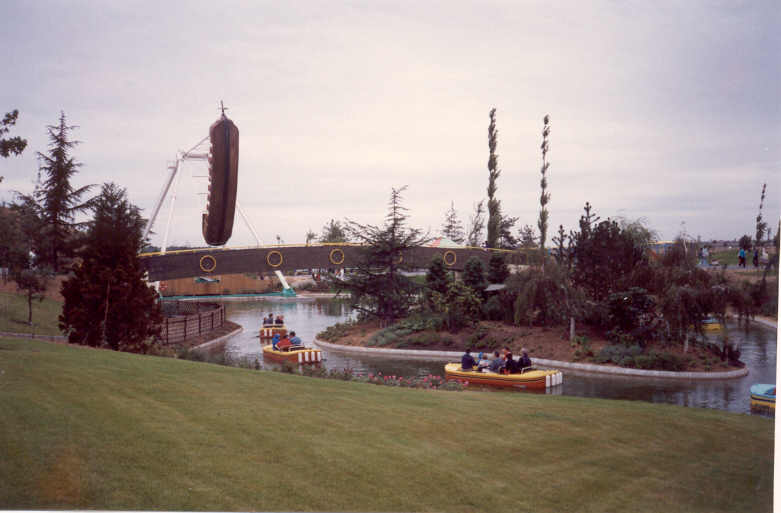
Rivière des castors and bateau pirate

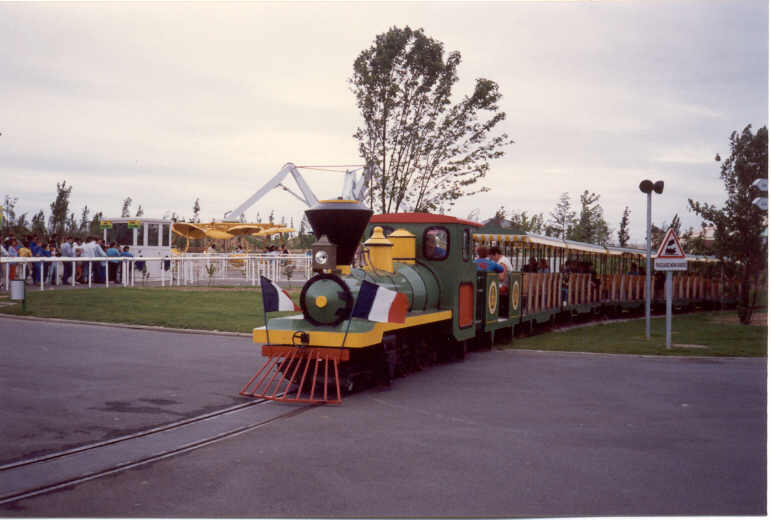
Mirapolis express

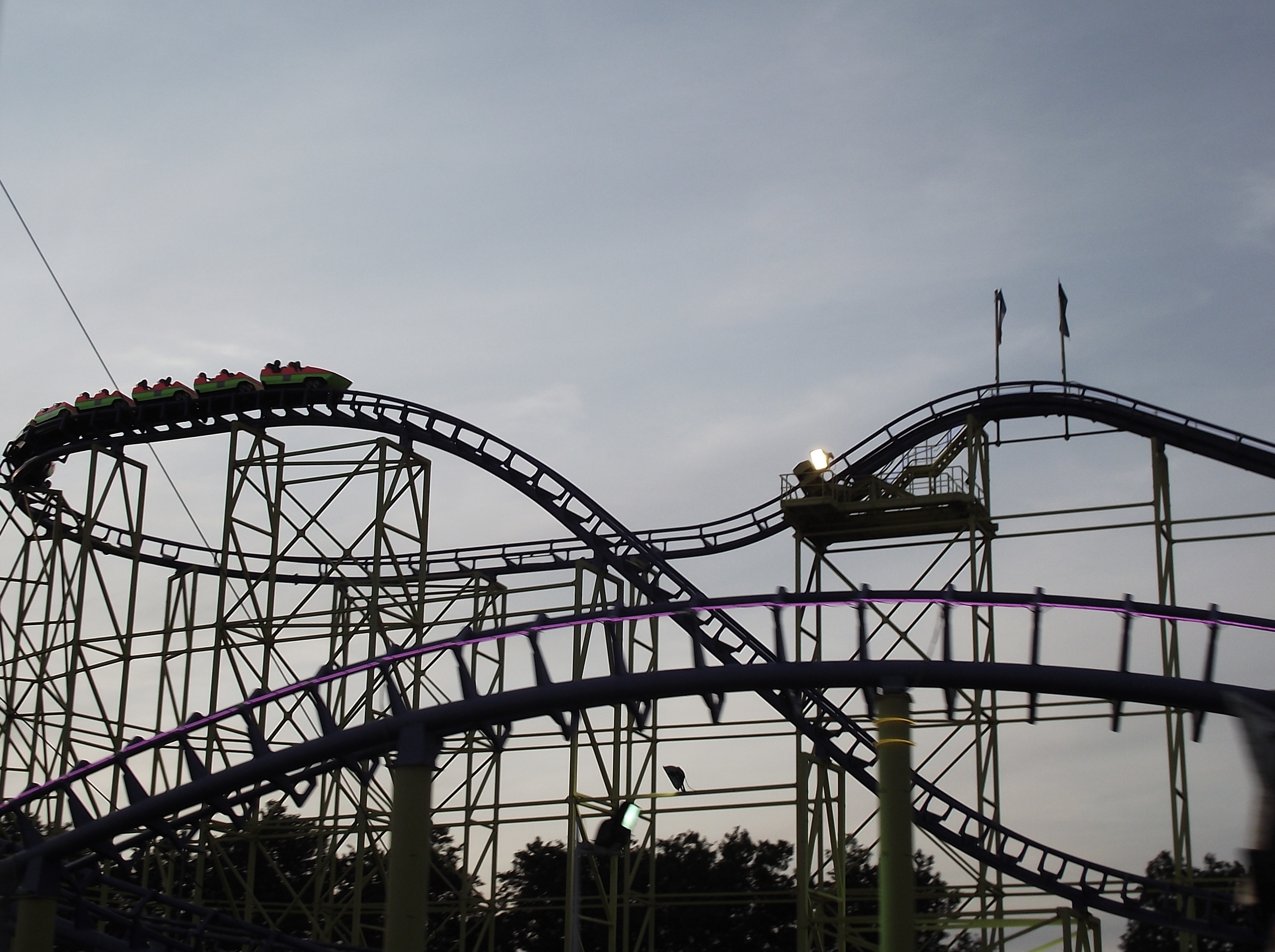
Miralooping, now at Europark (France)

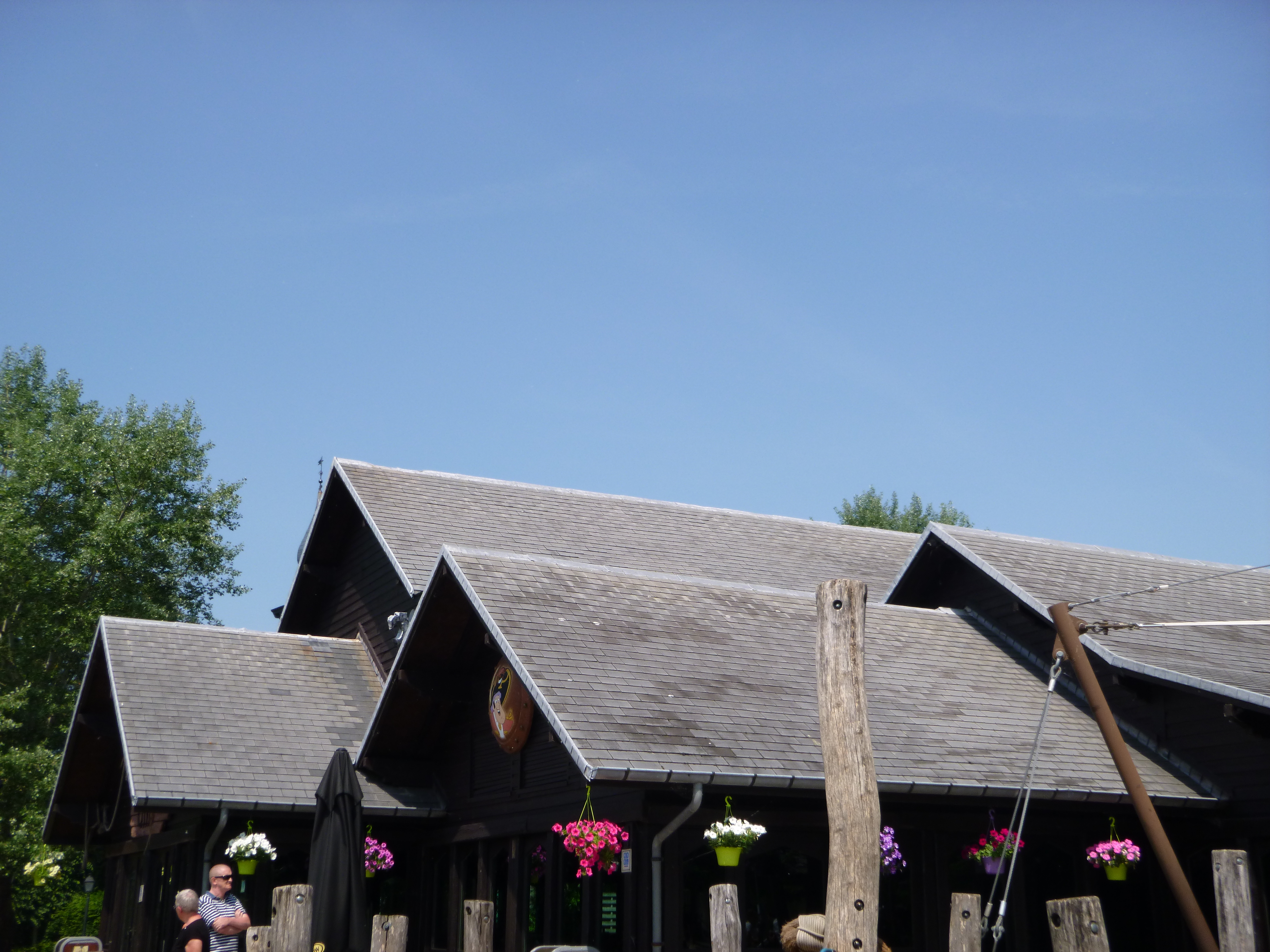
Les pirates, now at Plopsaland (Belgium)

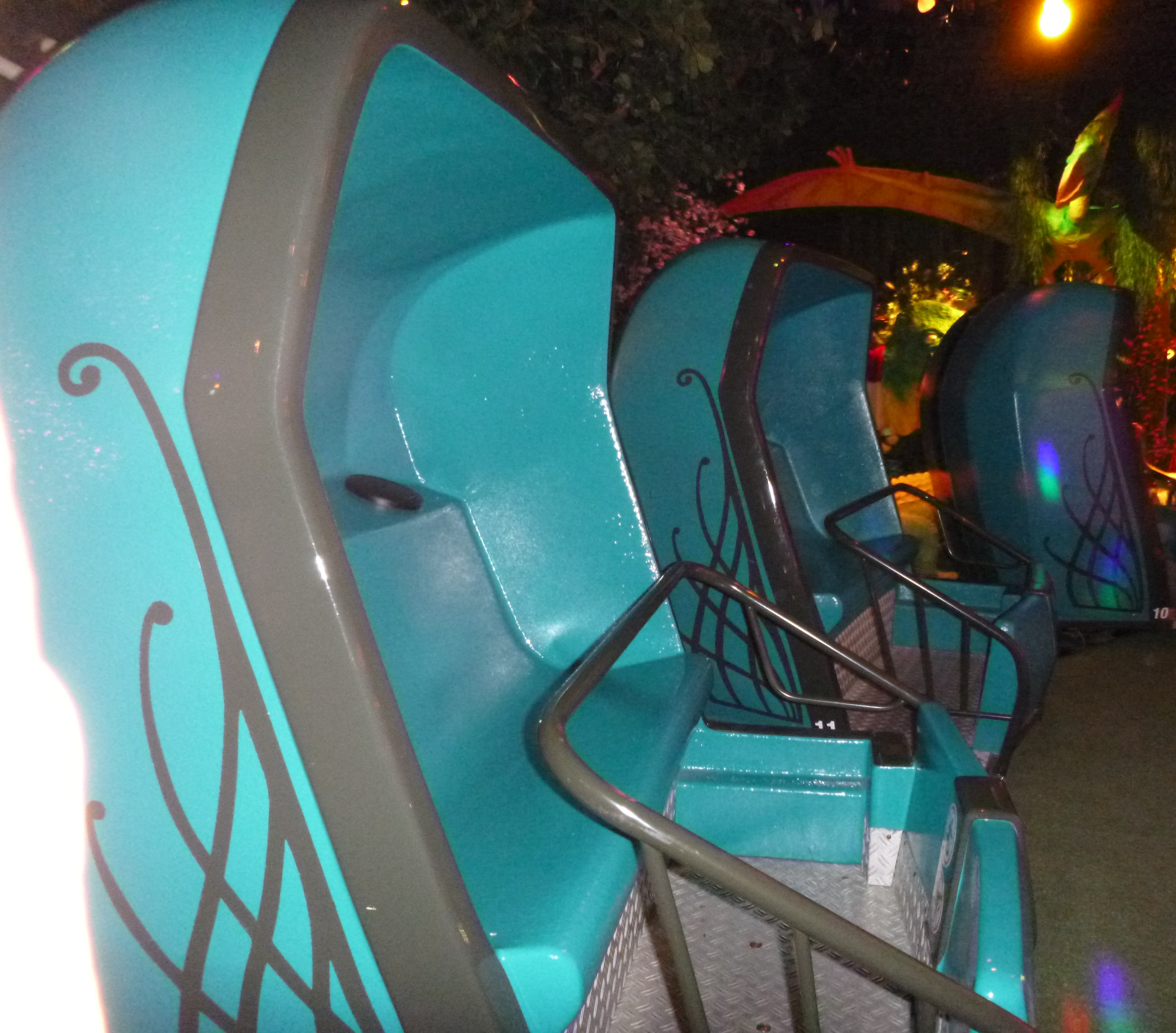
Voyage sous la mer, now at Europa-Park (Germany)

== See also ==
- Lillom
- Parc Astérix
- Disneyland Park (Paris)
- Walygator Parc

== Bibliography ==
- More information in the French magazine Dixième Planète n° 42 (August–September 2006).
