= BMX Bandits (film) =

1983 Australian crime comedy action film

- Australian film poster
- Directed by: Brian Trenchard-Smith
- Screenplay by: Patrick Edgeworth
- Story by: Russell Hagg
- Produced by: Tom Broadbridge; Paul F. Davies
- Starring: David Argue; John Ley; Nicole Kidman; Angelo D'Angelo; James Lugton
- Cinematography: John Seale
- Edited by: Alan Lake
- Music by: Colin Stead; Frank Strangio
- Production company: Nilsen Premiere
- Distributed by: Filmways Australasian Distributors
- Release date: 29 December 1983
- Running time: 88 minutes
- Country: Australia
- Language: English
- Budget: A$1.05 million
- Box office: A$124,649–$1 million

BMX Bandits (released as Short Wave in the United States) is a 1983 Australian action crime comedy film directed by Brian Trenchard-Smith and starring Nicole Kidman, Angelo D'Angelo and James Lugton.

Stephen Vagg of Filmink described it as "perhaps the greatest Australian kids’ film ever, a brilliantly fun and high-spirited heist tale."

In the film, a professional band of criminals is given orders to perform a payroll robbery. The law-enforcement-grade walkie-talkies which it intends to use to successfully elude the police are stolen by local teenaged kids, after which the gang is then compelled to pursue the juvenile thieves.

== Plot ==
After a successful Sydney bank robbery, with the robbers wearing pig masks and wielding shotguns, the man in charge, "The Boss", plans a further and larger payroll robbery for two days later, worth at least $1.5 million. He hopes that he can trust his less-than-competent gang, headed by Whitey and Moustache, to do the job properly. Anyone who fails will answer to him.

Two young BMX experts, P. J. and Goose, meet Judy, who is working as a trolley collector at the Warringah Mall during the school holidays to be able to buy her own BMX bike, and accidentally get Judy fired from her job when they crash into trolleys pushed away by the local "Creep". The three go out in Goose's dad's runabout on the harbour searching for cockles to sell to fix their own crashed bikes, as well as getting Judy her own, and stumble onto and steal a box of police-band walkie-talkies that the bank robbers were hoping to use to monitor police traffic. After stealing the box, the kids pass Whitey and Moustache, who are on their way in their high-powered motorboat to pick it up.

Judy, P.J., and Goose sell the walkie-talkies to other kids in the area. The Bayside Police can hear the kids using the walkie-talkies. Judy, P.J., and Goose are also unaware that the robbers know who stole the box. After they are spotted and chased late at night through a cemetery by Whitey and Moustache wearing monster masks (going formal, according to Whitey), they manage to escape. The next day, P.J. and Goose pick up their newly repaired bikes while Judy buys her bike. Judy is caught the next day by Whitey and Moustache while getting a second walkie-talkie for The Creep but escapes with the help of P.J. and Goose. The goons chase the Bandits in a cartoonish chase across various sites around Sydney, including a memorable escape down the Manly Waterworks water slides, complete with BMX bikes.

The trio are finally arrested but escape police custody and, with the help of the local kids, launch their plan to foil the planned payroll robbery. Using the walkie-talkies, the Bandits pinpoint the meeting place for the robbers, then proceed to ambush and apprehend the robbers. The Boss, Whitey, and Moustache escape in a removal truck with Judy as a hostage, with P.J., Goose and their BMX friends giving chase. They cause the truck to crash, with police soon arriving to arrest The Boss, Whitey and Moustache.

The police build a BMX track as thanks for the capture. In its opening meeting, the BMX Bandits sweep the main awards.

== Cast ==
- Nicole Kidman as Judy
- Angelo D'Angelo as P.J.
- James Lugton as Goose
- David Argue as "Whitey" / O'Connor
- John Ley as "Moustache" / Povic
- Bryan Marshall as The Boss
- Brian Sloman as The Creep
- Peter Browne as Police Constable
- Bill Brady as Police Sergeant
- Linda Newton as Policewoman
- Bob Hicks as Heavy #1
- Guy Norris as Heavy #2
- Chris Hession as Heavy #3
- Norman Hodges as The Drunk
- Brian Best as Supermarket Manager
- Ray Marshall as Foreman
- Patrick Mansfield as Crane Operator
- De Vuong as BMX Stunt Rider

== Filming locations ==
- Northern Beaches
- Warringah Mall
- Waverley Cemetery, Bronte
- Manly Oval
- Manly Waterworks
- The Corso
- Manly Beach
- Sydney Harbour
- Lane Cove Flour bombing scene

== Production ==
The film was originally going to be written and directed by Russell Hagg and was going to be about nine-year-old characters. He was unable to raise finance. The project passed to producer Tom Broadbridge who hired Hagg's frequent collaborator Patrick Edgeworth to rewrite the script and make it about teenagers.

Brian Trenchard-Smith was hired after the producers had been impressed by his handling of action in Turkey Shoot. He says the script was originally set in Melbourne but he persuaded them to re-set it in Sydney to take advantage of that city's locations. He set it on the northern beaches and wrote action sequences based on "my concept for the BMX action being putting BMX bikes where BMX bikes aren’t meant to be." The movie was shot over 41 days, a longer than normal shoot because of the labour restrictions caused by the fact many of the cast were under 16. Trenchard-Smith:

I wanted to capture the spirit of the Ealing comedies and British films of the '50s and '60s that were clearly aimed at children and delivered action and fun in a largely cartoonish way. If you look at the basic premise of the plot, the crooks clearly want to or intend to kill the children at some point, so how do you disguise that and make that palatable to an audience of kids and parents? You make the crooks buffoonish, the gang that couldn’t shoot straight, so that takes the curse off the underlying purpose.

Nicole Kidman sprained her ankle during filming. No female stunt double that looked like her could be found, so her bike stunts were performed by an 18-year-old man in a wig.

== Awards ==
Award	Category	Subject	Result
AACTA Awards (1983 Australian Film Institute Awards)	Best Adapted Screenplay	Patrick Edgeworth	Nominated
AACTA Awards (1983 Australian Film Institute Awards)	Best Supporting Actor	David Argue	Nominated
AACTA Awards (1983 Australian Film Institute Awards)	Best Editing	Alan Lake	Nominated
AACTA Awards (1983 Australian Film Institute Awards)	Best Sound	Andrew Steuart	Nominated
AACTA Awards (1983 Australian Film Institute Awards)	Best Sound	John Patterson	Nominated
AACTA Awards (1983 Australian Film Institute Awards)	Best Sound	Robin Judge	Nominated
AACTA Awards (1983 Australian Film Institute Awards)	Best Sound	Phil Judd	Nominated
AACTA Awards (1983 Australian Film Institute Awards)	Best Sound	Gethin Creagh	Nominated

== Box office ==
Director Trenchard-Smith states during the Blu-ray commentary that BMX Bandits grossed more than $1 million in its first 6 weeks and was the 5th-highest-grossing film in England for the year of its release. Kidman's performance led to her being cast in the TV series Five Mile Creek in which she was directed by Trenchard-Smith in some episodes.

== Home media ==
BMX Bandits was released on DVD by Umbrella Entertainment in August 2010. The DVD is compatible with all region codes and includes special features such as the trailer and audio commentary with Brian Trenchard-Smith, Eric Trenchard-Smith & Chalet Trenchard-Smith. A bonus disc includes a photo gallery, press clippings, Nicole Kidman discussing the film on Young Talent Time, and a featurette titled BMX Buddies with Brian Trenchard-Smith, Tom Broadbridge, Patrick Edgeworth, Russell Hagg, and James Lugton.

In 2013, region-free DVDs and Blu-rays were released as an updated version which includes all footage and bonus material from previous versions on one disc.

A regular edition was released on DVD by Umbrella Entertainment in January 2012 without the bonus disc.

In 2026, Umbrella released a Limited Collector's Edition of the film on 4K Ultra HD. The set featured new interviews with Trenchard-Smith and other crew members, documentaries and retrospectives, as well as the bonus material from previous versions. The set also included a 100+ page book of behind-the-scenes material and essays by Parker Constantine, Alexandra Heller-Nicholas and Cameron Mitchell, a script book featuring Trenchard Smith’s annotated shooting script, stickers, art cards, and a reversible poster.

== References in popular culture ==
American rock band Wheatus has a song titled "BMX Bandits" on their album Too Soon Monsoon. The song has been dedicated to Nicole Kidman and includes the lyrics "Hey Nicole" in the chorus. In the song's animated music video, there is an animated caricature of Kidman.

The show That Mitchell and Webb Look parodied the film in the recurrent adventures titled "Angel Summoner and BMX Bandit".

The Scottish indie rock band BMX Bandits are named after the film.

== See also ==
- Cinema of Australia
- List of films about bicycles and cycling
