= Wobbies World =

Amusement park in Melbourne, Australia

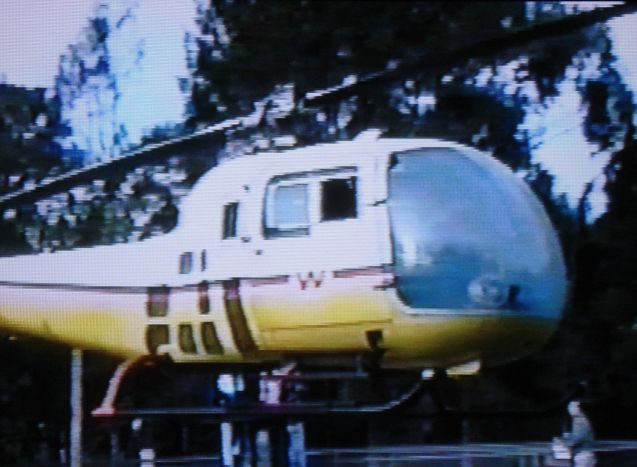
- Interactive map of Wobbies World
- Location: 469 Springvale Road Vermont South, Victoria, Australia
- Coordinates: 37°50′45″S 145°10′27″E
- Opened: Circa 1970
- Closed: 1999
- Owner: Robin Laurie
- Operating season: All year round
- Area: Melbourne, East

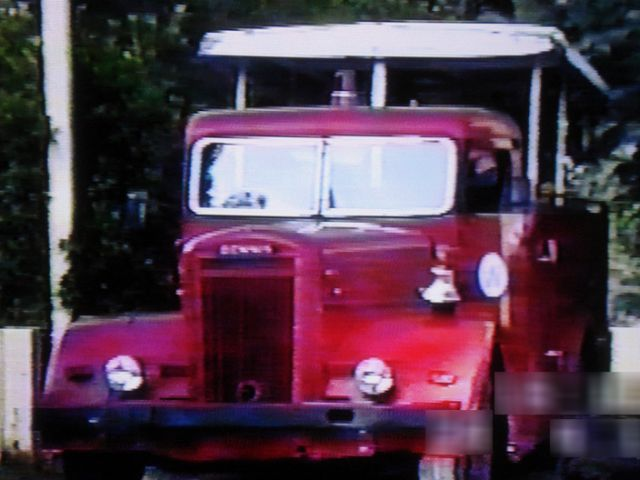
The fire truck ride

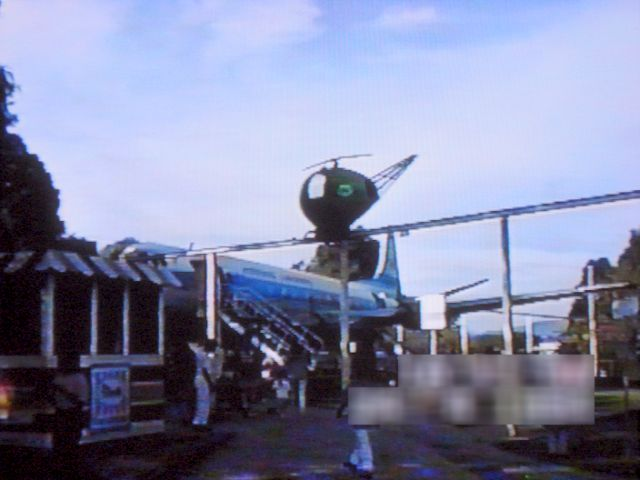
The helicopter monorail and the Vickers Viscount propeller plane

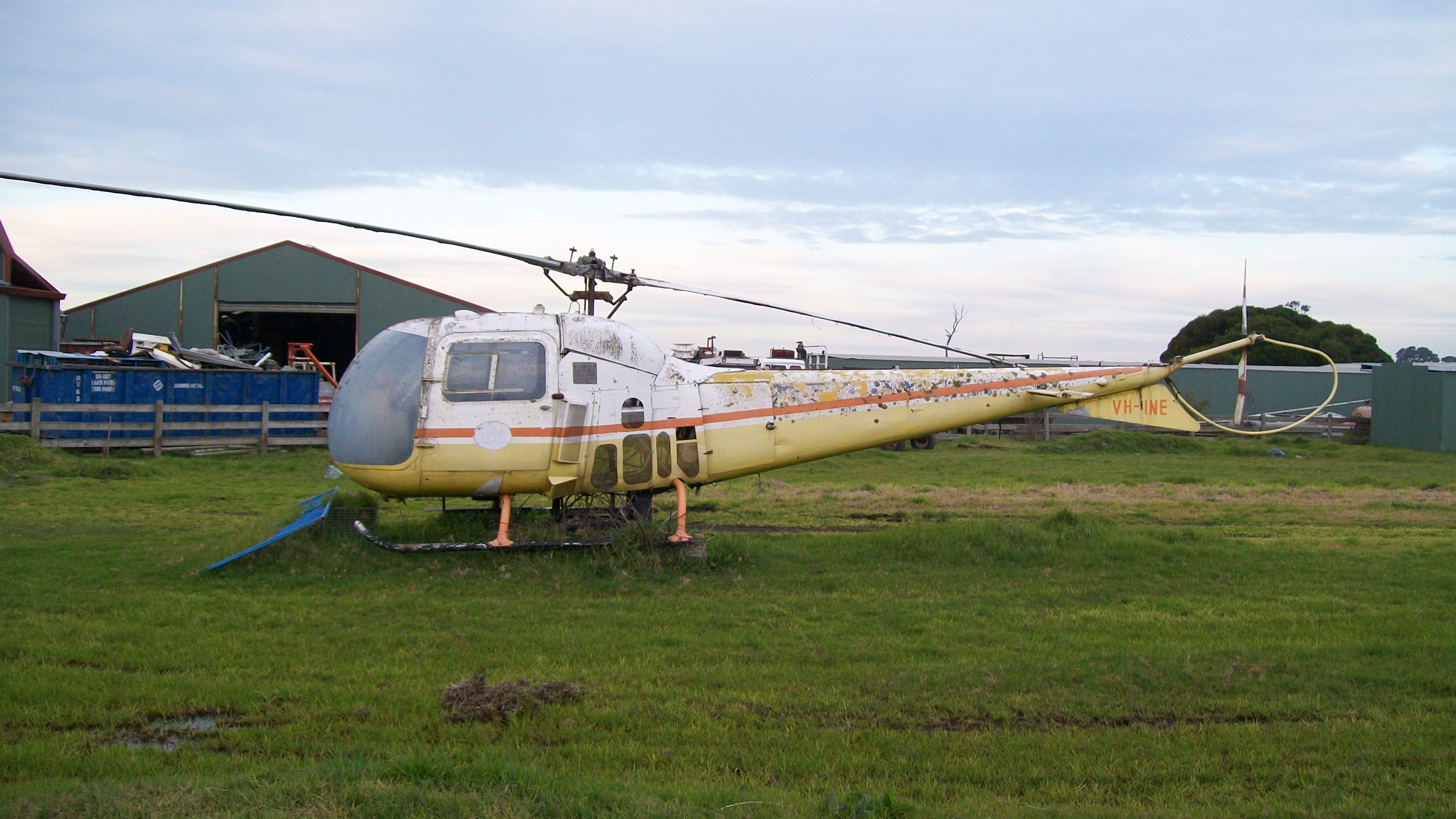
The helicopter at its present site on Dandenong-Frankston Road.

Wobbies World was an amusement park which operated from about 1970 to the late 1990s in the Melbourne suburb of Nunawading, Australia.

== History ==
The park had many custom-built attractions, most slow moving and aimed at very young children. The park had some characteristic modes of transport including a helicopter "Whirliebird" monorail circuit, mower motor driven 6 wheeler ATVs, a real Bell helicopter refurbished as a ground-mounted simulator, a "Splashdown" mini log ride.

There was a mini-golf course, trampolines, a ball pit, several food and drink kiosks, a miniature train circuit, a miniature car circuit, four Melbourne W2 class trams and a large Vickers Viscount propeller plane fitted out as a movie-projector simulator.

The plane now resides at the Australian National Aviation Museum, in Moorabbin. The Bell helicopter is dismantled and sits in a paddock on Dandenong–Frankston Road at 38°03′57″S 145°12′02″E. One of the Whirliebird helicopters now resides in the front yard of a private residence

=== History ===
Prior to the establishment of Wobbies World, the 20-acre orchard had belonged to the Tainton family.

Despite memorable television advertisements over the decades, the park slowly deteriorated in the mid to late 1990s and closed down in 1999. Its demise has been linked to the high entrance fee for the time, $36 for a family of four in 1994, and the charging of separate fees to use some of the attractions. In 1999, Australand Holdings acquired much of the former Wobbies World amusement park site from owner Robin Laurie and developed the Saxonwood estate, which comprises 32 townhouses and a three-level apartment building with apartments.

A plant nursery and the Saxon Wood town house estate occupied the Springvale Road site. The entrance gate without a road, concrete castle, bridges, a train station, the Birthday Room and the miniature golf course from the former amusement park remained within the nursery. In September 2012, the state government announced that a new Forest Hill police station was to be built on the site. The plant nursery had now closed. The site is now the location of the new Forest Hill Police Station.

The park was almost certainly being satirised by the Melbourne-based TV sketch comedy show The Late Show, in recurring sketches entitled Pissweak World, consisting of fictional low-budget TV commercials for amusement parks under the Pissweak brand, which had a variety of disappointing rides and unimpressed patrons. The style of the satirical advertisements was reminiscent of the Wobbies World TV commercial, which did not have sophisticated production values.

== See also ==
- List of abandoned amusement parks
