= Bokhdi Amusement Park =

Former amusement park in Afghanistan

Bokhdi Amusement Park was an amusement park in Sheberghan, Afghanistan. After Sheberghan was captured by the Taliban in 2021, videos showing Taliban fighters riding bumper cars and a merry-go-round went viral on Twitter. However, it was burned down a day later due to the presence of statues and idols in the park, which are prohibited in their interpretation of Islam due to Islam prohibiting any idolatry because of shirk.
