= Ciputra Waterpark =

Waterpark in Surabaya, Indonesia

Coordinates: 7°17′4″S 112°37′57″E

Ciputra Waterpark was a waterpark located in Surabaya. It is one of the biggest waterparks in Southeast Asia prior to its closure in 2021. It is located at the western part of Surabaya.
