= Kabe sommarland =

Former theme park in Jönköping, Sweden

- Interactive map of Kabe sommarland
- Location: Jönköping, Sweden
- Coordinates: 57.763664°N 14.142881°E
- Opened: 1984
- Closed: 1995

Kabe sommarland or just Kabeland was a summertime-based amusement park in Jönköping, Sweden. What once was a summer park is now deserted and ruined. It was located at Haga near the Jönköping paintball park.

The facility was built by KABE Husvagnar AB back in the early 1980s. The park was opened in 1984 by Gösta Gunnarsson, back then Jönköping County governor. The first years were successful but the early 1990s economic recession stroke hard against the economy. Some years later a pyromaniac was roaming the neighbourhoods. In September 1995 a fire destroyed the restaurant and after the 1995 season the park was closed down, deserted and devastated.
