= Wonderland City =

Defunct amusement park in Sydney

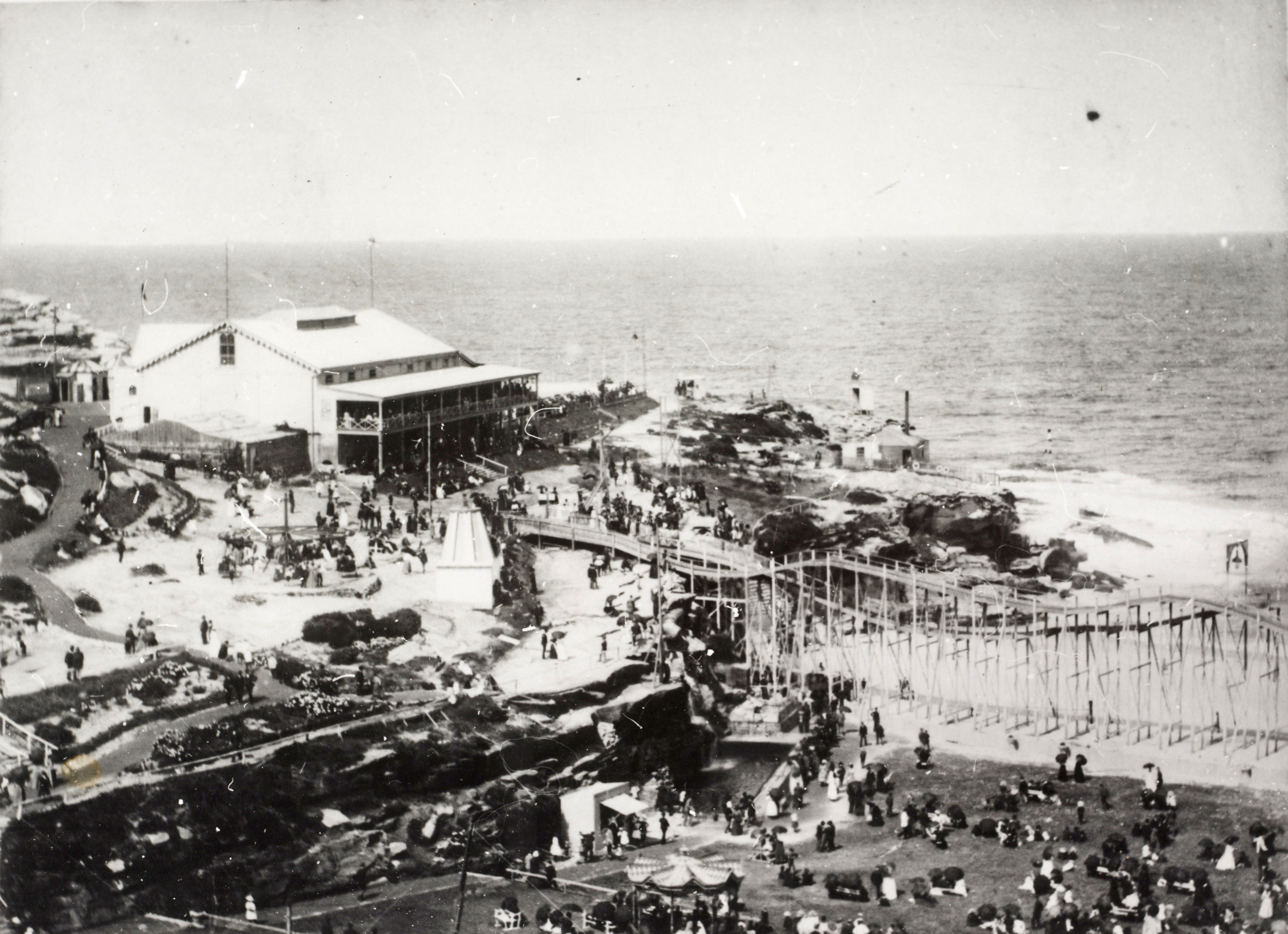
- Wonderland City and the Switchback Railway rollercoaster
- Interactive map of Wonderland City
- Location: Tamarama, New South Wales, Australia
- Coordinates: 33.89989°S 151.27112°E
- Opened: 1 December 1906
- Closed: 1911
- Owner: William Anderson
- General manager: Eric Salambo
- Area: 20 acres (8.1 ha)

Wonderland City was an amusement park located at Tamarama Beach in Sydney, Australia, opened on 1st December 1906 and closed in 1911. The park was 20 acres (8.1 ha), making it at the time the largest open air amusement park in the Southern Hemisphere. The park was operated by theatrical entrepreneur William Anderson, and its general manager was Eric Salambo, who was also the operator of Dreamland in Melbourne.

During its operation, attractions included a balloon rising approximately 3,800 feet (1,200 meters) high, a switchback railway, a two-mile (3.2km) long steam-driven miniature railway, an Alpine Slide, "Rivers of the World" (an Old Mill), a Seal Pond, an open air Roller Skating Ring and an American Shooting Gallery. It was operated by electric light powered by its own steam plant, and the whole area was covered with thousands of gaily coloured lamps and described as a Fairy City. The park also featured landscaping, including an artificial lake.

The first Surf "Gymkhana" Carnivals was held at Wonderland City (Tamarama Beach) organised by Bondi Surf Bathers' Life Saving Club on 11 February 1908. It was dogged by controversy for its attempts to use high barbed-wire fence to block local swimmers from accessing Tamarama Beach.

Before being occupied by the amusement park, Tamarama Park was the site of The Royal Aquarium and Pleasure Grounds, commonly called the Bondi Aquarium.
