= Ålandsparken =

Former amusement park in Mariehamn, Åland

- Interactive map of Ålandsparken
- Location: Möckelöbrinken 11, 22100 Mariehamn, Åland, Finland
- Coordinates: 60.0909°N 19.9321°E
- Status: Defunct
- Opened: 1984
- Closed: 2002
- Owner: Tom Forsbom
- Area: 1,500 m^{2} (16,000 sq ft)

Attractions
- Total: 15
- Roller coasters: 1
- Water rides: 2
- Website: Official website at the Wayback Machine (archived 2000-10-07)

Ålandsparken was an amusement park located in Mariehamn, Åland in Finland.

The park was relatively small, because Åland is a small area, both geographically and in terms of population number and density. The native population is probably too small to support a permanent amusement park, but Ålandsparken was located near the Western Harbour ferry terminal; thus attracting tourists coming from the mainland of Finland and Sweden. The annual number of visitors is said to have been around 40,000.

Ålandsparken had a number of amusement rides and around 60 different coin-operated penny arcade machines. In addition, there were other attractions in the area, such as mini golf. During its operating years, the park grew from the 1980s to the 1990s and was permanently closed in the 2000s. The reasons for the closure are to some extent unknown, but it is believed that the number of visitors was not enough to support the park financially.

There is a new park, called Mariepark, nearby and partly on the same location where Ålandsparken used to be. Mariepark is not, however, an amusement park like Ålandsparken. Mariepark has some restaurants and a festival area for concerts and other events, but there are no amusement rides in the area.

The old Ålandsparken rides are in fact still in place, in unusable condition, rusting and broken, making Ålandsparken an existing, but abandoned amusement park.

== Rides and attractions ==
=== Major rides ===
Name	Manufacturer	Model	Opened	Ride type
Bumper cars				Bumper cars
Nautic Jets				Nautic Jets
Super Hang				Paratrooper
Twister				Twister

=== Family rides ===
Name	Manufacturer	Model	Opened	Ride type
Mini Roller Coaster	Zamperla			Roller coaster

=== Kiddie rides ===
Name	Manufacturer	Model	Opened	Ride type
Bounce Castle				Bounce Castle
Elf Carousel				Carousel
Horse Carousel				Carousel
Major Tom				Ferris wheel
Mini Boats				Boat ride
Mini Jets				Carousel
Mini Teacups				Teacups
Mini Train				Train ride

=== Attractions ===
Name	Manufacturer	Model	Opened	Ride type
Disney Show				Walkthrough
Sleeping Beauty Castle				Walkthrough
