= Dinosaur Land =

Dinosaur Land may refer to:

- Dinosaur Land (Rügen), an amusement park with model dinosaurs on the German island of Rügen
- Dinosaur Land (Virginia), an amusement park with model dinosaurs in White Post, Virginia
- Dinosaur Land, the setting of the 1990 video game Super Mario World

== See also ==
- List of dinosaur parks
