= Dreamland (Melbourne amusement park) =

Defunct amusement park in St Kilda, Victoria

- Robson's Figure Eight, a side friction roller coaster which operated at Dreamland.
- Interactive map of Dreamland
- Location: St. Kilda, Melbourne, Victoria, Australia
- Coordinates: 37.868036°S 144.976369°E
- Status: Defunct
- Opened: 2 November 1906
- Closed: 1907
- Owner: Eric Salambo
- Operated by: Salambo Dreamland Amusements Ltd.
- Operating season: Summer

Attractions
- Total: 10+
- Roller coasters: 1

Dreamland was an Australian amusement park in the Melbourne suburb of St Kilda, which was opened on 2 November 1906. The park was unsuccessful, only operating for a single season. It was demolished in 1909, except for the Figure Eight rollercoaster which remained open until 1914. The park was located on the site of the current Luna Park Melbourne and Palais Theatre.

== History ==
The site of Dreamland in St Kilda was described by early settlers as swampland. The area's first use was as a tip, however when St Kilda's popularity increased as a seaside playground, the swamp was filled in and later became the site of a number of small independent amusements.

In the early 1900s, Eric Salambo and the Salambo and Ollivettes New Wonders Company toured Australia and New Zealand from England. Salambo, who would later be the general manager of Wonderland City in Sydney, secured the lease to a site in St Kilda in 1906 to build his own amusement park.

Dreamland opened on 2nd November 1906, operated by the newly founded Salambo Dreamland Amusements Ltd. The park had been inspired by the amusement parks of Coney Island, most notable in its recreation of Luna Park's A Trip to the Moon.

The park was overall unsuccessful, possibly related to the poor quality of attractions and high entrance price. Dreamland closed after one operating season, and wasn't demolished until 1909. The Figure 8 rollercoaster, located on the current site of the Palais Theatre, proved itself popular enough to not be removed. It operated as a standalone attraction until 1914. In 1912, Luna Park Melbourne was opened on its site, which remains operating to this day.

== Past attractions ==
- Robson's Figure Eight rollercoaster.
- "The Trip to the Moon" in the "Dreamland Airship"
- San Francisco earthquake and fire.
- Ascent of Fujiyama. with descent via either the.
  - "Down and Out".
  - or the "Bump the Bumps".
- Hereafter
- The Rivers of the World.
- "The Unseen World" with its mystic caves.
- Hall of Illusion.
- Grecian Theatre.

== See also ==
- Luna Park, Melbourne
