= Fantasy Glades =

Theme park in Port Macquarie, Australia

Fantasy Glades was a small theme park which operated until 28 April 2002 in Port Macquarie, Australia, due to the age and ill-health of partners and park operators George and Pat Spry, and because of economic concerns. The park operated for 35 years in its rainforest setting, catering by to a child-friendly clientele.

== History ==
Fantasy Glades was opened in 1968 by George and Rosemary Whitaker. In 1986, the park was sold to The Spry family and Brian Hutchinson, who operated the park until its closure in 2002, due to the age and ill-health of partners and park operators George and Pat Spry, and because of economic concerns. Some of the rides and attractions have since been purchased by Tony Williams who has plans to reopen the park in a new location on the Hastings River. As of 2006, this idea appears to be on hiatus.

Fantasy Glades was located at 44 Parklands Cl, Port Macquarie.

On 17 March 2008, the parkland became available to buy. The parkland is the only landsite of its kind in the beach side area of Port Macquarie.

Shane and Karen Hay of Queensland purchased the Fantasy Glades property in 2009 with the intent of re-opening the park in the near future, pending the necessary council approvals and funds permitting.

The Fantasy Glades site was purchased by Jeff Crowe in 2015. It is currently undergoing renovation and Council Approval processes with the aim of creating new environmentally friendly accommodation options for tourist's and traveler's to the Port Macquarie Region.

Jagwar Ma's debut album cover 'Howlin'' features the band's Jono Ma and his brother, director Dave Ma, in front of the Dragon.

== Attractions ==
Dragon at Fantasy Glades, before park closure

- Cinderella's Castle – a large pink castle with a walk-through attraction featuring life-size mannequins behind glass windows depicting the story of Cinderella. You would press a button at each window to light and animate the scene. One memorable scene featured the transformation of Cinderellas gown from rags to ball gown. The walkthrough led upstairs through the castle as well, including an outside section where you could stop and observe the park from the castle parapet. There was a side-section of the castle that had an arched tunnel the train-ride would pass through accompanied by coloured lights. At night this served as a parking garage where the train could be safely locked up.
- Witch's Cottage – a later addition, this wooden house had a large main room which you viewed through a large glass wall. When you pressed the button to activate the scene you observed a room filled with cobwebs, and other creepy things, many of which became animated (accompanied with recorded sounds) when you pressed the button. The witch stood over a cauldron, stirring her brew round and round, Spiders rose and fell just in front of you. It was humorous but too frightening for some small children.
- Snow White Diamond Mine – a large walk-through mine with a series of animated show-scenes that told the story of Snow White and the seven dwarves. some scenes (such as Snow White's flight through the forest) were lit with black-light, and others remained brightly lit. The animations were simple, but well done.
- Snow White Cottage – a miniature replica of the house where Snow White and the Seven Dwarves resided. Downstairs was the kitchen and living room, and upstairs there was the bedroom. The house was more child-sized, but adults could also enter (but had to duck their heads to avoid hitting the roof).
- Crooked House – a later addition, this was based on the tale of the crooked man who walked a crooked mile. It was a marvel of carpentry as there was not a single upright wall or post anywhere. The upstairs inside section had humorous animations of walls teetering in and out, workmen painting the room wobbling on ladders, and the floor was also at various angles. When you went downstairs, you could see a room featuring distorting mirrors
- Wishing Well
- Monorail – a later addition, this was a people-powered push-pull monorail which wound through the rainforest The carriages each held up to two persons, both facing toward the centre. Sometimes there were arguments as to which child would face forwards, and which backwards.
- Dinosaurs – a later addition. A series of Dinosaur sculptures near the Cinderella Castle
- Dragon – a large pink dragon whose eyes flashed and sprayed water and smoke from its nose at passers-by, accompanied by a loud sounds from a mechanical noisemaker, activated by infrared sensors – a later addition.
- Coin-powered cars – these tiny cars were designed for children to ride around a bitumen area, and could be operated by inserting a 20-cent coin
- Old Woman's Shoe – this large red shoe (approx 3 metres tall) was designed to represent the nursery rhyme There was an Old Woman Who Lived in a Shoe in which children could play
- Train – this electric road train circumnavigated the theme park on a loop
- Miniature Chapel – a tiny stone church. It is a genuinely ordained church and has hosted weddings on occasion. Organ music played on a loop inside, and the rear stained-glass window over the altar was back-lit. It was located next to Snow White Cottage, like Snow White Cottage while children could easily enter adults would need to duck their heads to enter.
- Hansel and Gretel – A glass-windowed shopfront depicting the story.
- Humpty Dumpty – A large figure of humpty dumpty that, when a button was pressed, fell backwards off his wall
- Little Red Riding Hood's Grandmother's house – with the big bad wolf dressed as grandma in bed.
- Kiddies Corner – a later addition, this was a selection of generic 'shopping mall' coin-operated rides
- Wildlife Park – Included Goats, Kangaroos, and Emus.
- Golden Goose – That laid a golden egg.
- Hickory Dickory Dock – A grandfather clock that a mouse would slowly climb up while the hands spun around. Once at the top, the clock would strike one, and the mouse ran down.
- Jack in the box – Press a button and he pops out.
- The mouse house – a small cave/burrow-like house with a cat painted on it, inside were robotic moving mice such as musical mice, fishing mice, dancing mice, mice ornaments, choral mice, family mice and mayor mouse. The mice were adult size, placed behind a glass screen and in front of a themed background. Press the button and the mice would move and/or sing.
- Dungeon – A foreboding wooden door around the back of Cinderellas castle had a wooden shuttered window with a hand-lettered sign next to a lever stating "Look if you dare". When you pulled the lever to open the shutter and looked in through the barred window, you observed a creepy, blacklight illuminated dungeon filled with cobwebs, and other creepy things, many of which became animated when you activated the lever. A pair of severed heads rotated on pillars, a spider rose and fell just in front of you. An creepy shrouded ghoul at the back of the dungeon suddenly lurched forward toward you. It took courage for a young child to peek in.
- Doll room – A room filled with a collection of beautifully detailed dolls from all around the world.
- Musical Piano Wall- A wall with touchable piano keys
- The three bears cottage/Blinky bills house
- Various little mushrooms to sit under
- Crocodile bridge – a bridge with a giant sized crocodile under it
- Pirates corner- a corner near the coin-operated cars with various pirate games e.g. -lift the gold out of the well
- Jack and the Beanstalk – Press a button to watch Jack Chop the beanstalk and the goose lay a golden egg
