= O'Neill's Adventureland =

Amusement park in New South Wales, Australia

- Interactive map of O'Neill's Adventureland
- Location: Edmondson Park, New South Wales, Australia
- Coordinates: 33°57′02″S 150°50′33″E

O'Neill's Adventureland was a small amusement park located in Edmondson Park, New South Wales, Australia.

The park was promoted in the 1970s and 1980s on television commercials with the lyric "Something for mum and something for dad, something for grandma and old grandad... at Adventureland".

The park operated under the name of Adventureland Sydney and was open throughout the year. Rides included the Warthog ghost train, giant slide, water slide, miniature train, dodgem cars and many more.

The park was used as a set for the television show Double the Fist. The rides at the park have also featured in movies such as Babe and Ghost Rider.

The park was also used extensively in the 1983 Australian drama Hostage, and was where the first section of the movie was based. This movie was known internationally as The Christine Maresch Story, and starred Judy Nunn and Kerry Mack.

The park now opens occasionally, operating only portable rides.
