= Manly Waterworks =

Water park in New South Wales

Manly Waterworks (formerly Manly Surf N Slide)
- Interactive map of Manly Waterworks (formerly Manly Surf N Slide)
- Location: Manly, New South Wales, Australia
- Coordinates: 33.799097°S 151.280924°E
- Website: www.manlywaterworks.com.au/

The Manly Waterworks was a water park in Manly, New South Wales, Australia. It was operated jointly with the Mount Druitt Waterworks and Cairns Waterworks, surviving after the later two became defunct.

Manly Waterworks was renamed to Manly Surf n Slide in December 2016 after spending over $150k to upgrade the site.

Manly Waterworks was demolished in 2026 to make way for extensions to the neighbouring Manly Pavilion.

Manly Waterworks features in the movie BMX Bandits starring Nicole Kidman during which an escape is staged in one of the waterslides.

== Attractions ==
- Three waterslides.
