= Lillom =

- Interactive map of Lillom
- Location: Lomme, France
- Coordinates: 50.65405°N 2.982975°E
- Opened: 10 June 1985
- Closed: 1987

Lillom was a theme park which was opened in 1985 in Lomme, near the city of Lille. The project was initiated by Arthur Notebart, then mayor of Lomme and president of the Urban Community of Lille. It was one of the first French theme parks, and its themes were the history of mankind from prehistory to the future. The park was organized around a large lake, in five main areas:

- Prehistoric area
- Medieval city
- Turn-of-the-century area
- World of the future

Its mascot was a green dinosaur, Lommy.

It closed in 1987 because it never turned any profit. Part of the park was destroyed to make way for the LGV Nord. The Middle-Ages city still exists today and houses a circus school.
