= Mill River East, Prince Edward Island =

Settlement in Prince Edward Island, Canada

Mill River East
- Settlement
- Location of Mill River East in Prince Edward Island
- Coordinates: 46.769°N 64.133°W
- Country: Canada
- Province: Prince Edward Island
- County: Prince County
- Time zone: UTC-04:00 (AST)

Mill River East is a settlement in Prince Edward Island.
