= Mount Druitt Waterworks =

Defunct water park in Australia

- Location: Mount Druitt, New South Wales, Australia
- Opened: 5 December 1981
- Closed: 27 March 1994
- Pools: A single pool
- Water slides: 6 water slides

Mount Druitt Waterworks was a water park in Mount Druitt, New South Wales, Australia. It was opened in 1981 and initially was very successful, however in later years costly upgrades and declining sales forced the park to close in 1994. It was operated jointly with the Manly Waterworks (1981) and Cairns Waterworks (1980). It was located at Stout Road, Mount Druitt, near the foot bridge on the northern side of the railway lines.

During the 1980s the television slogan was "the Waterworks will get you in the mood".

== Attractions ==
- Six Waterslides
- A 'beach' pool
- Bumper boats, later replaced by Go-Karts
- White water rapids
- The "Sky Dive" slippery dip (opened in 1988)

== See also ==
- Manly Waterworks
