= List of amusement parks in Asia =

The following is a list of notable amusement parks in Asia.

== Bahrain ==
=== Manama ===
- Adhari Park

== Bangladesh ==
=== Dhaka ===
- Fantasy Kingdom
- Shishu Park

=== Chittagong ===
- Foy's Lake Concord

== Brunei ==
- Jerudong Park, Bandar Seri Begawan, Brunei-Muara

== China ==
=== Anhui ===
- Fantawild Adventure, Wuhu

=== Beijing ===
- Beijing Shijingshan Amusement Park
- Happy Valley
- Universal Beijing Resort
  - Universal Studios Beijing
- World Chocolate Wonderland

=== Chongqing ===
- Fantawild Adventure, Chongqing

=== Guangdong ===
- Guangzhou Chimelong Tourist Resort:
  - Chimelong Paradise, Guangzhou
- Fantawild Adventure, Shantou
- Overseas Chinese Town:
  - China Folk Culture Village, Shenzhen
  - Window of the World, Shenzhen
  - Happy Valley, Shenzhen
  - Splendid China, Shenzhen
  - OCT East, Shenzhen
- Minsk World, Shenzhen (closed)
- Chimelong International Ocean Tourist Resort:
  - Chimelong Ocean Kingdom, Zhuhai
- Lionsgate Entertainment World, Zhuhai

=== Heilongjiang ===
- Volga Manor, Harbin

=== Jiangsu ===
- Happy Valley Nanjing
- China Dinosaurs Park, Changzhou
- World Joyland, Wujin

=== Liaoning ===
- Dalian Discovery Kingdom, Dalian

=== Sichuan ===
- Happy Valley Chengdu, Chengdu

=== Shanghai ===
- Jinjiang Action Park (Jinjiang Leyuan)
- Shanghai Disney Resort
  - Shanghai Disneyland
- Shanghai Haichang Ocean Park
- Legoland Shanghai

=== Zhejiang ===
- Romon U-Park, Ningbo
- Six Flags Zhejiang, Haiyan County

== Hong Kong ==
- Hong Kong Disneyland, Lantau Island
- Hong Kong Wetland Park, Yuen Long, New Territories
- Ma Wan Park, Lantau Island
- Ocean Park Hong Kong, Hong Kong Island
- Snoopy's World, Shatin, New Territories

== India ==
=== Delhi ===
- Metro Walk

=== Gujarat ===
- Amaazia, Surat

=== Kerala ===
- Wonderla, Kochi
- Mango Meadows, Kottayam
- Vismaya, Kannur
- Malampuzha Dam, Palakkad

=== Maharashtra ===
- Adlabs Imagica, Khopoli
- Snow Kingdom, Mumbai

=== Tamil Nadu ===
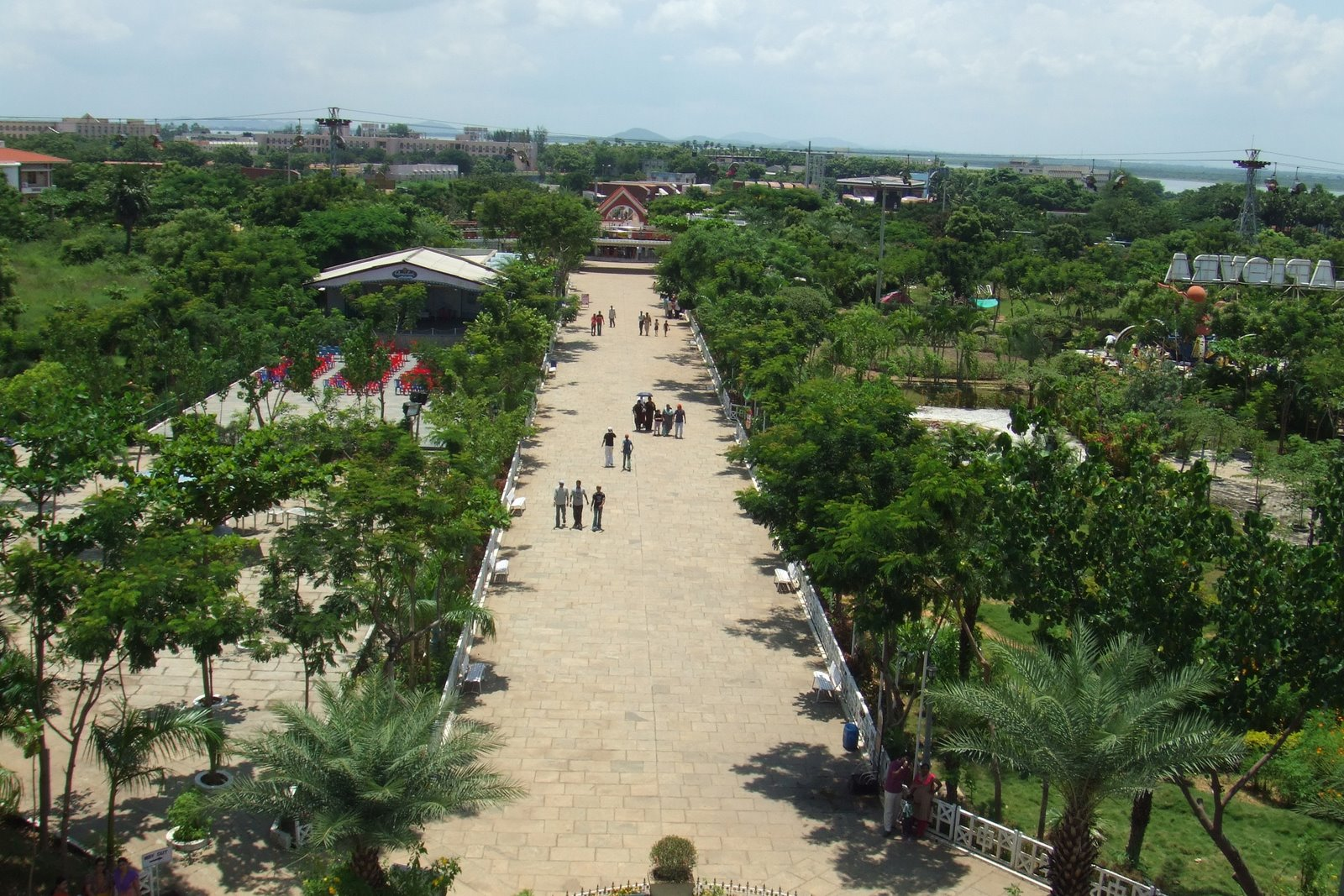
Aerial view of Queen's Land

==== Chennai ====
- Dash n Splash (closed)
- Kishkinta
- MGM Dizzee World
- Queen's Land
- Snow Kingdom
- VGP Universal Kingdom

==== Coimbatore ====
- Kovai Kondattam
- Black Thunder
- Maharaja Theme Park

==== Madurai ====
- Athisayam

=== Telangana ===
==== Hyderabad ====
- Jalavihar
- Ramoji Film City
- Snow World
- Wonderla

=== Tripura ===
- Agartala Amusement Park, Agartala (closed)

=== Uttar Pradesh ===
- Worlds of Wonder Amusement Park, Noida

=== West Bengal ===
==== Kolkata ====
- Aquatica
- Eco Park
- Nicco Park
- Science City

=== Bangalore ===
- Wonderla

=== Andhra Pradesh ===
- Fun Park

== Indonesia ==
=== Bali ===
- Bali Safari and Marine Park, Gianyar
- Bali Zoo, Gianyar
- Garuda Wisnu Kencana Cultural Park, Badung
- Trans Studio Theme Park, Denpasar

=== Banten ===
- World of Wanders Theme Park, Tangerang

=== Central Java ===
- Dusun Semilir, Semarang
- Saloka, Semarang
- Solo Safari, Surakarta

=== East Java ===
- Jawa Timur Park, Batu
- KidZania Surabaya, Surabaya
- Taman Safari II, Pasuruan

=== Jakarta ===
- Ancol Dreamland
- Dunia Fantasy (Dufan) – Part of the Ancol Dreamland complex
- KidZania Jakarta
- Mall of Indonesia
- Taman Mini Indonesia Indah
- Trans Studio Cibubur, Trans Studio Mall Cibubur, Cibubur

=== North Sumatra ===
- Hillpark Sibolangit, Deli Serdang Regency
- Mikie Funland, Karo Regency

=== South Sulawesi ===
- Trans Studio Makassar, Trans Studio Mall Makassar, Makassar

=== West Java ===
- Jungleland, Sentul City, Bogor
- Taman Buah Mekarsari, Bekasi
- Taman Safari I, Bogor
- Taman Wisata Matahari, Bogor
- Transpark Snow World, Bekasi
- Trans Studio Bandung, Trans Studio Mall Bandung, Bandung

=== Yogyakarta ===
- Taman Pintar Yogyakarta, Yogyakarta

== Iran ==
=== Tehran ===
- Eram Park

=== Isfahan ===
- Dream land

== Israel ==
=== Rishon LeZion ===
- Superland

=== Tel Aviv ===
- Luna Park

== Japan ==
=== Aichi Prefecture ===
- Ghibli Park, Nagakute
- Lagunasia, Gamagōri
- Legoland Japan Resort, Nagoya

=== Chiba Prefecture ===
==== Urayasu ====
- Tokyo Disney Resort
  - Tokyo Disneyland
  - Tokyo DisneySea

=== Fukuoka Prefecture ===
==== Kitakyūshū ====
- Space World, Yahata Higashi

=== Hokkaidō ===
- Rusutsu Resort, Rusutsu, Abuta

==== Asahikawa ====
- Asahiyama Zoo

=== Hyogo Prefecture ===
==== Himeji ====
- Himeji Central Park

=== Kanagawa Prefecture ===
- Yokohama Cosmo World, Yokohama

=== Kyoto Prefecture ===
- Shigureden, Kyoto

=== Mie Prefecture ===
- Nagashima Spa Land, Kuwana

=== Nagasaki Prefecture ===
- Huis Ten Bosch, Sasebo, Nagasaki

=== Osaka Prefecture ===
==== Osaka ====
- Festivalgate (defunct)
- Universal Studios Japan

=== Saitama Prefecture ===
- Seibuen Amusement park, Tokorozawa
- Tobu Zoo, Miyashiro

=== Tokyo ===
- Hanayashiki, Taitō
- Joypolis, Minato
- Namco Namja Town, Toshima
- Sanrio Puroland, Tama
- Tama Tech, Hino
- Tokyo Dome City
- Yomiuriland, Inagi
- Kidzania Tokyo
- Tokyo Dome City Attractions, Bunkyo
- Yokohama Cosmo World, Yokohama

=== Yamanashi Prefecture ===
- Fuji-Q Highland, Fujiyoshida, Yamanashi

== Kazakhstan ==
- Tetysblu Theme Park, Aktau

== Kuwait ==
=== Kuwait City ===
- Kuwait Entertainment City, Doha
- KidZania, The Avenues

== Malaysia ==
=== Kuala Lumpur ===
- Berjaya Times Square Theme Park

=== Pahang ===
- Berjaya Hills Resort, Bukit Tinggi

==== Genting Highlands ====
- Genting SkyWorlds

=== Selangor ===
- Kidzania Kuala Lumpur, Mutiara Damansara
- Sunway Lagoon, Subang Jaya

=== Kedah ===
- Bandar Darulaman Water Theme Park, Jitra

=== Malacca ===
- A' Famosa Resort
- Malacca Wonderland
- Malaysia Heritage Studios

=== Perak ===
- Lost World of Tambun
- MAPS Perak

=== Johor ===
- Legoland Malaysia Resort

=== Terengganu ===
- Islamic Heritage Park

== Myanmar ==
=== Yangon ===
- Yangon Zoological Garden

== Nepal ==
=== Bagmati Province ===
- Kathmandu Fun Park, Bhrikutimandap
- Kathmandu Fun Valley, Suryabinayak
- Whoopee Land Amusement and Water Park, Chobar

=== Gandaki Province ===
- Pokhara Disneyland, Pokhara

=== Koshi Province ===
- Gopal Fun Park, Biratnagar

== North Korea ==
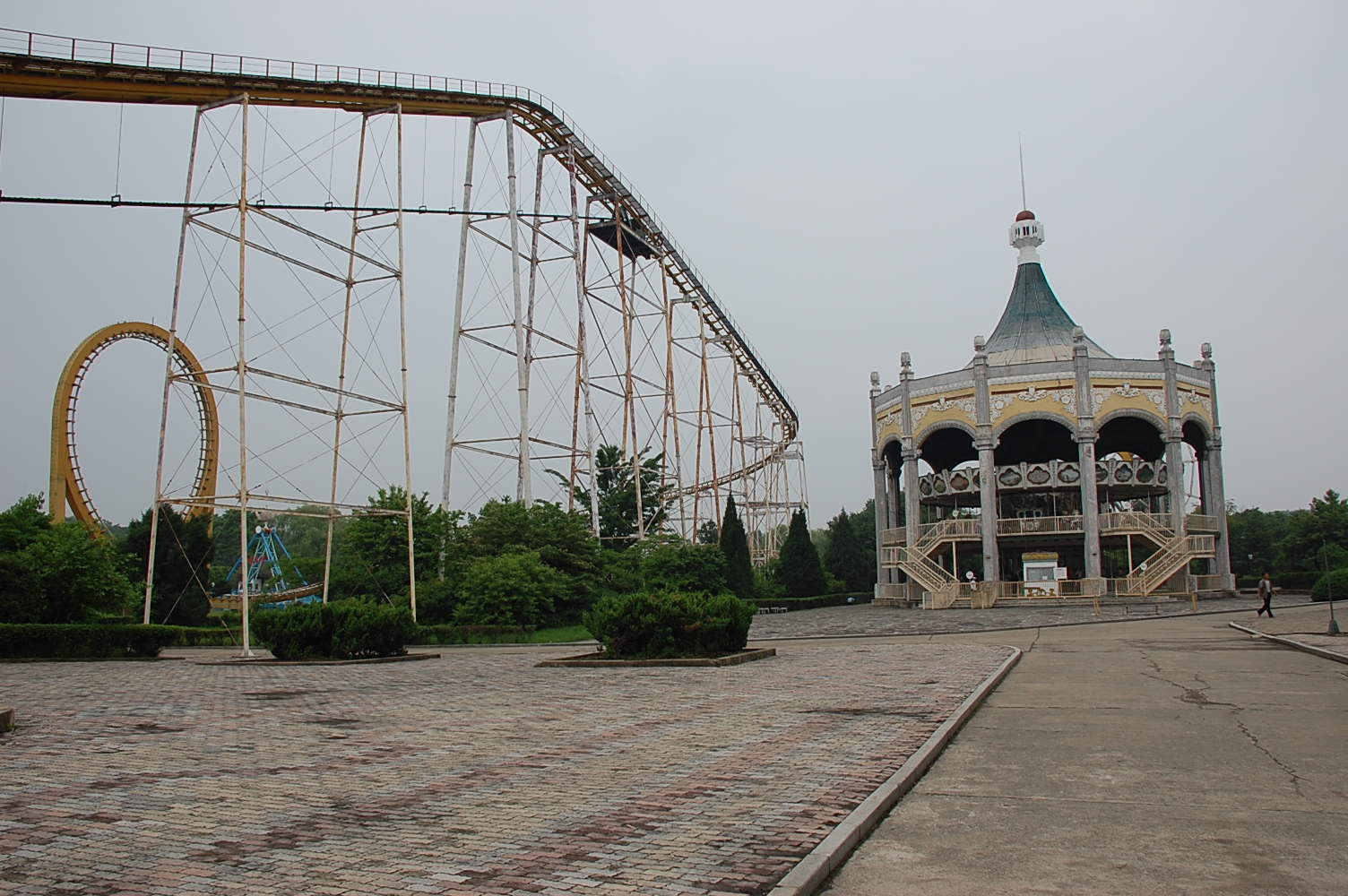
Mangyongdae Funfair, Pyongyang

=== Pyongyang ===
- Kaeson Youth Park
- Mangyongdae Funfair
- Munsu Funfair
- Pyongyang Folklore Park
- Rungra People's Pleasure Ground
- Taesongsan Funfair

== Pakistan ==
- Go Aish, Karachi
- Jinnah Park, Rawalpindi
- Joyland, Lahore
- Jungle World, Rawalpindi
- Lake View Park, Islamabad
- Shakarparian, Islamabad
- Sindbad Amusement Parks

== Philippines ==
=== Metro Manila ===
==== Marikina ====
- ChristmaSaya Carnival (September to February yearly)

==== Pasay ====
- DreamPlay
- SM By the Bay Amusement Park
- Star City

==== Taguig ====
- KidZania Manila (Closed)

==== Quezon City ====
- Circle of Fun
- ABS-CBN Studios Experience (Closed)
- Fiesta Carnival

=== Luzon ===
==== Benguet ====
- Sky Ranch, Baguio

==== Camarines Sur ====
- Camsur Watersports Park, Pili, Camarines Sur

==== Cavite ====
- Sky Ranch, Tagaytay

==== Laguna ====
- Enchanted Kingdom, Santa Rosa, Laguna

==== Nueva Ecija ====
- Carron Dream Park, San Isidro, Nueva Ecija

==== Pampanga ====
- Sky Ranch, San Fernando, Pampanga

==== Cebu ====
- Anjo World, Minglanilla, Cebu

==== Negros Occidental ====
- Magikland, Silay, Negros Occidental

==== Zamboanga del Norte ====
- Glorious Fantasyland, Dapitan, Zamboanga del Norte

== Qatar ==
=== Doha ===
- KidZania, Aspire Park
- Doha Quest

== Singapore ==
- Gardens by the Bay, Marina South
- Haw Par Villa, Queenstown
- Mandai Wildlife Reserve, Mandai
  - Bird Paradise
  - Night Safari
  - River Wonders
  - Singapore Zoo
- Resorts World Sentosa, Sentosa
  - Marine Life Park
  - Universal Studios Singapore
  - KidZania Singapore
- Snow City, Jurong

== South Korea ==
=== Gangwon Province ===
- Legoland Korea
- 365 Safe Town

=== Gyeonggi-do ===
- Seoul Land
- Everland

=== Gyeongsangbuk-do ===
- Geumo Land, Gumi
- Gyeongju World, Gyeongju

=== Incheon ===
- Paramount Movie Park Korea

=== Seoul ===
- Lotte World

== Saudi Arabia ==
=== Jeddah ===
- Al-Shallal Theme Park
- Atallah Happy Land Park
- Moon Toon

=== Riyadh ===
- Al Hokair Land
- Beast Land (closed in 2025)
- Boulevard World

=== Qiddiya ===
- Six Flags Qiddiya City

== Sri Lanka ==
=== Western Province ===
- Diyatha Uyana
- Galle Face Green
- Viharamahadevi Park

== Taiwan ==
- Bada Forest Paradise, Chaojhou Township, Pingtung County
- E-DA Theme Park, Dashu, Kaohsiung
- Farglory Ocean Park, Shoufeng, Hualien County
- Formosa Fun Coast, Bali District, New Taipei
- Formosan Aboriginal Culture Village, Yuchi, Nantou County
- Janfusun Fancyworld, Gukeng, Yunlin County
- Leofoo Village Theme Park, Guanxi, Hsinchu County
- Lihpao Land, Houli District, Taichung
- Otherworld, Dalin, Chiayi
- SKM Park, Cianjhen District, Kaohsiung
- Taipei Children's Amusement Park, Shilin District, Taipei
- West Lake Resortopia, Sanyi, Miaoli County
- Window on World Theme Park, Longtan, Taoyuan City
- Yehliu Ocean World, Wanli, New Taipei
- Zhudong Animation and Comic Creative Park, Jhudong Township, Hsinchu County

== Thailand ==
=== Bangkok ===
- Dan Neramit (Magic Land), Phahon Yothin, Chatuchak - now defunct
- Happy Land, Bangkapi - now defunct
- KidZania Bangkok, Siam Paragon, Pathum Wan - now defunct
- Safari World, Ramindra Km.9
- Siam Park City, Seri Thai

=== Chiang Mai Province ===
- Chiang Mai Night Safari, Ratchaphruck, Mae Hia
- Chiang Mai Zoo, Suthep

==== Pattaya City ====
- Mini Siam, Pattaya

=== Pathum Thani Province ===
- Dream World, Rangsit Khlong 3

=== Phuket Province ===
- Phuket FantaSea, Kamala Beach

== Turkmenistan ==
- World of Turkmenbashi Tales, Ashgabat

== United Arab Emirates ==
=== Abu Dhabi ===
- Ferrari World Abu Dhabi
- Warner Bros. World Abu Dhabi
- SeaWorld Abu Dhabi
- Yas Waterworld Abu Dhabi

=== Dubai ===
- IMG Worlds of Adventure
- Dubai Parks and Resorts
  - Legoland Dubai
  - Real Madrid World
  - Motiongate Dubai

==== Dubai: planned or cancelled ====
- Six Flags Dubai (late 2019) Was scheduled to open in 2017.
- Dubailand (2020)
  - Sahara Kingdom (suspended) Within the Dubailand complex, construction was suspended by 2016.
  - Universal Studios Dubailand project was cancelled in 2016
  - F1-X Dubai project was suspended by 2016

=== Sharjah ===
- Adventureland

== Uzbekistan ==
=== Tashkent ===
- Anhor Park
- Central Park Tashkent
- Tashkentland

== Vietnam ==
- Asia Park, Da Nang – Part of the Sun World Complex
- Đại Nam Văn Hiến, Binh Duong
- Đầm Sen Park, Ho Chi Minh City
- Dragon Park Ha Long, Ha Long
- Sun World Ba Na Hills, Da Nang – Part of the Sun World Complex
- Suối Tiên Amusement Park, Ho Chi Minh City
- VinWonders Cua Ho, Vinh
- VinWonders Nam Hoi An, Da Nang
- VinWonders Nha Trang, Nha Trang
- VinWonders Phu Quoc, Phu Quoc

== See also ==
- List of amusement parks
- List of water parks in Asia
