= Mangyongdae Funfair =

Amusement park in Mangyongdae-guyok

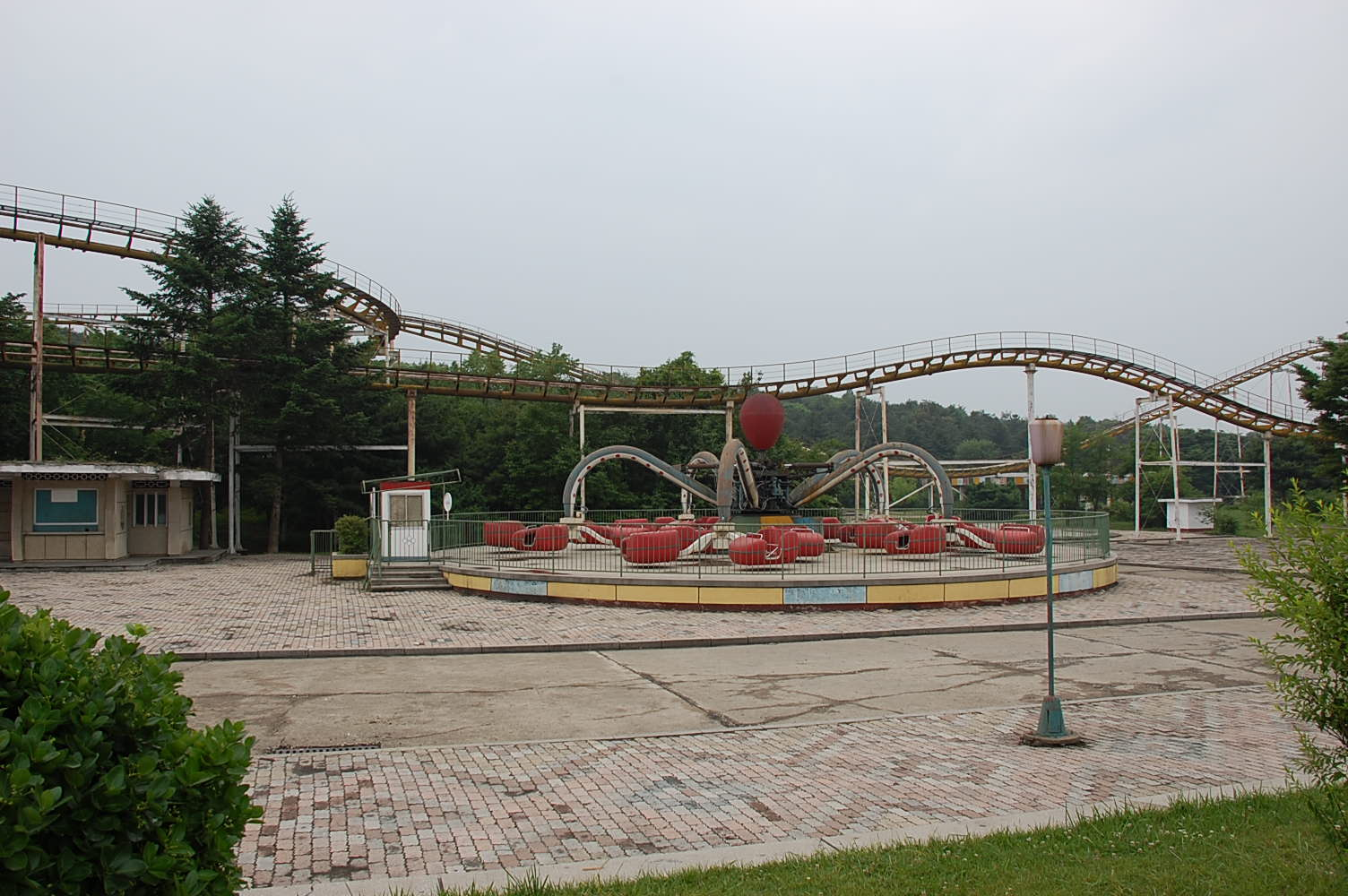
- Interactive map of Mangyongdae Funfair
- Location: Mangyongdae-guyok, North Korea
- Coordinates: 39°0′25.41″N 125°39′4.24″E
- Opened: April 15, 1982
- Operating season: Year-round

The Mangyongdae Funfair (Korean: 만경대유희장) is an amusement park located in Mangyongdae-guyok, 12 kilometres from Pyongyang, North Korea. It has an area of 70 hectares including a funfair and wading pool. In autumn 2011 the funfair was reported to have little or no Korean patronage. It has been alleged that there is a lack of genuine customers with many visitors being bussed in to the attraction. It had a roller coaster, which, while operational, was in poor repair. It has a daily capacity of 100,000 people and there is a merry-go-round and a ridable miniature railway.

The dismal atmosphere and run-down condition of the funfair were severely criticized by Kim Jong Un, during an inspection in May 2012. Kim Jong Un ordered Choe Ryong-hae, Director of the General Political Bureau of the Korean People's Army, and others, to spruce up the funfair and bring it into compliance with the requirements of the Sŏn'gun era. Kim Jong Un used the occasion to emphasize the requirement that officials have the spirit of serving the people and must abandon outdated ideological points of view and outmoded work-styles.

== Other parks ==
The Kaeson Youth Park is another amusement park in Pyongyang which also underwent innovation. The Taesongsan Fun Fair, opened in 1977, at the foot of Mount Taesong is another. The Pyongyang Folklore Park with a historical theme, also at Mount Taesong in Pyongyang, has been under construction since December, 2008. There are also folk parks in Sukchon, South Pyongan Province and Sariwon, North Hwanghae Province. South Korean folk parks with an historical theme such as Korean Folk Village are popular attractions.

== See also ==
- List of amusement parks in North Korea
