= Queens Land =

Amusement park in India

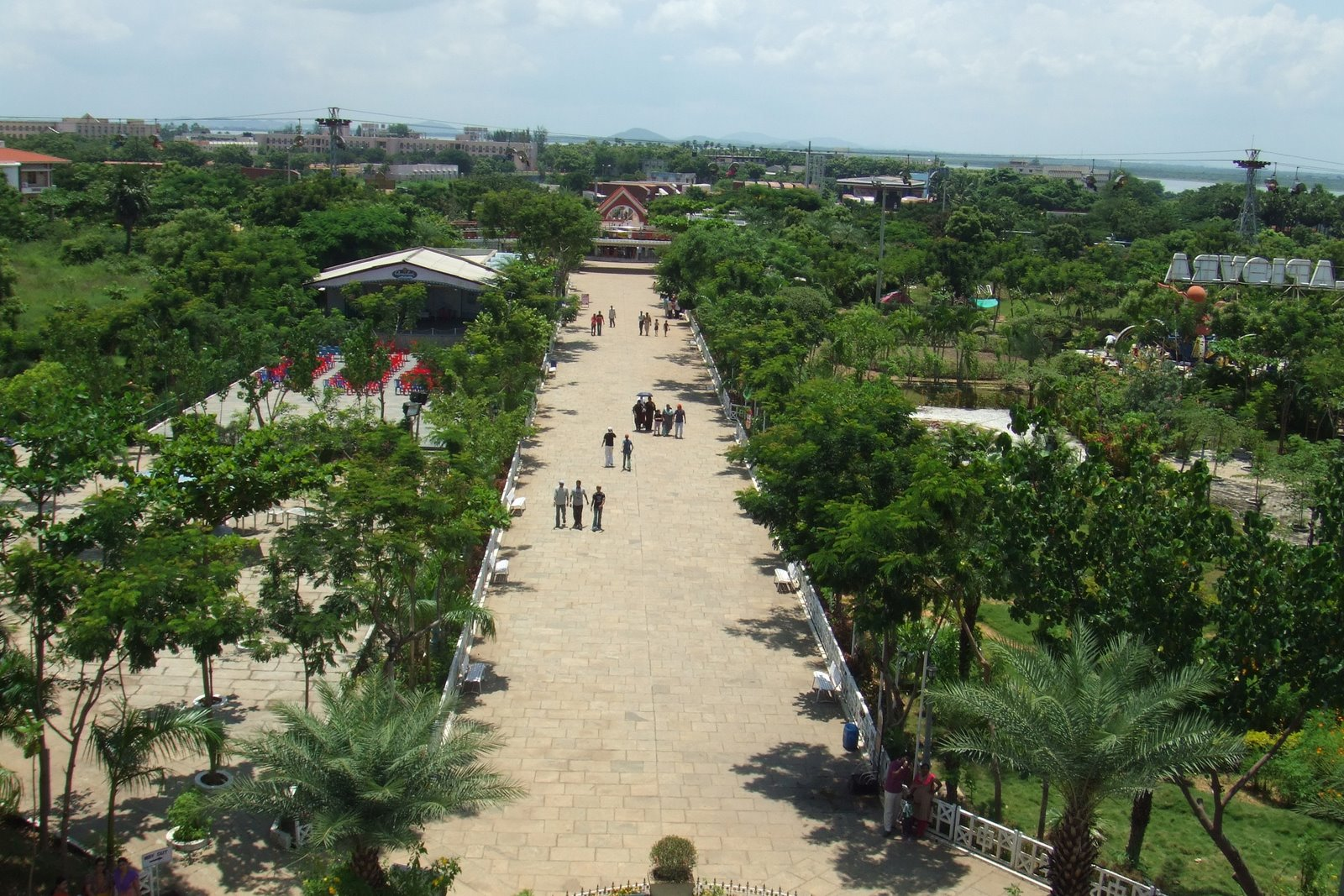
- Aerial view
- Interactive map of Queens Land
- Location: Bangalore Trunk Road(NH4), Kuthambakkam, Poonamallee, Chennai, Tiruvallur - 600124, India
- Coordinates: 13.029374°N 80.028818°E
- Opened: August 2003; 22 years ago
- Area: 70 acres (28 ha)

Attractions
- Total: 51
- Roller coasters: 2
- Website: queenslandamusementpark.com

Queens Land is a theme park in Poonamallee, Chennai, India, covering 70 acres (28 hectares). It opened in August 2003.

== General information ==
The park is located by the Chennai-Bangalore Trunk Road between Sriperumpudhur and Poonamalle. There is parking for cars. Buses are available from Guindy and T. Nagar. All buses going to Sriperumpudhur from Chennai stop at Queens Land.

== Rides ==
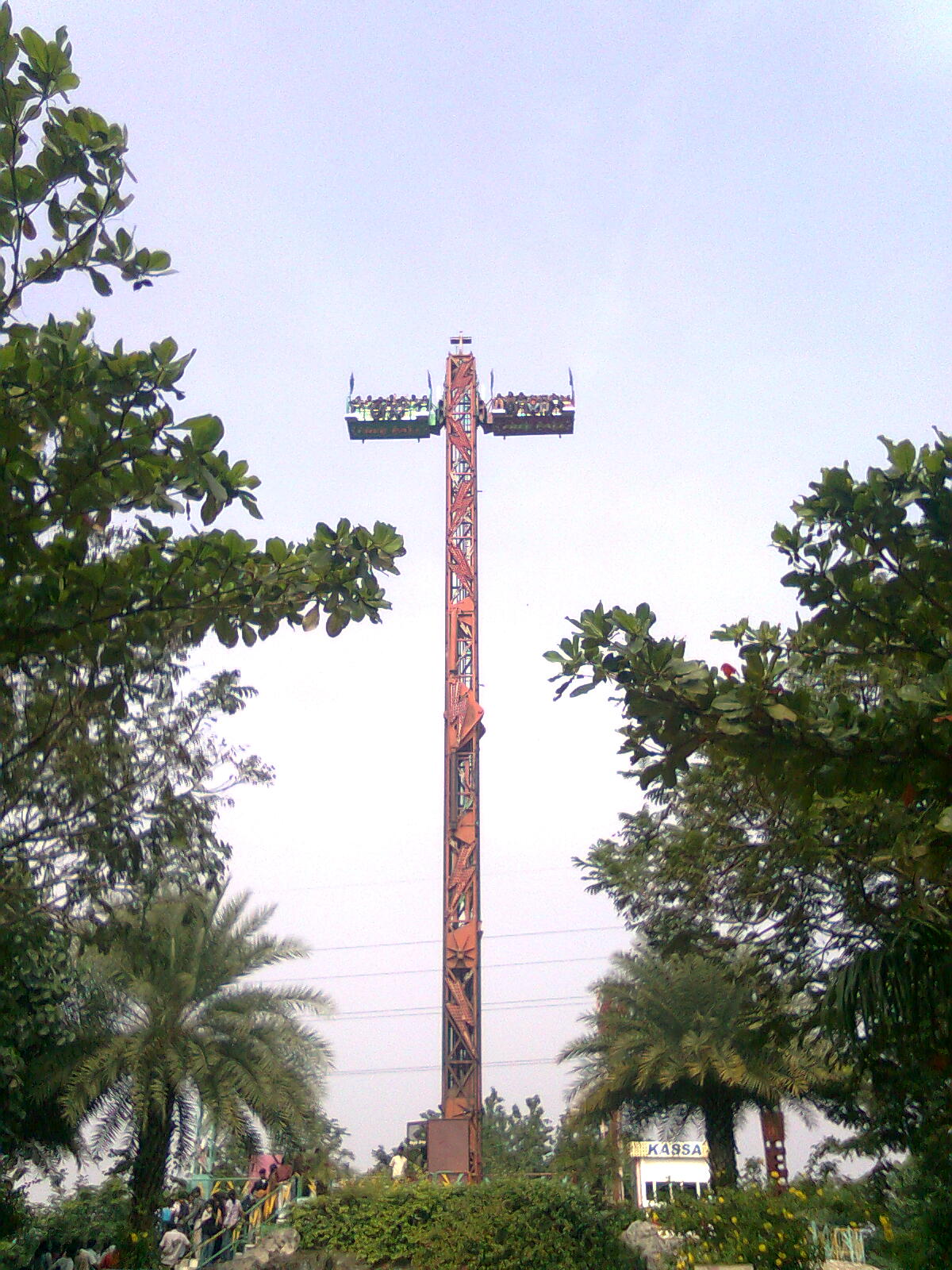
Free Fall Tower- the flagship ride of Queens Land

There are 51 rides, 33 for adults and 18 for children. A child may go on some adult rides if accompanied by an adult. The rides include: Free Fall Tower, and Super waves. There are some water rides, which operate during afternoon hours. There are also separate swimming pools for women. They offer a variety of dry and wet rides.

== Incidents ==
The park was closed for few weeks in 2008 due to a collision that resulted in the death of an 11-year-old girl while she was riding in a boat in the lake. Seven employees were arrested in connection with the death.

On 18 June 2019, 12 people were injured when the cables holding the right platform of the free fall tower snapped while the ride was descending, causing the riders to plunge 10 feet (3.0 m) to the ground. First aid was administered and no serious injuries were sustained. Following the incident, the park has been ordered to close indefinitely due to ride safety concerns.

== See also ==
- MGM Dizzee World, Chennai
- VGP Universal Kingdom, Chennai
- Dash n Splash, water park in Chennai
- Kishkinta, Chennai
- Black Thunder, Coimbatore
- Kovai Kondattam, Coimbatore
- Athisayam, Madurai
