= List of tourist attractions in Madurai =

This is the list of tourist attractions in Madurai, a city in Tamil Nadu state of India:

- Meenakshi Temple
- Aayiram Kaal Mandapam or Thousand Pillared Hall
- Vandiyur Mariamman Teppakulam
- Kallazhagar Temple
- Thiruparankundram Murugan temple
- Koodal Azhagar Temple
- Pazhamudircholai
- Thirumalai Nayakkar Mahal
- Gandhi Memorial Museum, Madurai
- Thiruparankundram Dargah
- Vaigai Dam
- Samanar Hills
- Kutladampatti Falls
- Athisayam

== Gallery ==
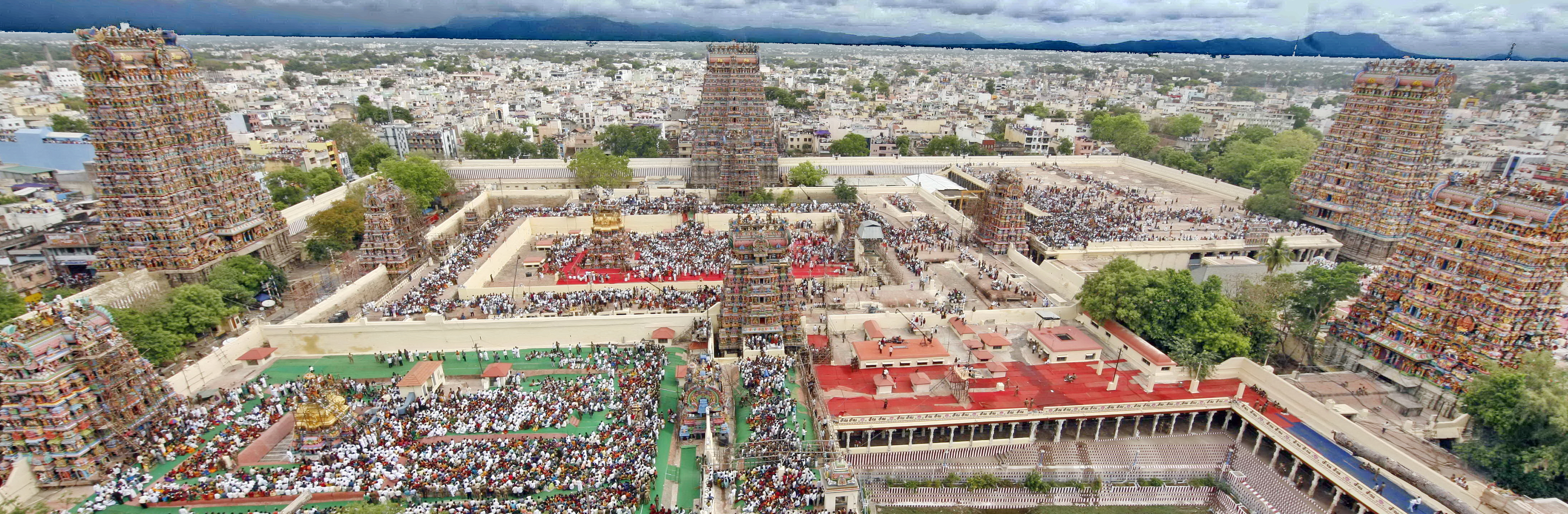
An aerial view of the compound of Meenakshi Temple from the top of the southern gopuram, looking north.

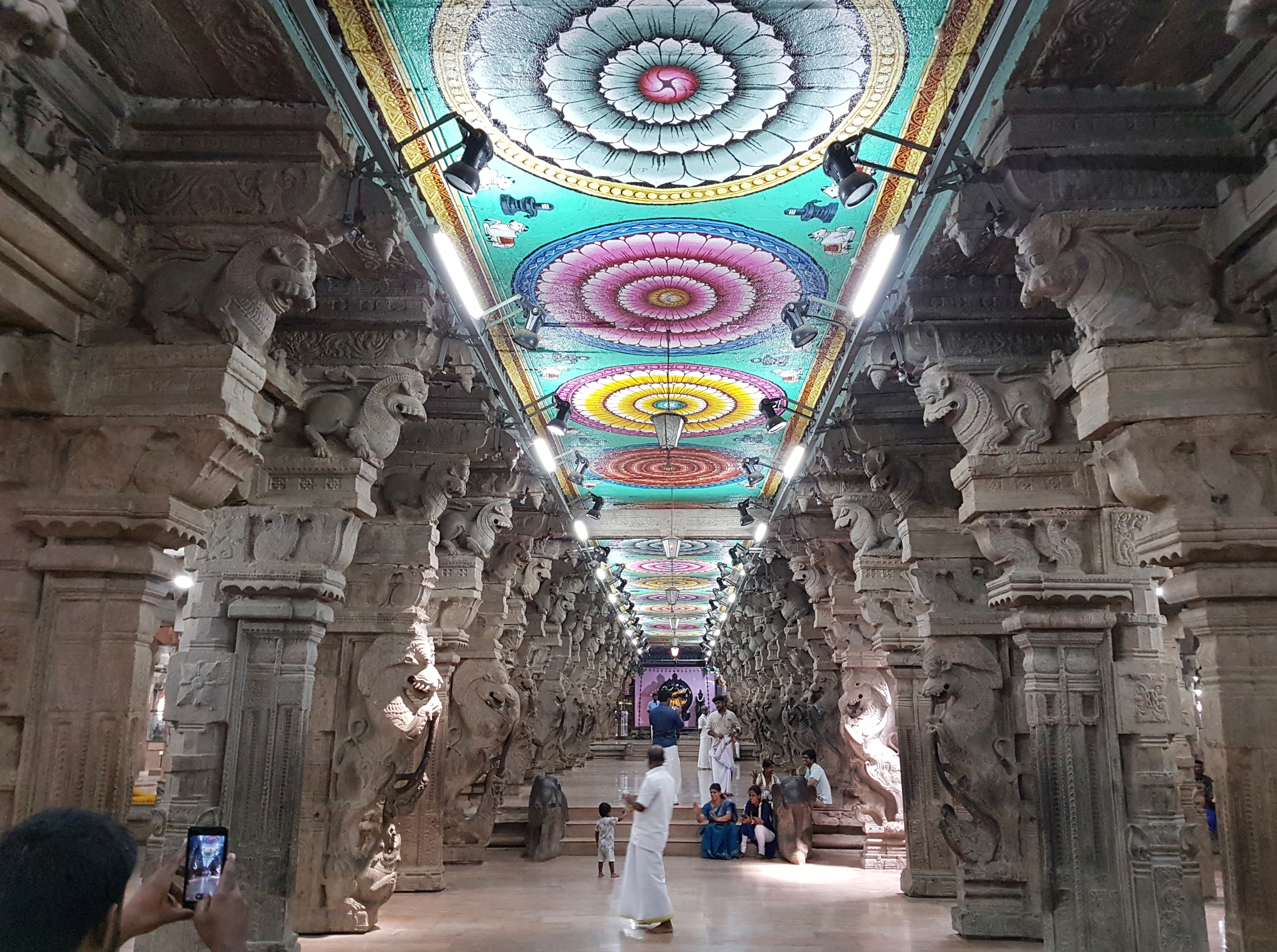
