= Korea Central Zoo =

Zoo in Pyongyang, North Korea

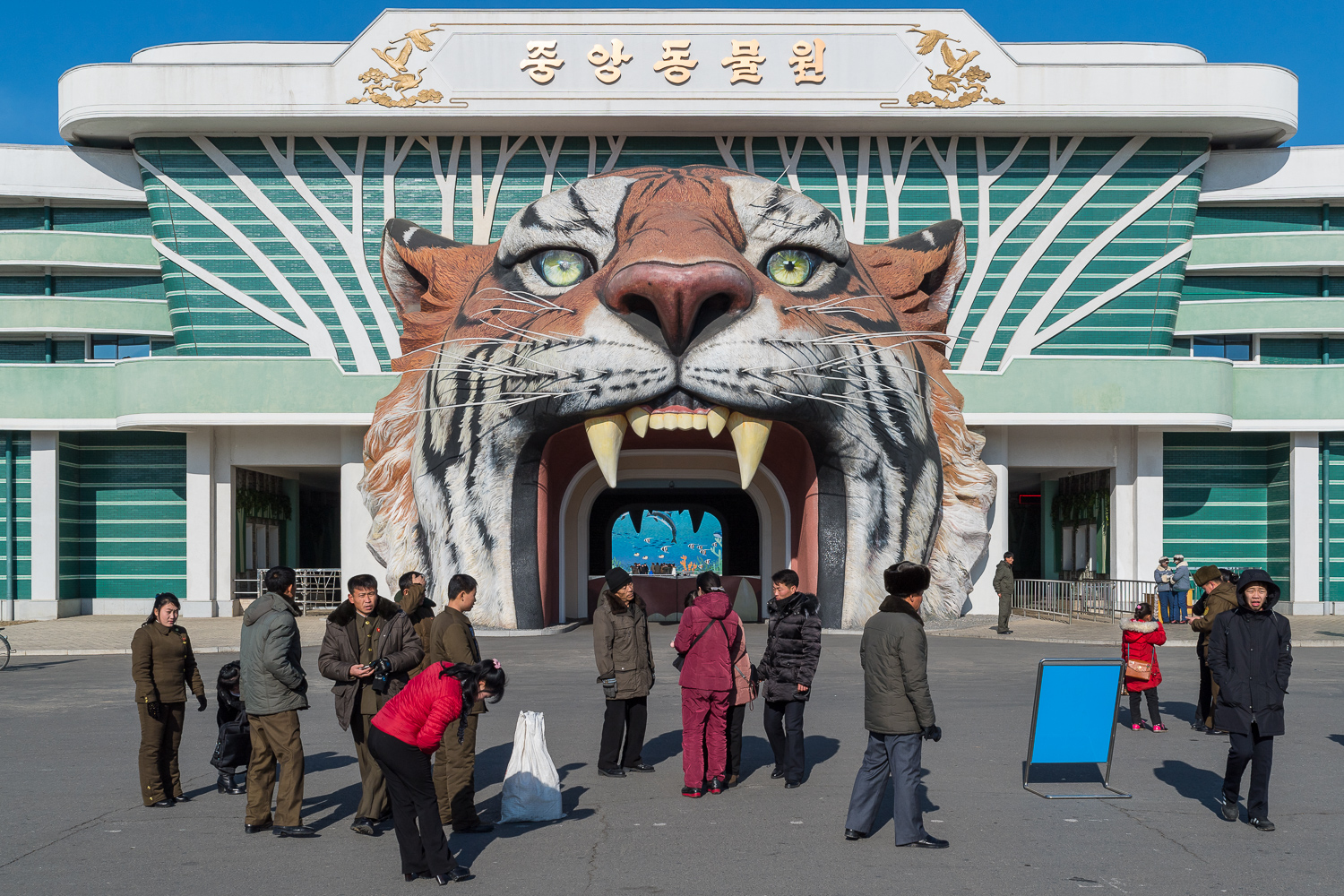
- Entrance to the Korea Central Zoo in Pyongyang in the shape of a tiger's head, 2018
- Interactive map of Korea Central Zoo
- 39°04′30″N 125°48′54″E
- Date opened: April 1960
- Location: Taesŏng-guyŏk, Pyongyang, North Korea
- Land area: 1 km^{2} (250 acres)
- No. of animals: 5000+
- No. of species: 650
- Public transit: Hyŏksin: Ragwŏn
- Website: http://www.kza.org.kp/

- Korea Central Zoo
- Hangul: 조선중앙동물원
- Hanja: 朝鮮中央動物園
- RR: Joseon jungang dongmurwon
- MR: Chosŏn chungang tongmurwŏn

The Korea Central Zoo, also referred to as the Pyongyang Central Zoo, is the national zoo of North Korea. Opened in April 1960, it is located near Taesŏngsan mountain in downtown Pyongyang, and covers an area of roughly one square kilometre. The zoo has over 5,000 wild animals, comprising a total of 650 species, including elephants, domestic dogs, and chimpanzees. Though the zoo participates in species recovery efforts through breeding programs, it has been criticized for its treatment of animals, especially in the case of Azalea, a chimp who was taught to smoke. Accusations of the starvation, neglect, and inbreeding of animals have also been made.

In January 2025, the zoo launched an English-language official website.

== History ==
The zoo opened in April 1960, within Taesŏngsan Park. Among its earliest animal residents were Vietnamese-born elephants, donated by Ho Chi Minh; the descendants of these elephants still live in the zoo. Other early attractions included peacocks, and a family of monkeys, said to be its top attraction. In 1965, the zoo was gifted with a pair of giant pandas, one male and one female, by the Beijing Zoo. By 1971, it had obtained another pair. The pandas remained there until 1980.

The Korea Central Zoo has exchanged animals with international zoos as a show of diplomacy. In 1986, the zoo gave a number of animals, including water deer and wolves, to the Kyoto City Zoo; in return, the Japanese zoo sent a llama, a red kangaroo, and a wood duck. At the 2000 summit between Kim Jong Il and Kim Dae-jung, the former gave a pair of Jindo dogs, named Peace and Reunification, to the zoo; they produced a litter of five puppies in September 2001. In exchange, Kim Jong Il gave a pair of Pungsan puppies.

The Korea Central Zoo also had a history with Zimbabwean president Robert Mugabe, beginning In the 1980s when Mugabe donated two rhinoceroses to the zoo. These animals, a male and female, died shortly after arrival. In 2010, Mugabe sent several animals from Hwange National Park to the zoo, including giraffes, hyenas, zebras and antelope, with North Korea covering the cost of capture and transport. This was criticized by conservationists around the world, especially the decision to import two unweaned elephant calves. During a 2013 visit to the zoo, journalist John Sweeney noted a warthog donated by Mugabe as being among the animals he saw, along with several chimpanzees donated from Suharto of Indonesia.

The Central Zoo conducted its first zoo exchange with South Korean zoos in April 2005, in which they received llamas and hippopotamuses, among other species of animals. Many of the animals sent south, which included Asiatic black bears, African ponies, and Siberian weasels, were first quarantined by South Korea before being shipped to their destinations.

In late 2024, over 70 animals were reportedly given by Russia to the zoo, including one lion, two brown bears, two yaks, five cockatoos, pheasants, and mandarin ducks. In February 2026, the state-owned media outlet Voice of Korea announced that the zoo's sacred baboons were "on the increase."

The zoo has long had a direct relationship with North Korea's presidents. After the death of Kim Il-Sung in 1994, his pet dogs were moved to the zoo. Three months after Kim Jong-Il suffered a stroke in 2008, the Korean Central News Agency released undated photos of him at the zoo, purporting to show him in good health. Both Kim Jong-Un and his wife, Ri Sol Ju, visit the zoo often and take publicity photos there. These photos have been criticized as propaganda; for example, David Alton wrote of a publicity stunt in which Kim Jong-Un fed zoo animals "in a country where parents struggle to feed their children."

== Attractions ==
An indoor room at the zoo, featuring dinosaur sculptures

The Central Korean Zoo keeps a variety of non-indigenous species of animals, including 400 given as gifts by heads of state and other foreign citizens. A significant number of those were the gift of a single Swedish citizen, Jonas Wahlström, director of the Skansen Aquarium; they are housed in the Animal Museum, which opened as a new exhibit in 1985.

A turtle-shaped building at the zoo

The Central Zoo has a Dog Pavilion, with several breeds of domestic dogs on display. Dogs, though common in North Korea's countryside, have been banned in Pyongyang twice (once until 1989, then again in 2011) for cleanliness reasons, thus making these an unusual sight for the city's residents. The first dogs to be displayed were the personal pets of Kim Il Sung, moved there upon his death. From 2000 until their deaths in 2013, the two Jindo dogs given by Kim Dae-Jung lived at the zoo with their puppies. A 2016 report mentioned schnauzers, St. Bernards, German shepherds, and a chihuahua as among the canine residents. Visitors can feed the dogs crackers.

According to a report by The Daily Telegraph, the zoo also had a parrot that can squawk "Long live the Great Leader, Comrade Kim Il Sung" in English. The zoo also houses a cigarette-smoking chimpanzee named Azalea, basketball-playing monkeys, doves that are part of a figure skating routine, and a dog who is trained to manipulate an abacus.

== Reception ==
International reception to the zoo has been largely negative. Glyn Ford described it as a "depressing" place where the animals live "in joyless captivity." The Lonely Planet travel guide for Korea described it as a "depressing and uninspiring place, best avoided".

Outside of North Korea, various rumors surrounding the zoo have arisen. Travis Jeppesen wrote that during the reign of Kim Il Sung, "tales abounded of half-starved beasts howling in minuscule cages," and that a popular legend claimed the animals were fed meat from executed prisoners. In 2025, when Pyongyang was briefly reopened to foreign tourists, there were claims that the zoo experience was "staged" and that many of the visitors were actors; these claims are said to have been "misinformation."

== Controversy ==
A zebra at the zoo in 2018. The zoo has been criticized for its treatment of animals.

The Central Zoo has been criticized for its treatment of animals. A 2006 report in the Asia Times described a North Korean movie entitled Fighting Animals, purporting to be a nature documentary, showing caged animals, often of different species, fighting each other to the death. The report noted that many of the animal species portrayed, which included endangered species, were only kept at the Central Zoo and nowhere else in North Korea; on this basis, they accused zookeepers there of being complicit in the production of the film, including placing animals of different species into the same cage and goading them to attack each other.

International animal rights activists and groups have criticized the zoo. In 2004, Jane Goodall visited the zoo to see the chimpanzee exhibit. Allegedly, a zookeeper presented two chimps so emaciated they looked like "scarecrows", and had them do tricks, such as riding a bike, which they were almost too weak to do. Goodall was reportedly brought to tears by the sight. In 2010, after Robert Mugabe announced his sending of animals to the zoo, the Born Free Foundation said that there was "no conservation benefit to these plans" and that the decision posed "a substantial threat to the welfare of the individual animals involved."

The zoo participates in the breeding of endangered species as part of species recovery. However, it is known to allow inbreeding to occur, such as in the case of its Amur leopards. This has led to leopards being born without tails, cryptorchidism, and other birth defects. There is also a lack of proper records with the leopards; while the International Studbook Keeper for Rare Leopards claims that the zoo's Amur leopard population were "all wild born and unrelated to each other," this is inconsistent with other accounts.
