= Al Rawdah (Riyadh) =

Al-Rawdah حي الروضة
- Neighbourhood
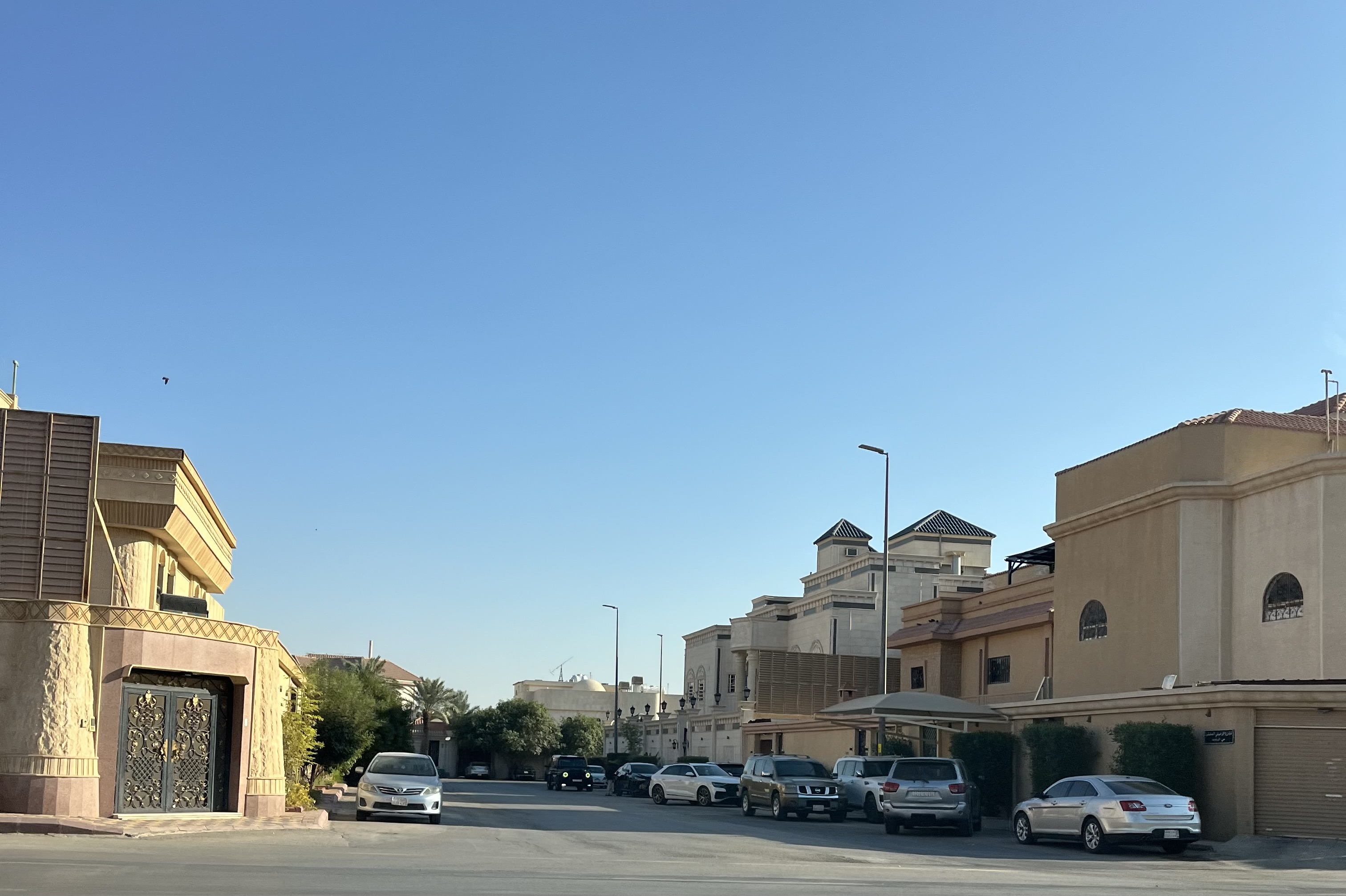
- Al Rawdah, 2024
- Interactive map of Al-Rawdah
- Coordinates: 24°44′5″N 46°46′4″E
- Country: Saudi Arabia
- City: Riyadh

Government
  - Body: Al Rawdah Sub-Municipality

Language
  - Official: Arabic

Al-Rawdah (Arabic: الروضة, lit. 'the meadow') is a residential neighborhood in eastern Riyadh, Saudi Arabia, and the seat of the homonymous sub-municipality of al-Rawdah. located east of King Abdullah District and south of al-Quds. The district emerged in the 1970s and is named after the singular form of the Arabic word Riyadh.

The neighborhood is situated north of al-Rayyan, east of King Abdullah District, south of al-Quds and west of al-Andalus. It covers an area of 8.71 square kilometer. Al Rawdah park is a famous landmark here in Al-Rawdah. International Indian School, Riyadh is one of the largest schools in Riyadh. The school works under the Indian Embassy and Is Affiliated with CBSE.

Al-Rawdah is an ideal place for living. Properties and rented villas and apartments are also available. Many foreigners and expats live here.
