= Mangyongdae-guyok =

District of Pyongyang

Man'gyŏngdae-guyŏk 만경대구역
- Guyŏk of Pyongyang

Korean transcription(s)
  - Hanja: 萬景台區域
  - McCune-Reischauer: Man'gyŏngdae-guyŏk
  - Revised Romanization: Mangyeongdae-guyeok
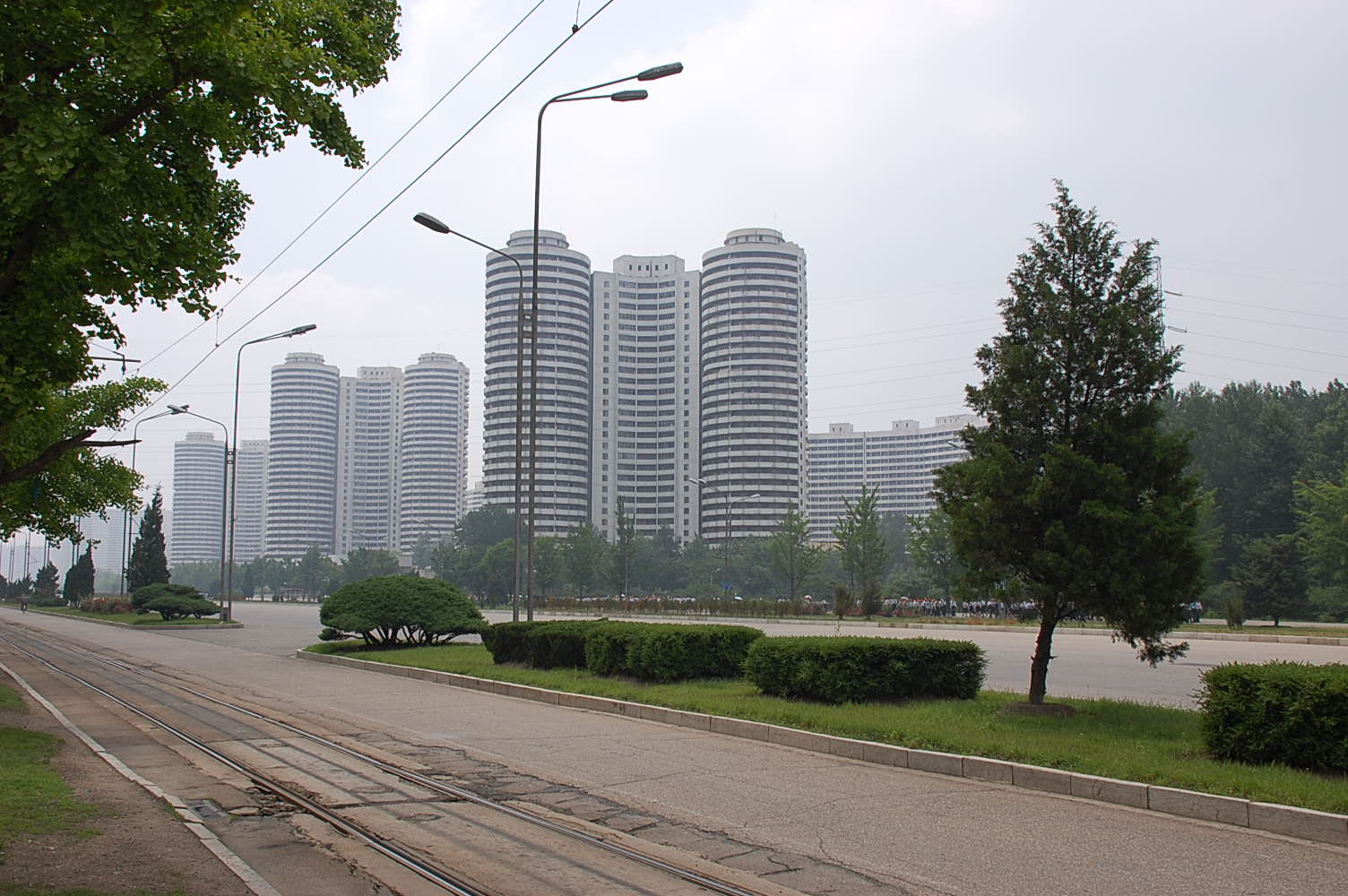
- Kwangbok Street in Mangyongdae-guyok

- Location of Mangyongdae-guyok within Pyongyang
- Coordinates: 39°01′20″N 125°38′40″E
- Country: North Korea
- Direct-administered city: P'yŏngyang-Chikhalsi

Area
  - Total: 89.9 km^{2} (34.7 sq mi)

Population (2008)
  - Total: 321,690
  - Density: 3,580/km^{2} (9,270/sq mi)

- Mangyongdae-guyok
- Chosŏn'gŭl: 만경대구역
- Hancha: 萬景台區域
- Revised Romanization: Mangyeongdaeguyeok
- McCune–Reischauer: Man'gyŏngdae-guyŏk

Man'gyŏngdae-guyŏk or Man'gyŏngdae District (Korean: 만경대구역) is one of the 19 guyok which constitute the city of Pyongyang, North Korea. It began as a village called Man'gyŏngdae-ri in South P'yŏngan Province before becoming a district of P'yŏngyang in September 1959. The area is surrounded by several hills, the highest one named Man'gyŏng Hill (Korean for 'Ten thousand views hill') because one can enjoy a bird's-eye view of the surrounding scenic landscape, and the village at its foot is called Man'gyŏngdae. Man'gyŏngdae was the birthplace of North Korean leader Kim Il Sung.

Man'gyŏngdae-guyŏk extends to the west past the Sunhwa River, to Kangso-gun. Kwangbok Street is a residential district of high rise apartments populated by members of the DPRK media and cultural institutions.

== Administrative divisions ==
Man'gyŏngdae-guyŏk is divided into 26 tong (neighbourhoods) and 2 ri (villages):

- Changhun 1-dong (Korean: 장훈 1동; Hanja: 獎訓 1洞)
- Changhun 2-dong (장훈 2동; 獎訓 2洞)
- Changhun 3-dong (장훈 3동; 獎訓 3洞)
- Ch'ilgol 1-dong (칠골 1동)
- Ch'ilgol 2-dong (칠골 2동)
- Ch'ilgol 3-dong (칠골 3동)
- Ch'ukchŏn 1-dong (축전 1동 (祝典 1洞)
- Ch'ukchŏn 2-dong (축전 2동 (祝典 2洞)
- Kallimgil 1-dong (갈림길 1동)
- Kallimgil 2-dong (갈림길 2동)
- Kŏn'guk-dong (건국동; 建國洞)
- Kŭmch'ŏn-dong (금천동; 金泉洞)
- Kŭmsŏng 1-dong (금성 1동; 金星 1洞)
- Kŭmsŏng 2-dong (금성 2동; 金星 2洞)
- Kŭmsŏng 3-dong (금성 3동; 金星 3洞)
- Kwangbok-dong (광복동; 光復洞)
- Man'gyŏngdae-dong (만경대동; 萬景臺洞)
- P'algol 1-dong (팔골 1동)
- P'algol 2-dong (팔골 2동)
- Ryong'aksan-dong (룡악산동; 龍岳山洞)
- Ryongsan-dong (룡산동; 龍山洞)
- Samhŭng-dong (삼흥동; 三興洞)
- Sŏn'guja-dong (선구자동; 先驅者洞)
- Sŏnnae-dong (선내동; 仙內洞)
- Sŏsan-dong (서산동; 西山洞)
- Taep'yŏng-dong (대평동; 大平洞)
- Tangsan 1-dong (당상 1동; 堂上 1洞)
- Tangsan 2-dong (당상 2동; 堂上 2洞)
- Ryongbong-ri (룡봉리; 龍峰里)
- Wŏllo-ri (원로리; 元魯里)

== See also ==
- Mangyongdae – historic neighborhood in Man'gyŏngdae-guyŏk
- Mangyongdae Children's Palace
- Mangyongdae Funfair
- Mangyongdae Revolutionary School
