= List of amusement parks in North Korea =

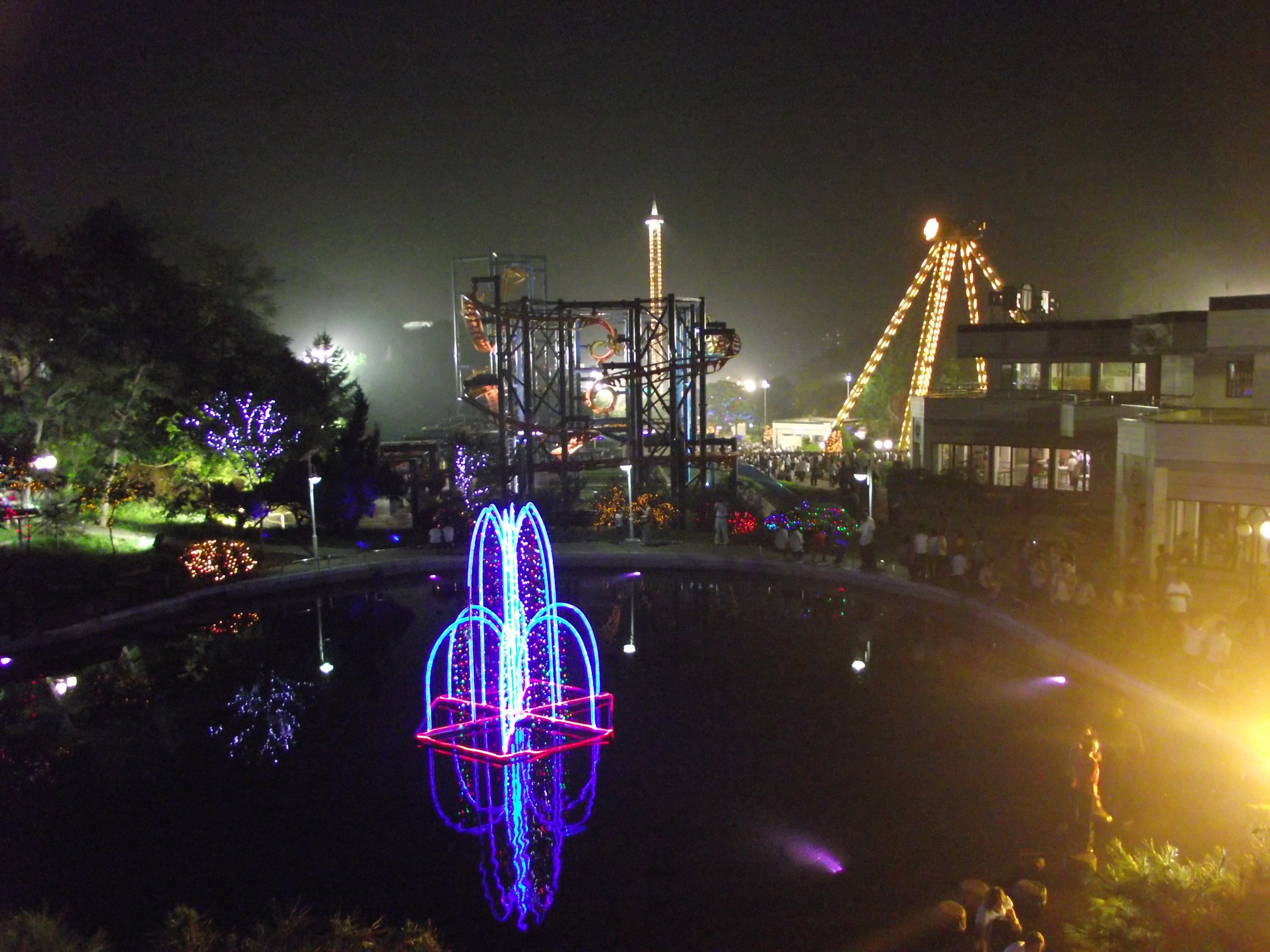
Kaeson Youth Park

This is a list of amusement parks in North Korea.

- Kaeson Youth Park
- Mangyongdae Funfair
- Munsu Water Park
- Pyongyang Folklore Park
- Rungna People's Pleasure Ground
- Taesongsan Funfair
- Myongsasimni Water Park in the Wonsan Kalma Coastal Tourist Area

== See also ==
- List of amusement parks in Asia
