= Munsu Funfair =

Amusement park in Pyongyang, North Korea

- Interactive map of Munsu Funfair
- Location: North Korea
- Coordinates: 39°2′24.80″N 125°46′54.23″E
- Opened: 1984
- Operating season: Year-round

The Munsu Funfair (Korean: 문수유희장) was an amusement park located in Pyongyang, North Korea. Opened in 1984, the park was located near the Chongryu Bridge, and was across the Taedong River from the Rungnado May Day Stadium. It was renovated and renamed into Munsu Water Park in 2013.

== See also ==
- List of amusement parks in North Korea
