= Al Hamra (Riyadh) =

- District
- Location in Saudi Arabia
- Coordinates: 24°46′37.065″N 46°45′9.667″E
- Country: Saudi Arabia
- Province: Al Riyadh Province

Government
  - Body: Baladiyah Al Rawdah
- Time zone: UTC+3 (EAT)
  - Summer (DST): UTC+3 (EAT)

Al Hamra'a (aka Al Hamra; Arabic: الحمراء) is a subject of Baladiyah al-Rawdah and a neighborhood in Riyadh, Saudi Arabia.

Located in the northeastern part of the city, Al Hamra'a hosts a number of sites and local landmarks, such as Al Hamra'a Park, Al Hokair Land, Star City Park, Al Marsa Resorts, Riyadh Najed Schools, Sanad Hospital, Jarir Bookstore, The Water Splash, etc.

== Landmarks ==
The following are landmarks in Al Hamra'a:

- Al Hamra Park
- Al Hokair Land
- Star City Park
- Al Marsa Resorts
- The Water Splash
- Riyadh Najed Schools
- Sanad Hospital
- El Seif Engineering
- Jarir Bookstore
