= Al Rawdah Sub-Municipality =

Baladiyah Al-Rawdah بلدية الروضة
- Baladiyah
- Country: Saudi Arabia
- City: Riyadh

Government
  - Body: Riyadh Municipality
- Website: rawda.alriyadh.gov.sa

Al-Rawdah Sub-Municipality (Arabic: بلدية الروضة) is one of the 16 baladiyahs of Riyadh, Saudi Arabia, which includes 17 neighborhoods and districts, including al-Rawdah, and is responsible for their maintenance, planning and development.

== Neighborhoods and districts ==
- Al Rawdah
- Al Andalus
- King Faisal District
- Al-Quds
- Al Hamra
- Ash-Shuhada
- Ghirnatah
- Al-Qurtubah
- Al-Munsiyah
- Al-Yarmuk
- Ishbiliyah
- Al-Khaleej
- Al-Nahadhah
- Al-Maizilah
- Al-Qadisiyyah
- Al-Rimal
- Sedra
