= Azalea (chimpanzee) =

North Korean smoking chimpanzee

- Born: 1996 (age 29–30)
- Other name: Dallae
- Occupation: Korea Central Zoo performer
- Known for: Smoking cigarettes

Azalea (known in Korean as Dallae) is a chimpanzee housed at the Korea Central Zoo in Pyongyang, North Korea. She is best known for her ability to smoke cigarettes, a behavior that has garnered criticism from multiple animal rights organizations.

== Smoking ==
Azalea smokes about one pack of cigarettes a day, though she reportedly does not inhale when smoking. She is able to light her own cigarettes using a lighter and has also learned to light a cigarette by touching it to the end of a lit cigarette. Azalea's trainers support her smoking, providing her with both supplies and encouragement. Azalea is popular with the zoo's visitors, many of whom find her funny.

Azalea is also able to perform tricks like dancing, bowing, and touching her nose.

== Criticism ==
The Zoo has been criticized by PETA President Ingrid Newkirk, who stated that it was "cruel to willfully addict a chimpanzee to tobacco for human amusement" and that smoking was as dangerous to Azalea as it is to humans.

The Animal Legal Defense Fund's Director of Litigation has described the keeping and treatment of Azalea as part of a larger problem with displaying captive wildlife for profit, stating that "they are made to do unnatural and freakish things to attract gawkers".

Azalea is not the only animal at the zoo known for "less-than-ethical" habits, with other exhibits including a dog that can manipulate an abacus, basketball-playing monkeys, and a group of doves that perform a figure-skating routine.

== See also ==
- Smoking in North Korea
- List of individual apes
