= Snow Kingdom =

Theme park in Maharashtra, India

- Location: Chennai
- Coordinates: 12.9133°N 80.2513°E

Snow Kingdom is India's largest snow theme park. It occupies 14,000 sq ft (1,300 m^{2}) in Chennai, Tamil Nadu and Mumbai, Maharashtra.

The park provides sterilised, cold weather clothing to allow visitors to cope with the sub-zero temperature inside. The snow is made by reverse osmosis of water. The prevailing temperature inside the theme park is −8 °C (18 °F). Inside the theme park, there are replicas of seals, penguins, and snow deer.

Other attractions include a Click Art Museum, which hosts 23 incomplete 3D art paintings that wait to become complete as visitors enter the frame, and a Live Art Museum, which consists of models of celebrities from around the world.

Snow Kingdom
- Location: Mumbai
- Coordinates: 19.1000°N 72.9160°E
