= Bali Zoo =

Zoo in Indonesia

Coordinates: 8°35′26″S 115°15′56″E

- Logo

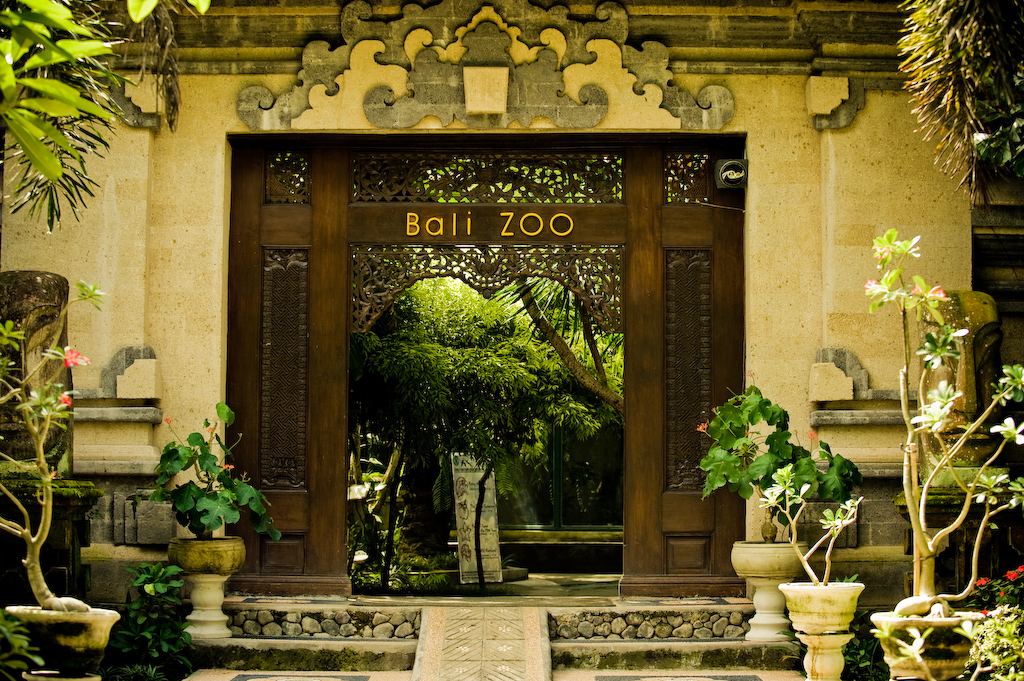
- The opening gates of Bali Zoo in 2008
- Interactive map of Bali Zoo
- Date opened: 2002
- Location: Jl. Raya Singapadu, Singapadu, Kec. Sukawati, Gianyar Regency, Bali, Indonesia 80582
- No. of animals: 600+
- No. of species: 60
- Annual visitors: 20,000 (2012)
- Website: www.bali-zoo.com

Bali Zoo is a zoo located in Gianyar Regency, Bali, Indonesia. It was the first zoo to open in Bali and the primary zoo of the island. The zoo has over 600 animals from 60 species.

== History ==
Bali Zoo was founded in 2002 by Anak Agung Gde Putra. He was the manager of the zoo from its founding until 2011, when his son Lesmana Putra became manager. In February 2024, the zoo received an average of 800 to 1,000 visitors daily on weekdays, and up to 2,000 visitors on holidays such as Isra Mikraj and Imlek (Chinese New Year). An estimated 70% of the visitors were domestic, while 30% were foreign.

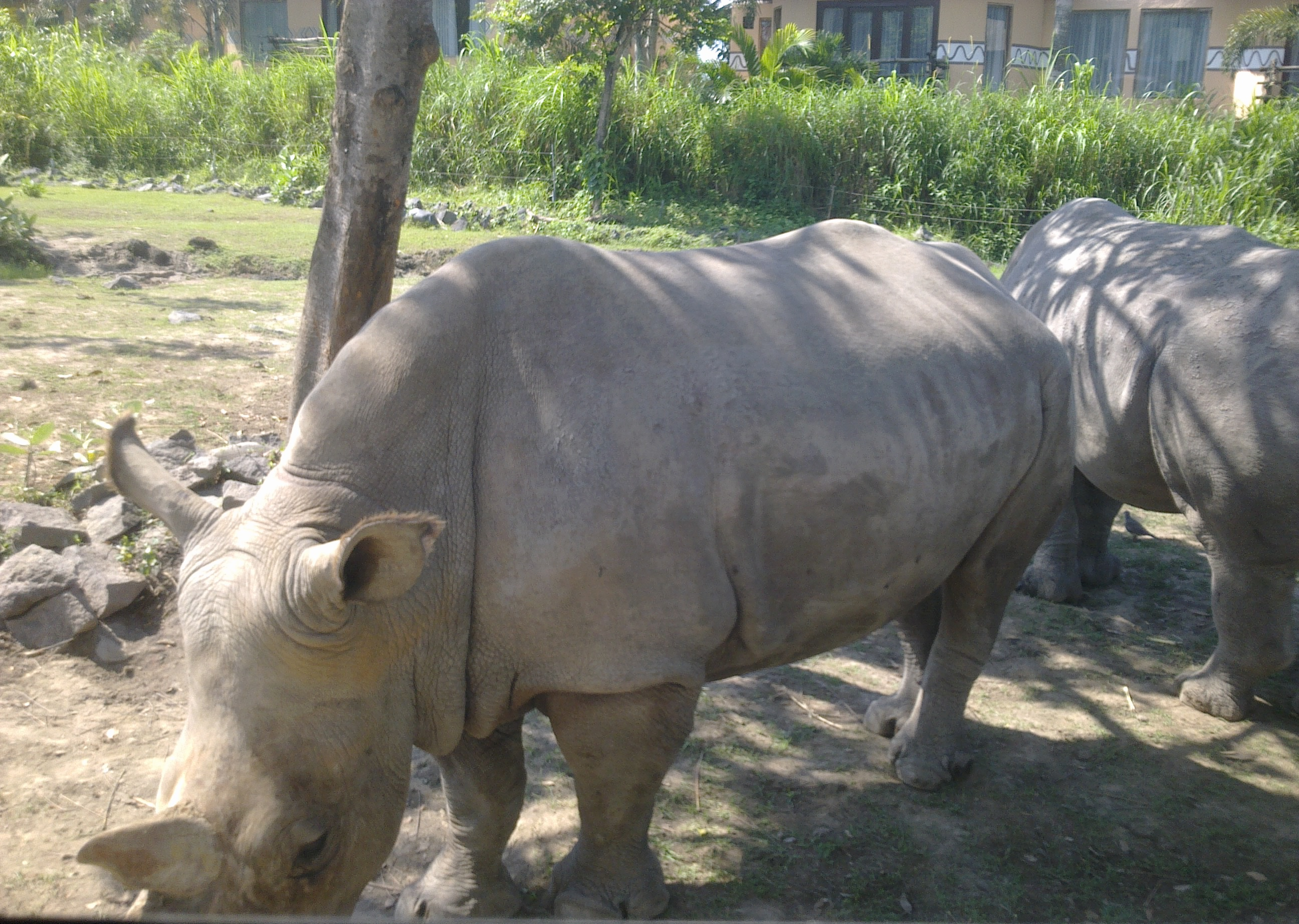
A Southern white rhinoceros at Bali Zoo

In December 2024, a 45-year-old female Sumatran elephant of the zoo named Molly died after being swept away by a strong river current.

The seventh president of Indonesia Joko Widodo and his family visited the zoo in April 2025.

== Controversy ==
In 2018, World Animal Protection reviewed the zoos of Bali and concluded that Bali Zoo engaged in abusive practices towards animals, such as elephant riding and allowing visitors to touch the animals. The organization made another report on Bali zoos in 2023, and found that Bali Zoo had not stopped abusive practices.
