= Amaazia =

Water park in Surat, Gujarat, India

Aqua Imagicaa Water Park
- Previously known as Amaazia Water Park
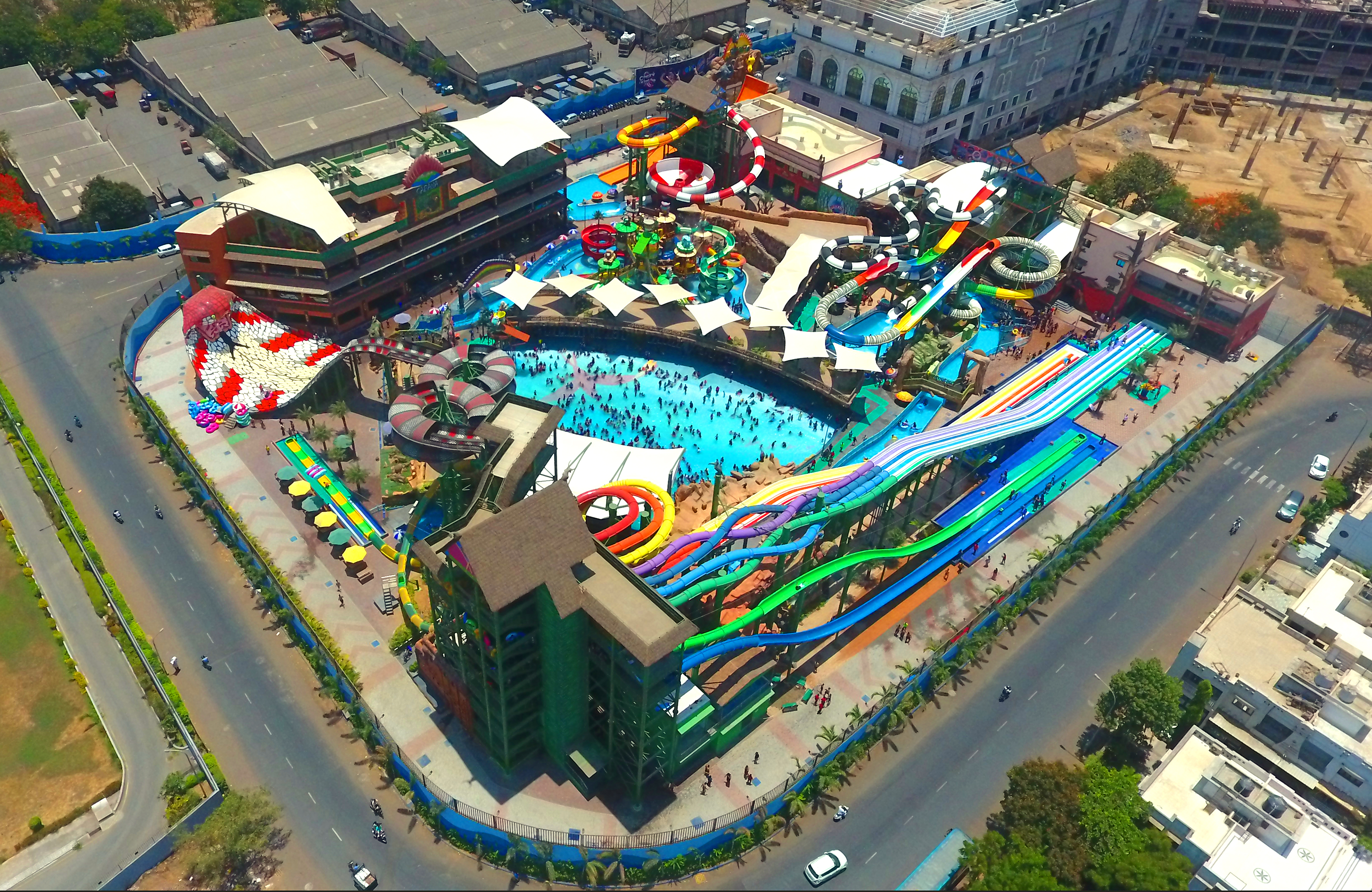
- Aerial View of Imagicaa Amaazia Water Park in 2017 Aerial View
- Interactive map of Aqua Imagicaa Water Park
- Location: Surat, Gujarat, India
- Coordinates: 21.1135°N 72.5152°E
- Opened: 15 December 2016 by Vijay Rupani
- Owner: Imagica World Entertainment Ltd.
- Area: 4 acres (1.6 ha)

Attractions
- Water rides: 16
- Website: www.aquaimagicaa.com

Aqua Imagicaa Waterpark, formerly known as Amaazia Water Park, is an amusement water park in Surat, Gujarat, India. Aquamagicaa opened to the public on 15 December 2016, inaugurated by the then Chief Minister of Gujarat, Vijay Rupani. It is built by the Rajgreen Group of Companies. But in February 2023, Rajgreen Group of Companies sold the waterpark to Imagica World Entertainment Ltd.

== Rides and pools ==
There are three types of rides available "Thrill", "Fun" and "Kids".

=== Thrill ===
- King Kobra
- Twister
- Forest Jump
- Kamikaze

=== Fun ===
- Tribal Twist
- Windigo
- Wild Raft
- Jungle Boat
- Free Fall
- Black Hole
- The Carnival Beach
- Sky Slider

=== Kids ===
- Pond of Life

== Theme Song ==
The Amaazia theme song is Crazy Kiya Re's actor, lyrics, music and sung by Indian rapper Badshah and directed by Anthony D'Souza film Boss fame. The Surat Municipal Corporation, with the approval of the State Government, has allocated land for this project.

== Services ==
- Free parking for two wheelers and four wheelers
- ATM
- Shopping
- Lost and Found items
- Wheel chair
- Cloak Room
- Disabled visitors
- Restaurant
- Charge your cell phone
- First aid
- Lockers

== See also ==
- Article on Amaazia in The Economic Times
- Article on Amaazia in The Economic Times
- Article on Amaazia in The Financial Express (India)
- Article on Amaazia in Business Standard, India
- Article on Amaazia in Indiatoday
