= World Chocolate Wonderland =

Theme park in China

World Chocolate Wonderland (simplified Chinese: 世界巧克力梦公园; traditional Chinese: 世界巧克力夢公園; pinyin: Shìjiè Qiǎokèlì Mènggōngyuán, literally, "World Chocolate Dream Park") is the first chocolate theme park in China. Located in Beijing to the north of the Bird's Nest, its grand opening was on January 29, 2010. It houses the world's biggest chocolate model of the Great Wall of China.

On January 29, 2010, the World Chocolate Wonderland opened to the general public with a fashion show. Models adorned with wigs and dresses made of chocolate strode down the runway. One model wore a dragon costume composed of chocolate gold coins.

The theme park's purpose is to "bring a little sweetness" to the Chinese people during the recession. Furthermore, it was designed to allow visitors to learn about chocolate's history and its impact on other cultures. Because of the impending warm weather that would melt the chocolate, World Chocolate Wonderland closes in April of each year and reopens in January of the next year.

== Attractions ==
The theme park is 215,000 square feet (20,000 m^{2}) long and contains exhibitions that are fabricated from 176,000 pounds of chocolate. There are three exhibition halls which are temperature-controlled so that the chocolate exhibits, which are enclosed by large glass panes, will not melt.

The park showcases the world's biggest chocolate model of the Great Wall of China. The Great Wall replication is 12 metres (39 ft) long. The admission fee is 80 yuan (12 dollars) per ticket.

World Chocolate Wonderland contains a replica of the famous Terracotta Army. The exhibit comprises 500 life-size figures made from chocolate. It exhibits chocolate shoes and clothes, as well as a BMW car that is made from 2 tons of chocolate. The car required ten craftsmen and six months to build.
