= Al Hokair Land =

Amusement park in Riyadh, Saudi Arabia

Al Hokair Land الحكير لاند
- Interactive map of Al Hokair Land الحكير لاند
- Location: Eastern Ring Road, al-Hamra, Riyadh, Saudi Arabia
- Coordinates: 24°45′54.6″N 46°44′14.1″E
- Status: Defunct
- Opened: July 2002
- Closed: April 2021
- Owner: Al Hokair Group

Al Hokair Land (Arabic: الحكير لاند, romanized: al-Ḥukayr Lānd) was an amusement park in al-Hamra neighborhood of Riyadh, Saudi Arabia. Founded in 2002, it was considered as one of the most popular recreational spots of the city. It was closed in April 2021.

== History ==
The amusement park opened in 2002. In late April 2021, popular entertainment magazine Screen Mix reported the beginning of the amusement park's demolition through its Twitter handle.

Screen Mix
(@ScreenMix)
tweeted:

Arabic:

بدء أعمال هدم ملاهي الحكير لاند بالرياض، والتي شكلت جزءًا كبيرًا من ذاكرة أهل الرياض على مدى قرابة 20 عامًا.

Translation:

The start of the demolition of Al Hokair Land amusement park in Riyadh, which formed a large part of the memory of the people of Riyadh for nearly 20 years.

April 27, 2021

== See also ==
- Tourism in Saudi Arabia
