= Dan Neramit =

Amusement park in Thailand

Coordinates: 13°49′13″N 100°33′53″E

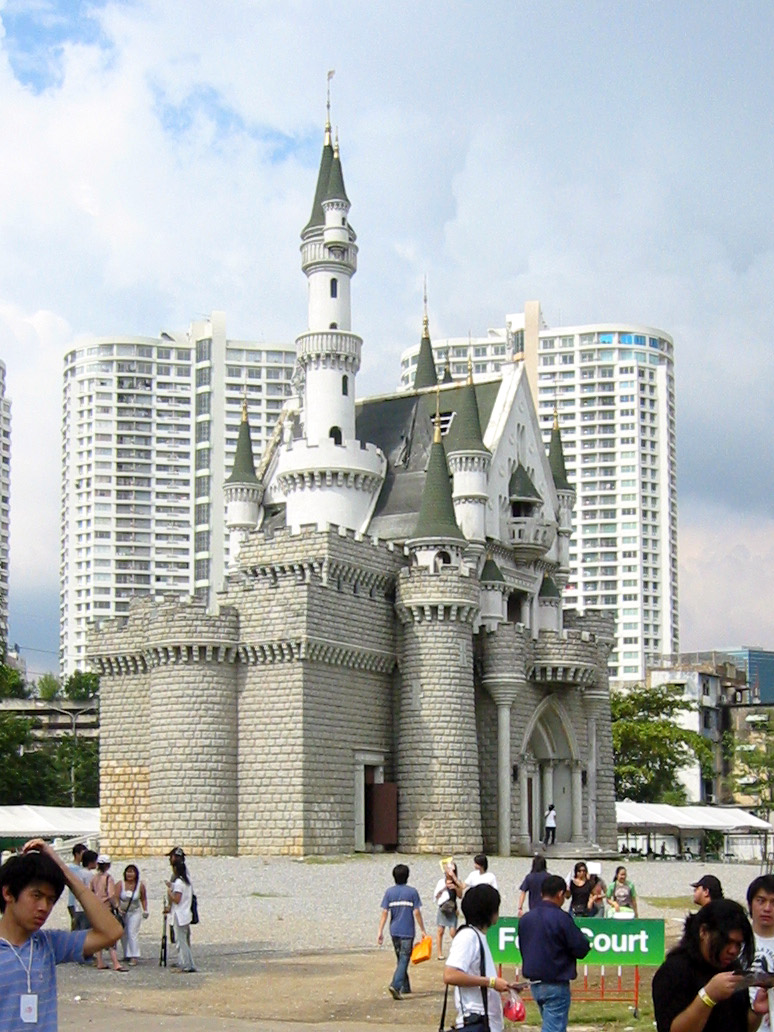
The fairy-tale castle in 2005

Dan Neramit (Thai: แดนเนรมิต, RTGS: Daen Neramit, pronounced [dɛ̄ːn nēː.rā.mít]), sometimes translated as Magic Land, was the first amusement park in Thailand. It occupied 33 rai (5.3 ha; 13 acres) of land on Phahonyothin Road in Bangkok's Chatuchak District, and was in operation from 1976 to 2000, when its lease expired and owner Pannin Kitiparaporn moved operations to her new main property Dream World in the northern suburb of Pathum Thani Province.

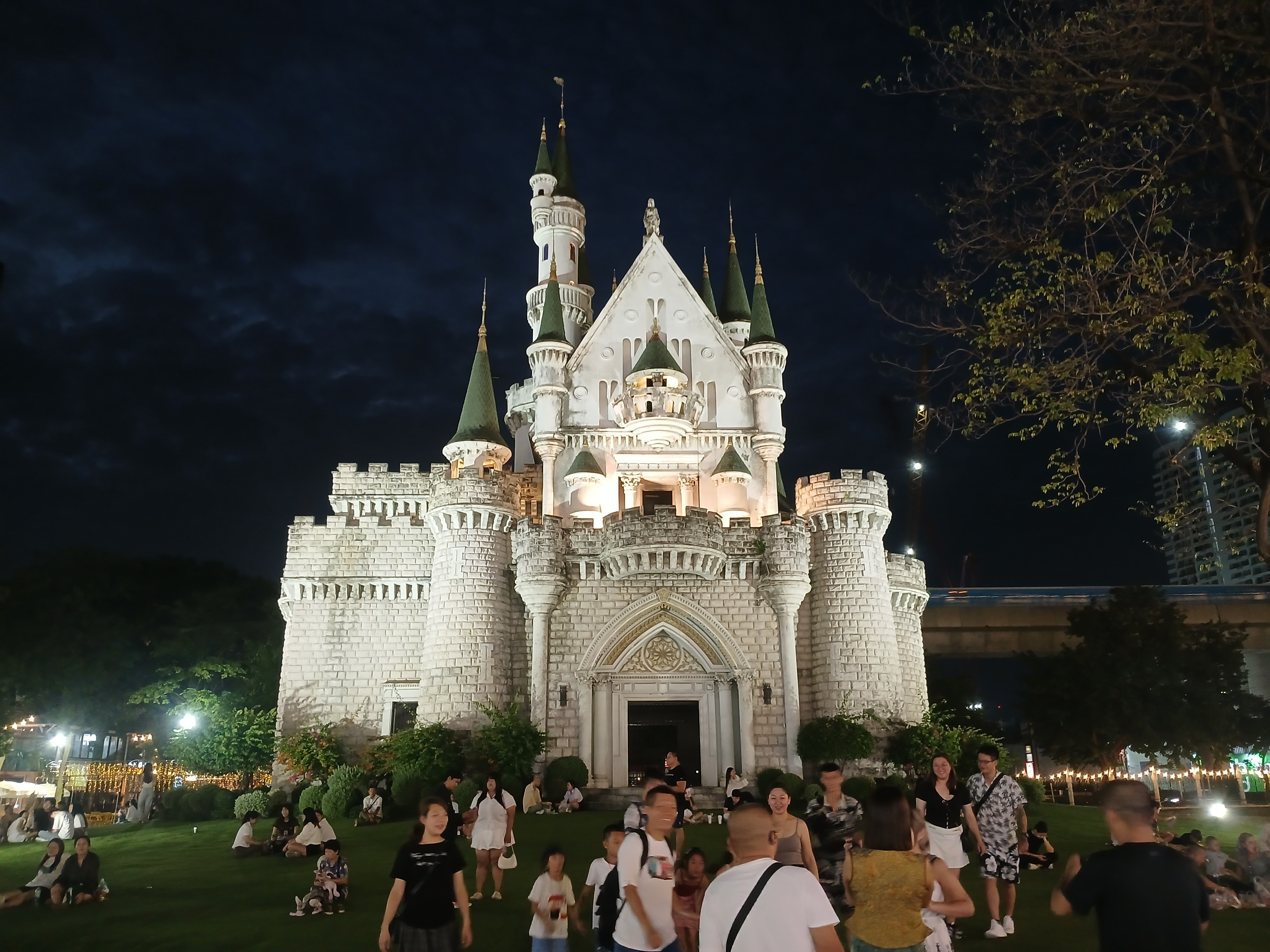
Night Market in 2025

One of the park's most distinctive features was its fairy-tale castle, which overlooked its relatively small plot of land, and still stands today. In 2023, the park's grounds became the site of Jodd Fairs DanNeramit Night Market, whose name was later changed to Train Night Market DanNeramit as part of the Train Night Market chain. The market closed down in 2025, and re-opened that year as Liabduan Danneramit Night Market.
