= Agartala Amusement Park =

Former amusement park in Tripura, India

Agartala Amusement Park was the largest entertainment park in North East India at Amtuli, Agartala, Tripura. As of 2022, the park is closed due to operational reasons.
