= Taman Pintar Yogyakarta =

Science museum in Yogyakarta, Indonesia

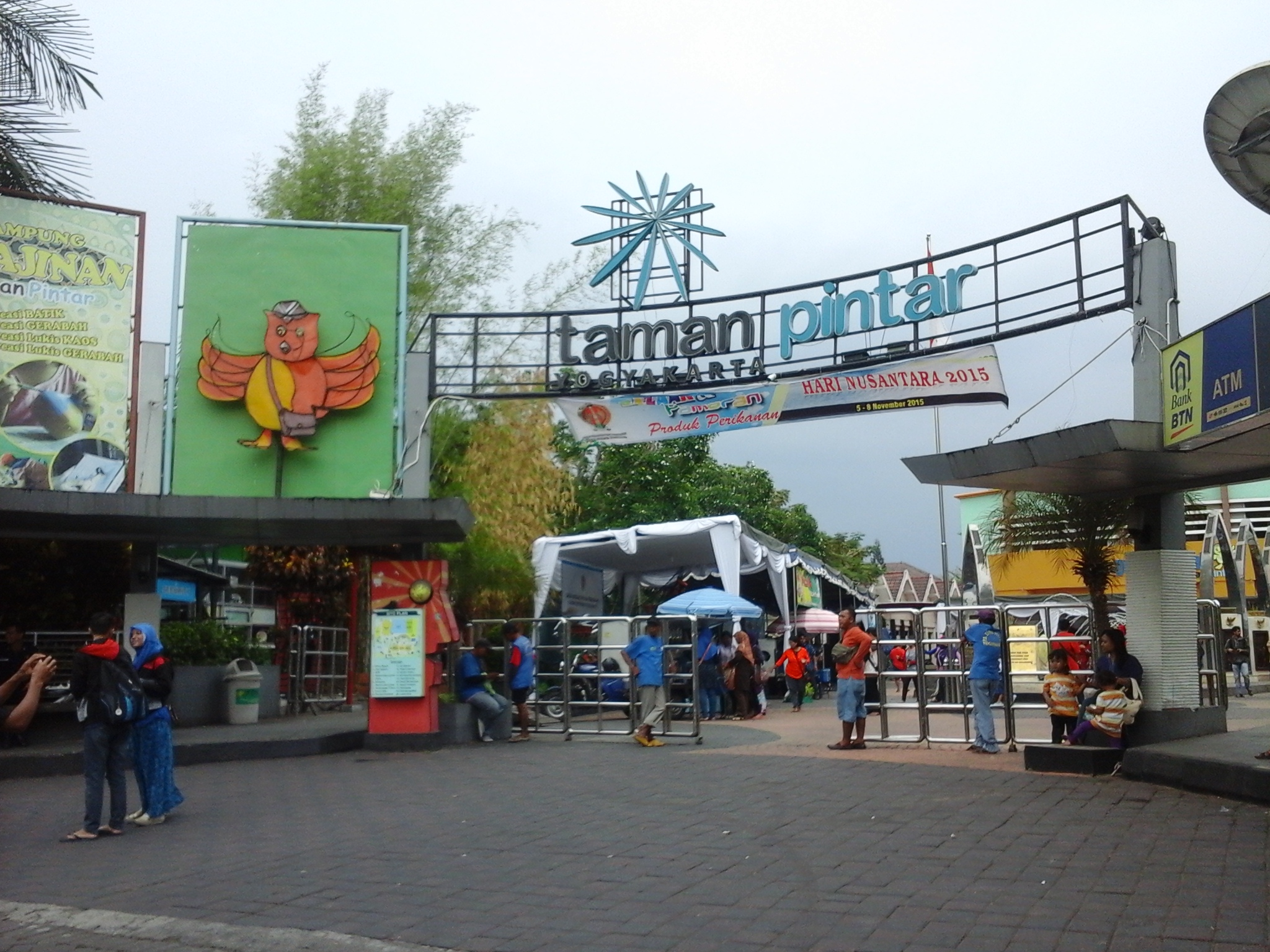
- Taman Pintar entrance in 2015
- Interactive map of Taman Pintar Yogyakarta
- Location: Yogyakarta, Special Region of Yogyakarta, Indonesia
- Coordinates: 7°48′2″S 110°22′3″E
- Opened: 16 December 2008
- Owner: Yogyakarta City government
- Theme: Recreation and Education Park
- Slogan: Mencerdaskan dan Menyenangkan dengan pendekatan Niteni, Niroake, Nambahi (Educate and Please with the approach of "Niteni", "Niroake", "Nambahi")

Attractions
- Total: 5
- Website: http://tamanpintar.com/

Taman Pintar Yogyakarta (Javanese: ꦠꦩꦤ꧀ꦥꦶꦤ꧀ꦠꦂꦔꦪꦺꦴꦒꦾꦏꦂꦠ, romanized: Taman Pintar Ngayogyakarta, lit. 'Yogyakarta Smart Park'), or just Taman Pintar, is a science-themed park and museum for kids and a place for expression, appreciation, creation in a pleasant situation. It is situated on the center of the city of Yogyakarta, on Jalan Panembahan Senopati.

Bringing its motto educate and pleasant, the place that was firstly built in 2004 wants to increase the intention of kids and the young generation in science through imaginations, trials, and games in order to improve the human resources.

Taman Pintar also concerns in implement Ki Hajar Dewantara's lessons of Niteni (to understand), Niroake (to follow), and Nambahi (to improve).

== Zone ==
- Playground

A place to welcome and play and also a public place for the visitors. Here, there are places for children to play such as Talking Pipe, Whispering Parabola, Tree House, Dancing Water, Water Corridor, Pulley System, Moving Bridge, Sand Palace, etc.

- Heritage Building

This area are intended for the kids pre-school and.

- Oval Building:

This area consists of the zone of environmental introduction and science exhibition, history, science and technology.

- Square Building:

It consists of three floors. The first is exhibition room, audio visual room, food court, and souvenir counter. The second floor is elementary material and implementing science, and library. The third floor is science laboratory, animation and TV, and courses class.

- Planetarium

== Open Hour ==
Everyday from Tuesday to Sunday at 09.00 - 16.00 PM (Monday closed)

== Facility ==
- Interactive science materials
- Exhibition Room and audiovisual room
- Food court
- Small Mosque
- Souvenir shop
- Information center
