= Sky Ranch =

Chain of amusement parks in the Philippines

- Location: 3 locations Tagaytay; San Fernando, Pampanga; Baguio
- Status: Operating
- Opened: March 2, 2013; 13 years ago (First amusement park)
- Owner: SM Prime Holdings
- Operating season: Year-round
- Website: www.skyranch.ph

Sky Ranch
- Coordinates: 14.095305°N 120.937613°E
- Status: Operating

Sky Ranch Pampanga
- Coordinates: 15.054025°N 120.697057°E
- Status: Operating

Sky Ranch Baguio
- Coordinates: 16.406623°N 120.600007°E
- Status: Operating

Sky Ranch (also stylized as Skyranch) is a network of amusement parks in the Philippines. Sky Ranch has three branches: in Tagaytay; San Fernando, Pampanga; and in Baguio. The first Sky Ranch amusement park opened in Tagaytay in 2013.

== Branches ==
=== Tagaytay ===
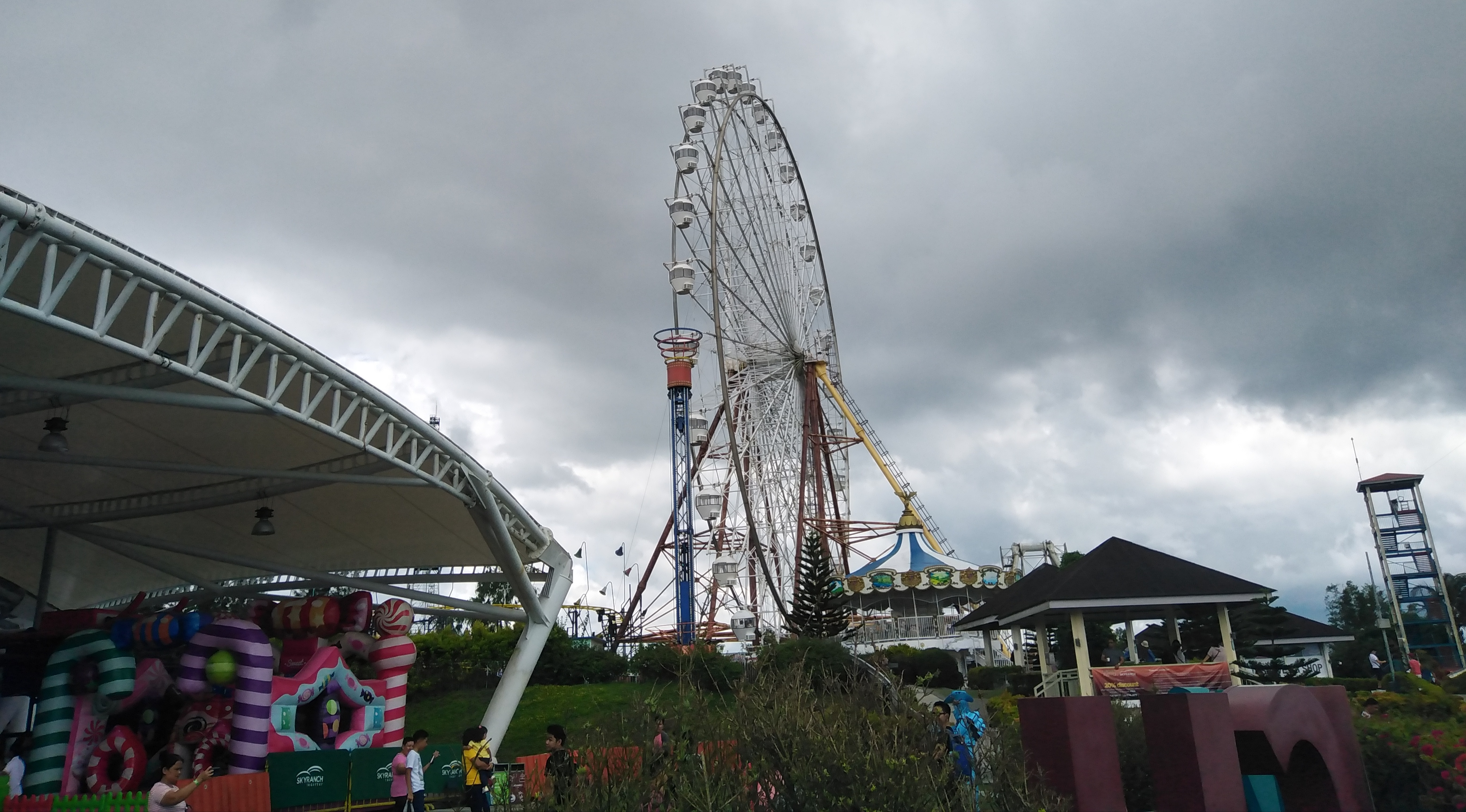
Sky Ranch Tagaytay

The Sky Ranch branch in Tagaytay is situated along Tagaytay–Nasugbu Highway, Tagaytay, Cavite which opened on March 2, 2013. It is located inside a property owned by SM Investments Corporation's subsidiary SM Land commercial property division (later merged with SM Prime Holdings, Inc), where several shops and restaurants are also located. It includes kiosks, rides, and the Sky Eye Ferris wheel, which is 63 meters (207 ft) tall and has 32 gondolas. The amusement park temporarily closed following ash fall caused by the Taal Volcano eruption on January 12, 2020 but reopened almost a week later on January 18.

=== Pampanga ===
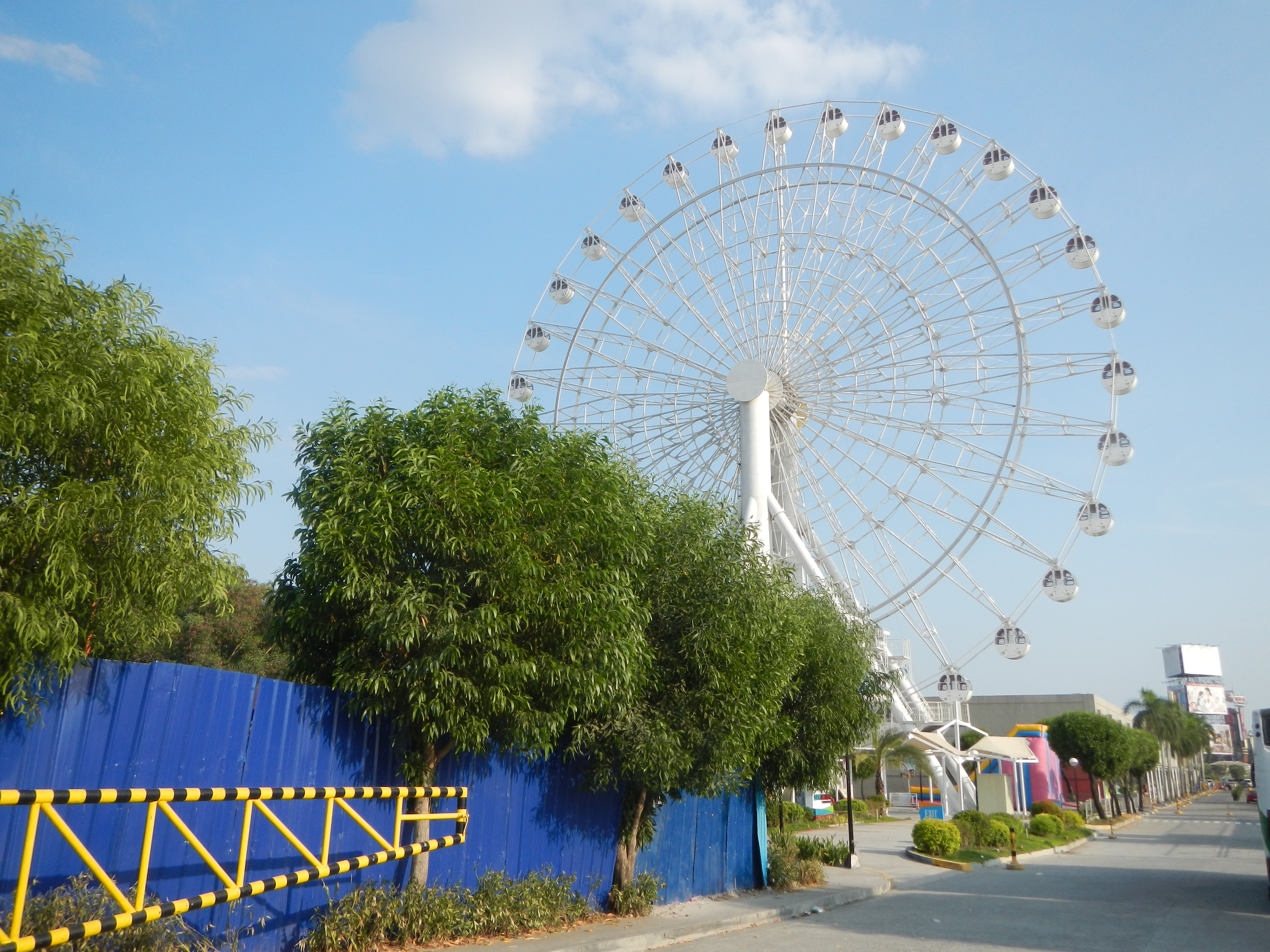
Sky Ranch Pampanga

The Sky Ranch branch in San Fernando, Pampanga is part of the SM City Pampanga shopping mall complex. It also hosts the Pampanga Eye, a 65-meter (213 ft) tall Ferris wheel.

=== Baguio ===
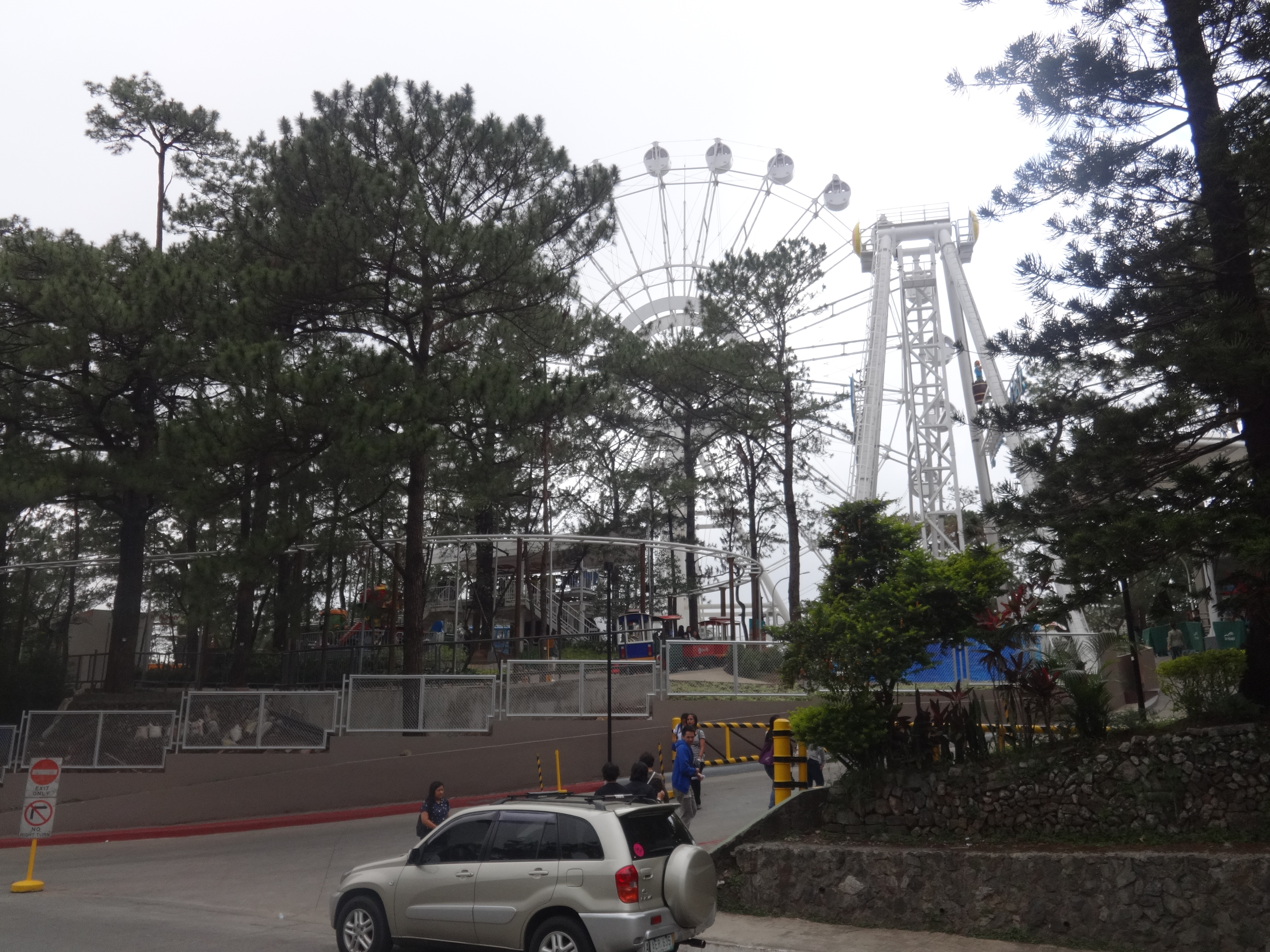
Sky Ranch Baguio

The Sky Ranch branch is located at Luneta Hill, Upper Session Road, Baguio, which opened in 2018. Its opening was met with opposition from surrounding universities which expressed concern on noise pollution generated by the park.

=== Summary ===
Locations of Sky Ranch branches

No.	Name	Opening Date	Location	Coordinates
1	Sky Ranch	March 2, 2013	Tagaytay	14.095305°N 120.937613°E
2	Sky Ranch Pampanga	November 30, 2014	SM City Pampanga, San Fernando, Pampanga	15.054025°N 120.697057°E
3	Sky Ranch Baguio	November 8, 2018	Baguio, Benguet	16.406623°N 120.600007°E
