= Pyongyang Folklore Park =

Park in Pyongyang, North Korea

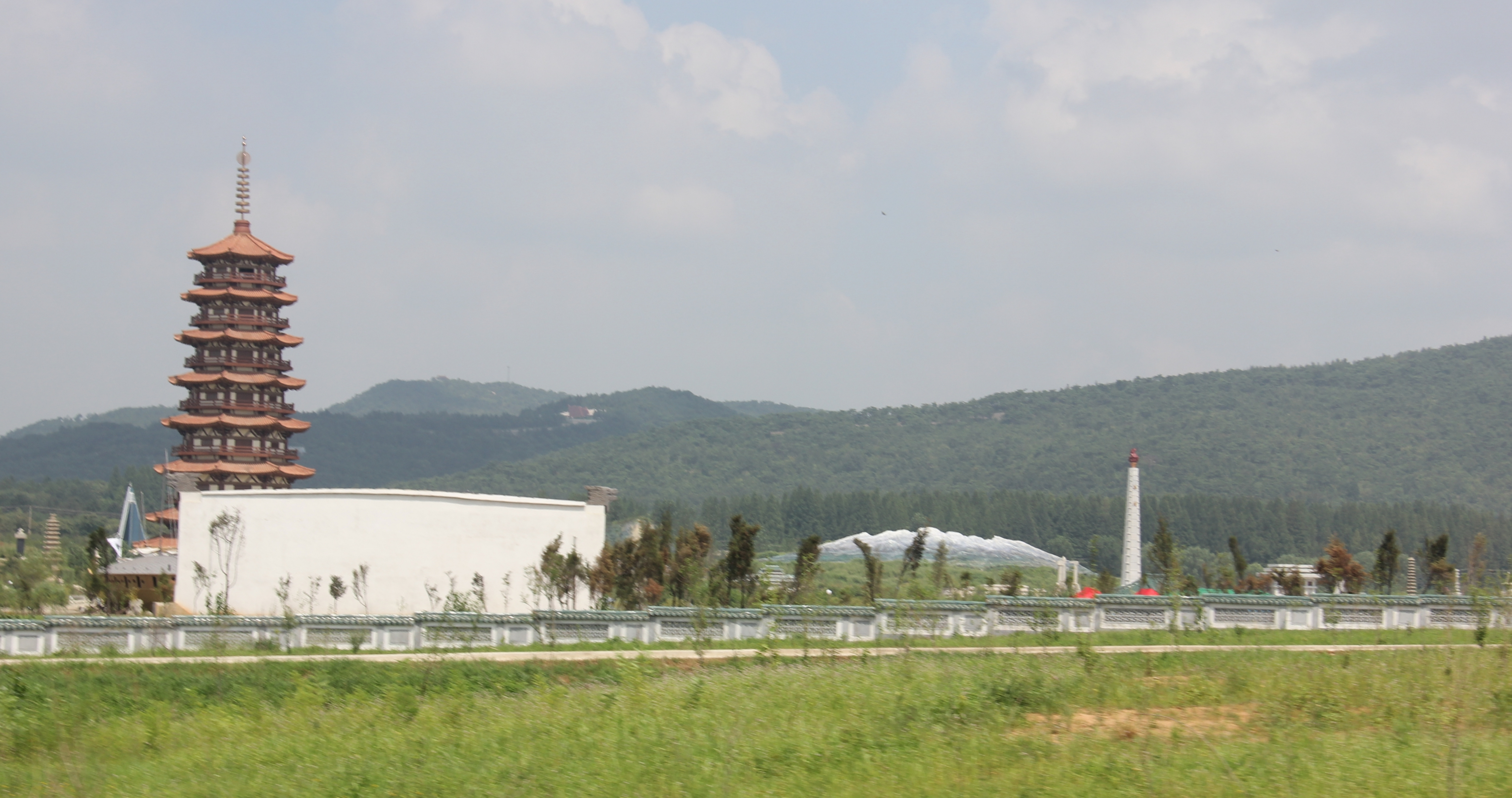
- Pyongyang Folklore Park in August 2012, shortly before opening
- Interactive map of Pyongyang Folklore Park
- Location: Pyongyang, North Korea
- Coordinates: 39°3′36″N 125°49′30″E
- Status: Defunct
- Opened: 11 September 2012
- Closed: June 2016
- Operating season: Year-round

The Pyongyang Folklore Park (Korean: 평양민속공원) was an amusement park located in Pyongyang, North Korea, at the foot of Mount Taesong. It was built with a historical theme, and construction began in December 2008. There are also folk parks in Sukchon, South Pyongan Province and Sariwon, North Hwanghae Province. South Korean folk parks with an historical theme such as Korean Folk Village are popular attractions. Tourists rarely visited the park. When tourists did visit, they were usually part of organized tours. The park was shut down for renovations in June 2016. News reports speculated that the facility reminded Kim Jong-un of his uncle, Jang Sung-taek, who managed the project before his execution in 2013. In 2016, satellite imagery showed that the park had been demolished.

== See also ==
- List of amusement parks in North Korea
