= Volga Manor =

Theme park in Harbin, China

Volga Manor 伏尔加庄园
- Location: Hacheng Road 16km, Xiangfang District, Harbin, China
- Status: Operating
- Opened: 2012
- Operating season: all year around
- Website: www.volgamanor.com

The Volga Manor (Chinese: 伏尔加庄园; pinyin: Fú'ěrjiā Zhuāngyuán) is a theme park in Harbin, a Chinese city in Heilongjiang Province with strong Russian influence. Named after the Volga River, one of the best known rivers in Russia, the park features Russian architecture, arts and cuisine. The aim of the park is to "reproduce Harbin's beauty of Russian classical architecture".

== Major sites ==
There are several sites in the park:

- St. Nicholas Church: built in 2007 as a reproduction of the former St. Nicholas Church in central Harbin that was destroyed in 1966.
- Petrov Art Palace: resembles the Petrov Art Palace in Moscow.
- Vodka Chateau: Built under reference to a chateau in St. Petersberg.
- Pushkin Salon: Built under reference to Red Square in Moscow.
