= Dash n Splash =

Water park in Chennai, India

- Interactive map of Dash n Splash
- Location: Chennai, Tamil Nadu, India
- Coordinates: 13.027691°N 80.010831°E
- Opened: 1995
- Closed: 2012
- Theme: Water park, aqua park
- Operating season: Year-round
- Area: 21 acres (85,000 m^{2})

Attractions
- Total: 10 (as of 2011)
- Water rides: 10

Dash N Splash was a water theme park located in Chennai, India. It was opened in 1995 and was the first exclusive water park in Chennai and South India. The idea of opening the water park was to get rid of the heat, sweat and dust of the city. The motto of the water park was "Refresh Yourself". Indian actor Suriya inaugurated this theme park. The park was shaded with coconut trees for refreshment and relaxation. Dash N Splash had a number of water reservoirs and slides for adults, kids & senior citizens. It was permanently closed down in 2012.

== About ==
Dash N Splash covered much of the Mevallur Kuppam village. It offered numerous water activities, water slides being the favorite amongst visitors. A few other attractions Dash N Splash offered were the wave slide, free-fall slide and spiral slide. This water park also had swimming pools, an artificial rainfall shower and a water fall for all ages.

== Location ==
It was located near Poonamallee on Chennai- Bangalore National Highway (NH4) 30 kilometers (19 mi) from Chennai, on 21 acres (8.5 ha) on the banks of the Telugu Ganga project canal in Melvarkuppam Village close to Saveetha Engineering College.
