= Kishkinta =

Theme park in Chennai, India

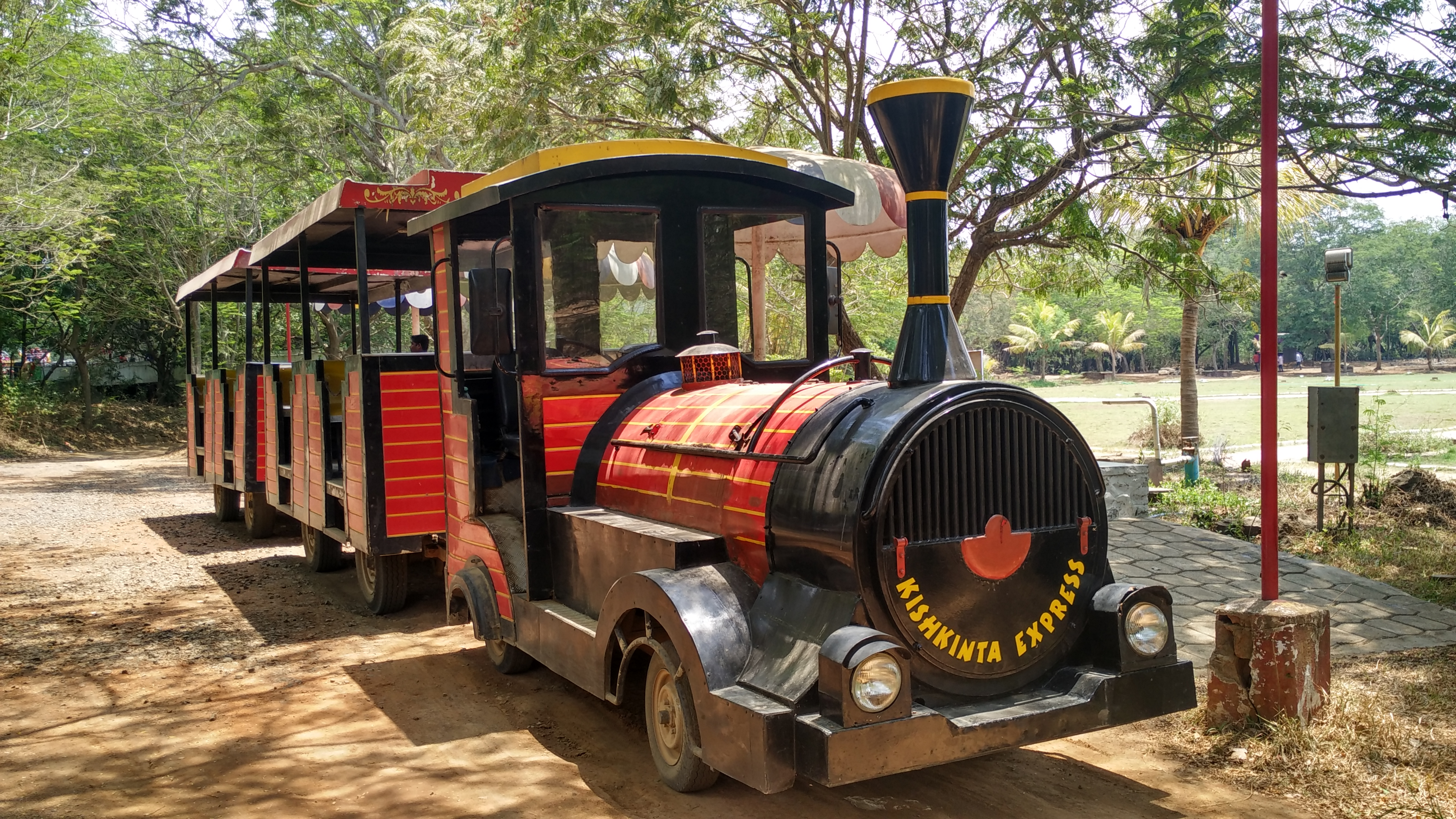
- Train in Kiskinta
- Interactive map of Kishkinta
- Location: Chennai, Tamil Nadu, India
- Coordinates: 12.93914°N 80.07785°E
- Status: Defunct
- Opened: August 1995
- Closed: June 2016

Kishkinta was a theme park located in Chennai, India. It was founded by Navodaya Appachan, the owner of Navodaya Studio. The park named after the fabled simian kingdom in the epic Ramayana. It spread across 120 acres (49 ha) of vast area with a scenic landscape, bushes, fountains, decorations and designs. Along with these, the park had various entertainment such as wave pools, water rides, roller coasters, and toy trains, especially for children who visited for picnics.

Following a fatal accident caused by a Disk'O ride malfunction, this theme park was closed in June 2016 for safety reasons.

== Controversies ==
Due to lack of proficient engineers for inspection and analysis, Kishkinta ride quality checks were done by amateurs, and for weight tests, labourers were forced to participate. One such incident resulted in the death of a young labourer.
