= Kovai Kondattam =

Water theme park in Tamil Nadu, India

Kovai Kondattam is a water theme park 2 km away from Perur Pateeswarar Temple on Siruvani Main Road and around 9.5 km from Coimbatore city. It is operated by Kovai Kondattam Amusement Park Pvt Ltd and features various attractions and facilities aimed at providing entertainment and leisure.

== Attractions ==
Attractions include a wave pool, a family pool, a kids' pool, water slides, waterfalls, bumper cars, a family train, a Ferris wheel, a Chair-O-Plane, Aqua Dance, a pirate ship, and a merry-go-round.
