= Kaeson Youth Park =

Amusement park in Pyongyang, North Korea

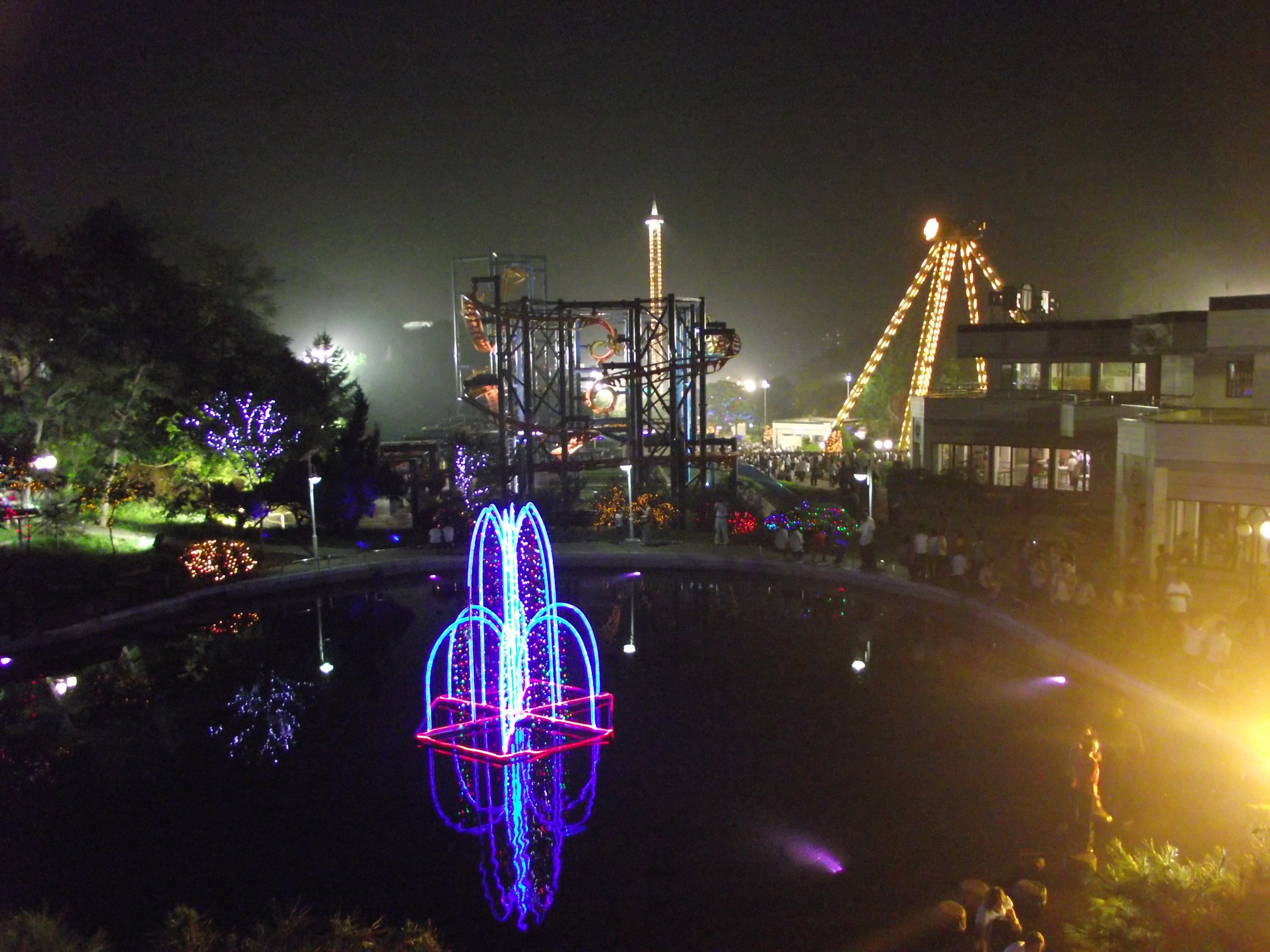
- Interactive map of Kaeson Youth Park
- Location: North Korea
- Coordinates: 39°2′52″N 125°45′29″E
- Opened: 1984
- Operating season: Year-round
- Area: 40 ha

Attractions
- Roller coasters: 1

The Kaeson Youth Park (Korean: 개선청년공원) is an amusement park located in Pyongyang, North Korea. The park, located near the Kim Il Sung Stadium and in the west foot of Moran Hill was opened in 1984, the park was opened as part of the Triumphal Arch dedication. It included a carousel, fun house and amusement park rides like the Ferris wheel, comprising an area of 40 hectares (99 acres).

In April 2010 the park was renovated, after which it was visited by Kim Jong Il. It was reported that riding all 10 amusements in the park costs 1,600 won.

A flying roller coaster, imported from Italy, opened in 2010. As of 2013, the rides on offer also included bumper cars, teacups, a swing ride and a double shot-like vertical drop.

== See also ==
- List of amusement parks in North Korea
