= Taesongsan Funfair =

Amusement park in North Korea

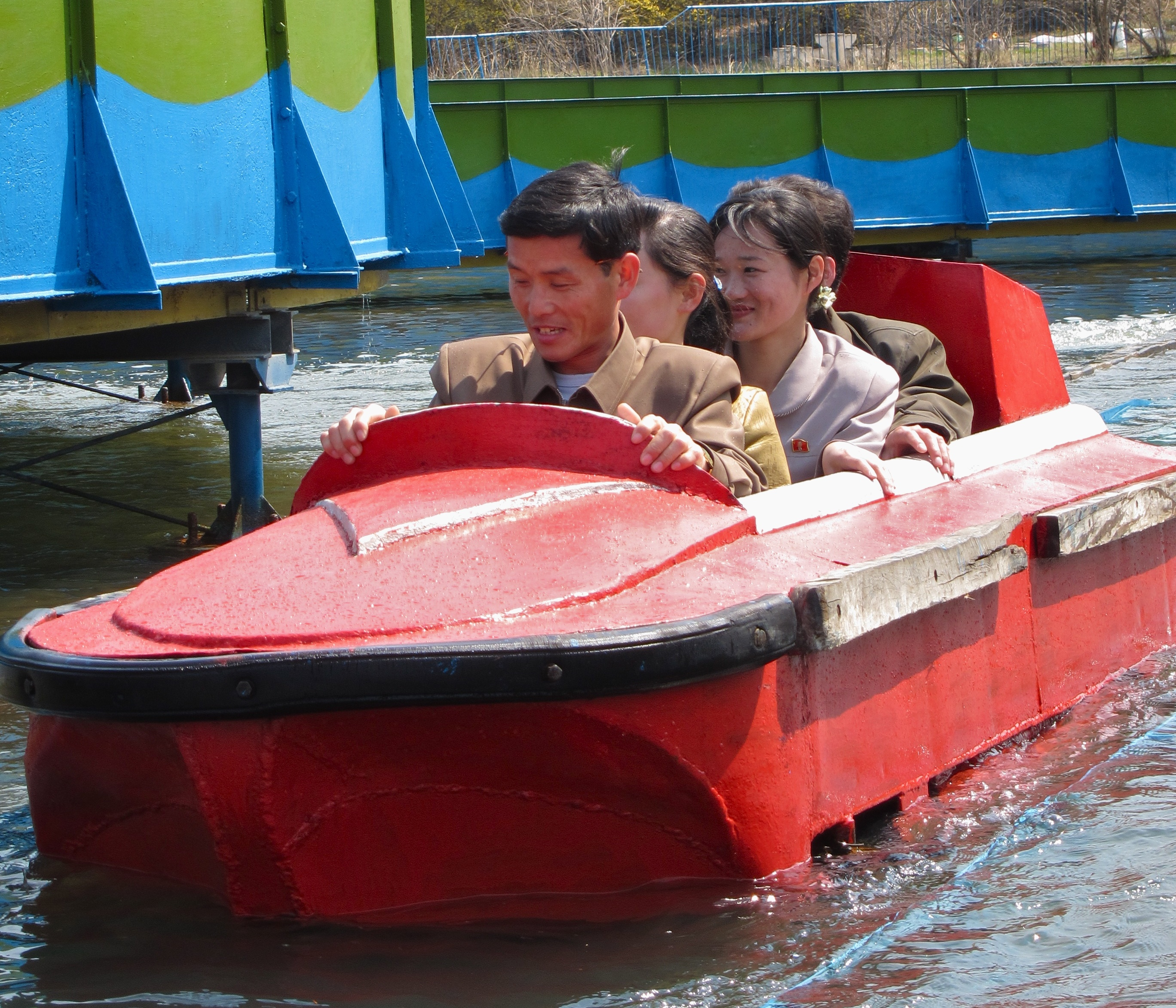
- Interactive map of Taesongsan Funfair
- Location: North Korea
- Coordinates: 39°4′28″N 125°49′42″E
- Opened: 1977
- Operating season: Year-round

The Taesongsan Funfair (Korean: 대성산유원지) is an amusement park located in Taesong-guyok, 12 kilometers from Pyongyang, North Korea. It was opened in 1977 and is at the foot of Mount Taesong. Total area is 180,000m^{2}, and contains 16 different rides.

== See also ==
- List of amusement parks in North Korea
