= Athisayam =

Amusement park in Madurai, India

Adhisayam
- Interactive map of Adhisayam
- Location: Madurai, Tamil Nadu, India
- Coordinates: 9.969355°N 78.040542°E
- Area: 70 acres (280,000 m^{2})
- Website: Official website

Athisayam (Tamil: அதிசயம்) is an amusement theme park located in Paravai on Madurai - Dindigul National Highway 7, 12 km from Madurai. The park is located on a 70 acres (280,000 m^{2}) site and features about 4 games and 2 water rides. The park is popular for its water rides, recreating the experience of Courtalam waterfalls.

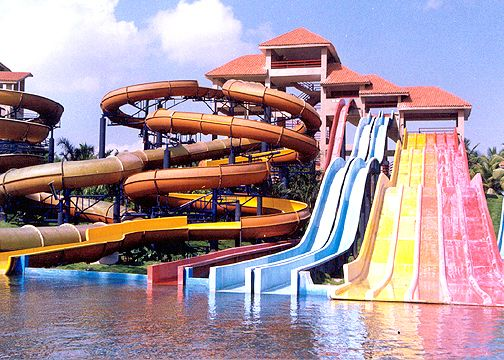
Athisayam theme park
