= Taesongsan =

Mountain in Pyongyang, North Korea

Taesŏngsan
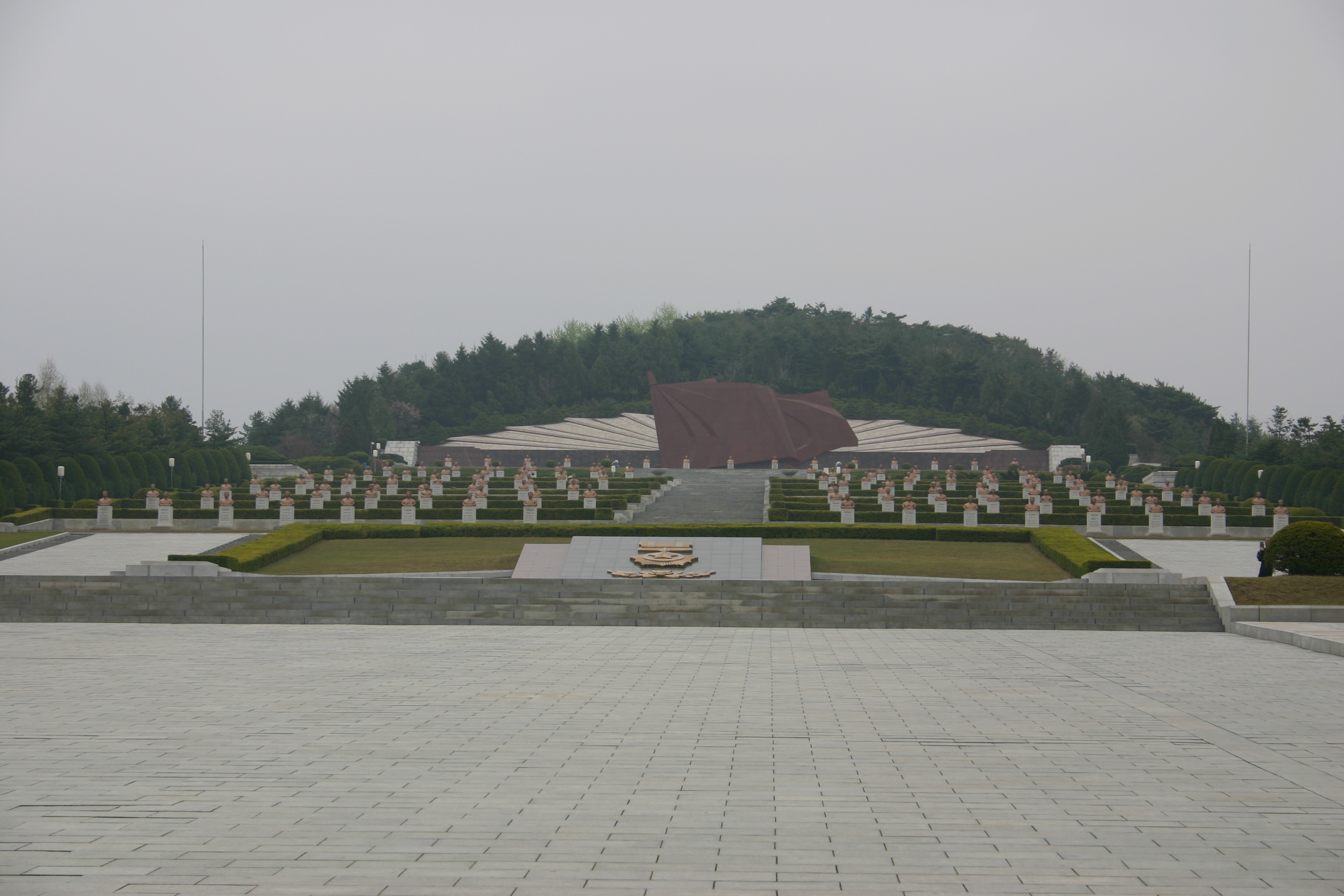
- The Revolutionary Martyrs' Cemetery (foreground) is located on the west side of Taesŏngsan

Highest point
- Coordinates: 39°4′26″N 125°49′42″E

Geography
- Location within North Korea
- Location: Taesong-guyok, Pyongyang, North Korea

Korean name
- Hangul: 대성산
- Hanja: 大城山
- RR: Daeseongsan
- MR: Taesŏngsan

Taesŏngsan (Korean: 대성산) is a mountain in Taesong-guyok, Pyongyang, North Korea. It has an elevation of 270 metres (890 ft). One popular visitor attraction on Taesŏngsan is the outdoor ice rink. Others include the Revolutionary Martyrs' Cemetery and the Korea Central Zoo.

In 2022, an ice cream manufacturing facility opened at the foot of Taesŏngsan under Kim Jong Un's order.

== See also ==
- List of mountains of Korea
