= List of water parks =

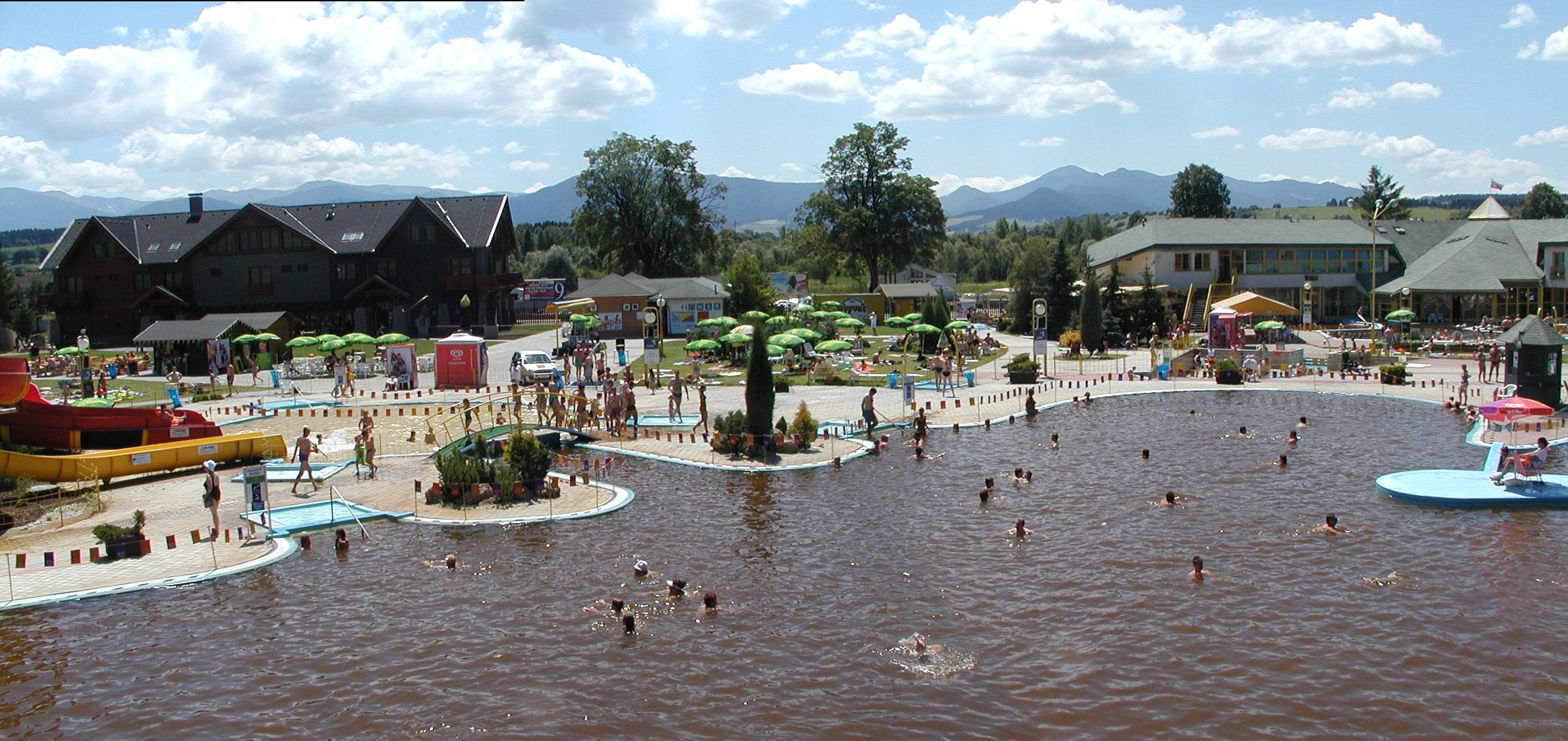
A thermal water park in Bešeňová, Slovakia

The following is a list of notable water parks in the world sorted by region. A water park or waterpark is an amusement park that features water play areas, such as water slides, splash pads, spraygrounds (water playgrounds), lazy rivers, wave pools, or other recreational bathing, swimming, and barefooting environments.

== Defunct water parks ==
=== Belgium ===
- Océade, Brussels Closed on September 30, 2018

=== Canada ===
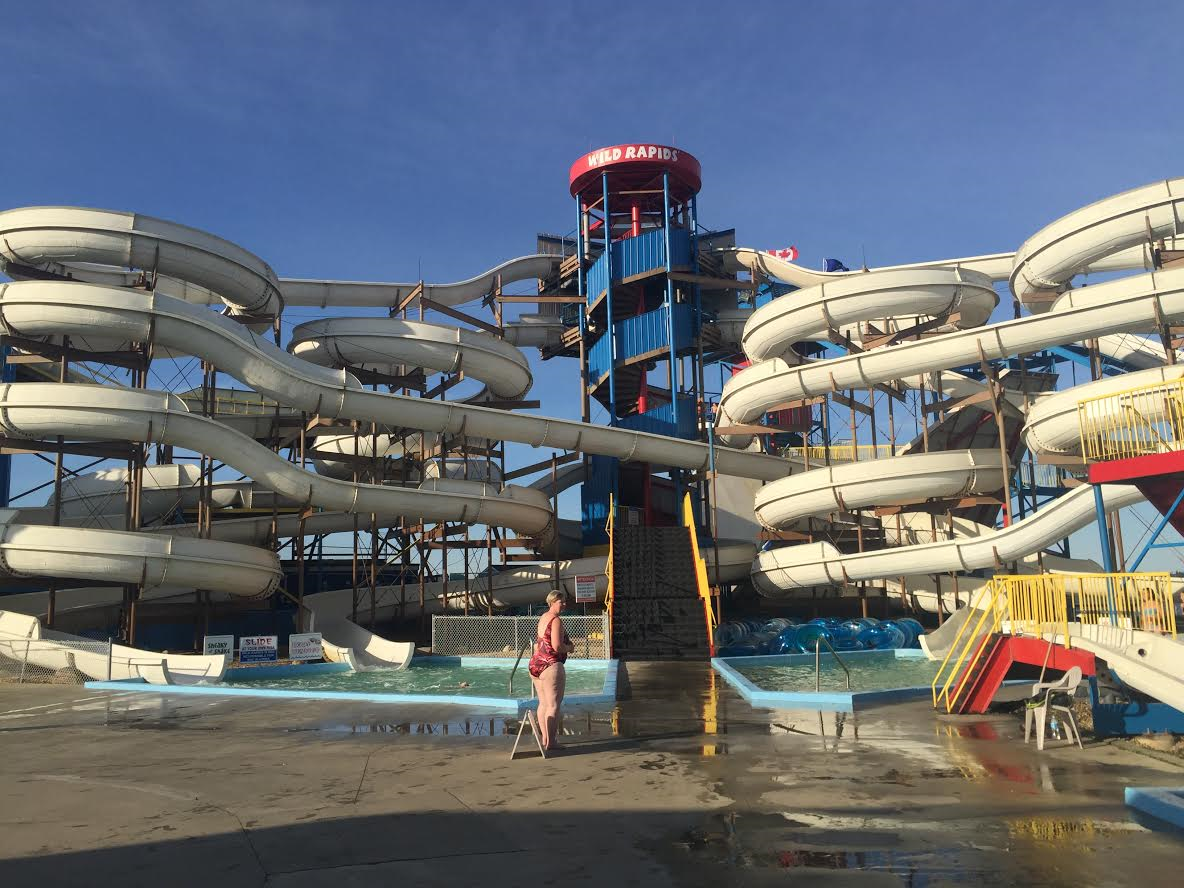
A view of Wild Rapids Waterslide Park

- Wild Rapids Waterslide Park, Sylvan Lake, Alberta – closed in 2016
- Froster Soak City at Ontario Place, Toronto, Ontario – closed in 2012
- Wild Waters in Edmonton, Alberta - closed in 2012
- Bonzai Waterslide Park in Calgary, Alberta - closed in mid-1990s
- Surf City near Chestermere Lake, Alberta - closed in mid-1990s
- Riverside Amusement Parks in Medicine Hat, Alberta - closed in 2007
- Kenosee Superslides at Moose Mountain Provincial Park in Saskatchewan - closed in 2020

=== Germany ===
- Blub, Berlin – Closed in 2002

=== Greece ===
- Copa Copana, Skaramagas, – Closed on July 14, 2014

=== Indonesia ===
- Ciputra Waterpark, Surabaya – closed as of 2021
- Circus Waterpark, Bali – closed as of 2020
- Pandawa Water World, Surakarta – closed as of 2024
- Snowbay, Jakarta – closed as of 2022

=== Japan ===
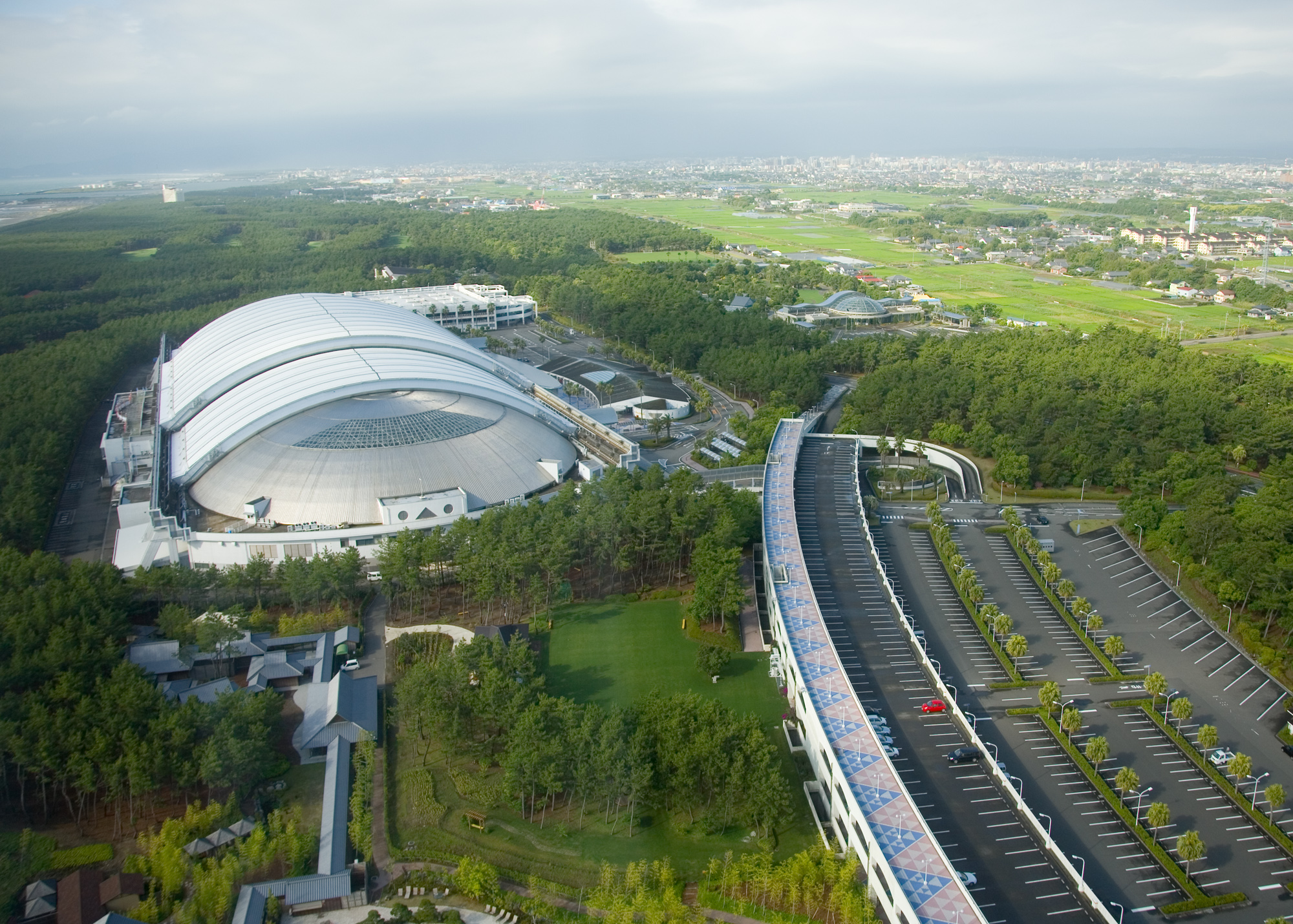
Exterior view of Seagaia Ocean Dome

- Seagaia Ocean Dome, Miyazaki – closed as of 2007
- Sports World Izunagaoka, Shizuoka - Closed in 1996
- Wild Blue Yokohama, Yokohama - Closed on August 31, 2001

=== Latvia ===
- Akvalande, Riga – Closed on November 5, 2014, due to safety concerns.
- Nemo Akvaparks, Jūrmala – Date of closure unknown.

=== Lithuania ===
- Trasalis, Trakai – Closed on January 15, 2020

=== Montenegro ===
- Aquapark Budva, Podostrog – Closed due to not paying taxes somewhere in 2024

=== Netherlands ===
- Nationaal Zwemcentrum de Tongelreep, Eindhoven – the recreational part has been closed since September 2016

=== Palestinian territories ===
- Crazy Water Park, Gaza Strip – burned down in arson attack

=== Poland ===
- Lemon Park, Władysławowo – Closed on August 21, 2014, after a roof collapse

=== Russia ===
- Transvaal Park, Moscow – in 2004, 28 people were killed when a roof collapsed

=== United Kingdom ===
- Fantaseas, Dartford, Kent and Chingford, London - Both closed in 1992
- Leith Waterworld, Edinburgh - Closed in January 2012
- Wet N Wild (North Shields), North Shields - Closed in 2020

=== United States ===
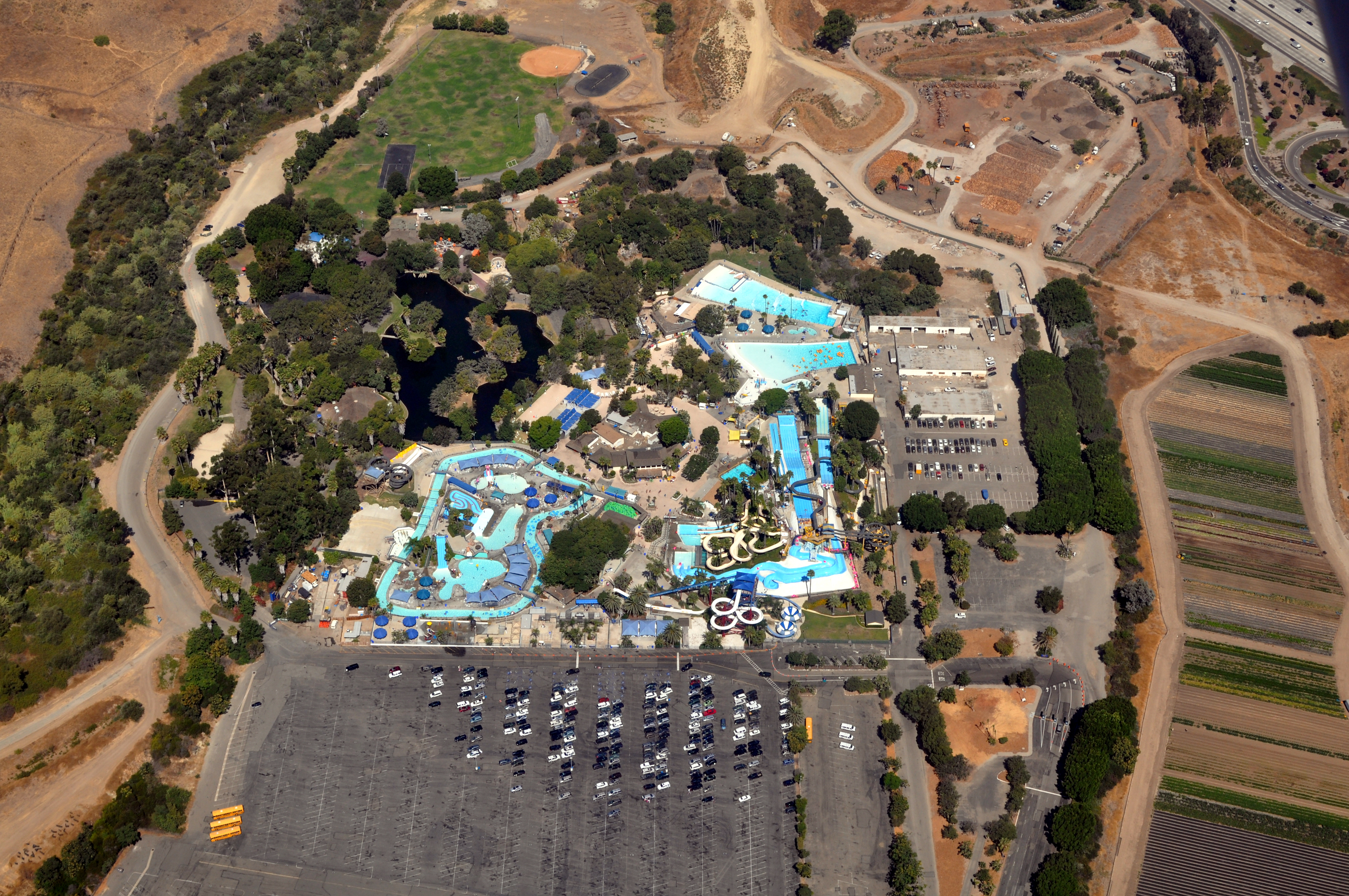
Wild Rivers water park in 2010

- Big Surf, Tempe - Closed in 2019
- CoCo Key Water Resort, various locations
- Disney's River Country, Lake Buena Vista, Florida - Closed in 2001
- Fort Rapids, Columbus, Ohio - Closed in 2016
- Heritage USA, Fort Mill, South Carolina - Closed in 1989
- Key Lime Cove, Gurnee, Illinois; now named Great Wolf Lodge - Closed in 2017 (Key Lime Dove)
- Lake Dolores Waterpark, Newberry Springs, California
- Manteca Waterslides, Manteca, California
- Maui Sands Resort & Indoor Water Park, Sandusky
- Pleasure Island, Muskegon, Michigan
- Schlitterbahn Waterpark Kansas City, Kansas City, Kansas - Closed in 2018
- Six Flags Atlantis, Hollywood, Florida
- Splash Amarillo Waterpark, Amarillo, Texas
- Splash Down Dunes, Porter, Indiana
- Splash Kingdom Waterpark, Redlands, California)
- Splashtown San Antonio, San Antonio, Texas
- Water Park of America, Bloomington, Minnesota
- Wet 'n Wild, Garland, Texas
- Wet 'n Wild Orlando, Orlando, Florida
- Wild Waters, Ocala, Florida
- Wildwater Kingdom, Aurora, Ohio

=== Vietnam ===
- Hồ Thủy Tiên - Closed in the early 2000s, re-opened in 2006 and re-closed in 2011
- Saigon Water Park, Ho Chi Minh City - Closed in 2006

== See also ==
- Lists of amusement parks
