= Pleasure Island (Muskegon, Michigan water park) =

Water park in Muskegon, Michigan

Coordinates: 43°07′56″N 86°14′40″W

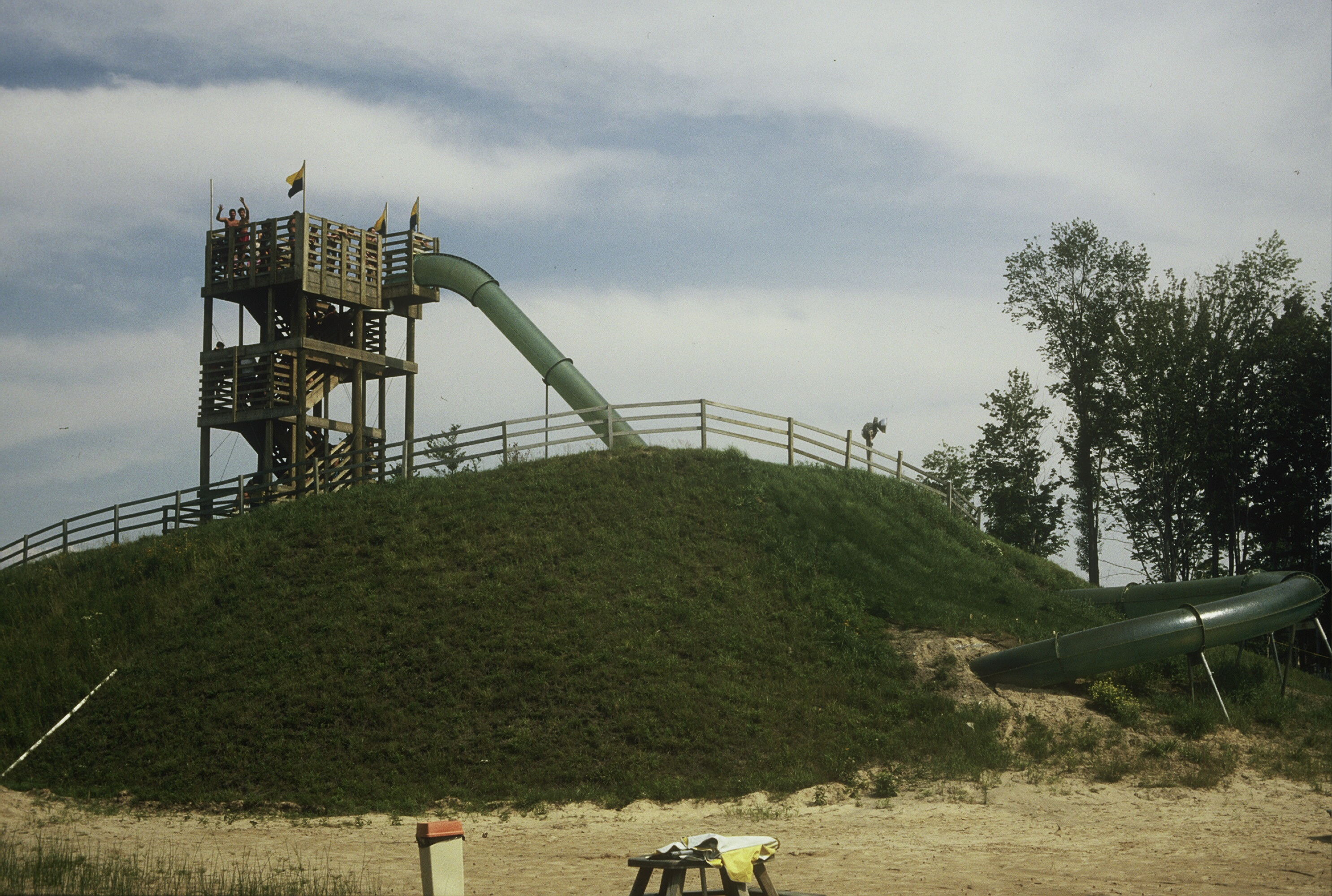
The Black Hole, Pleasure Island (Muskegon, Michigan water park) 1986

Pleasure Island Water Theme Park was a water park located on 25 acres (100,000 m^{2}) in Muskegon, Michigan located at 99 E. Pontaluna Road.

The park operated in the 1980s and 1990s, consisting of 13 water slides, mini golf, a beach with zip line, paddle boats, gas-powered bumper boats, a lazy river, and a children' swim area with three small water slides. The feature attraction was a water slide named the Black Hole which was built into a hill and started out with a steep drop which then circled back into the hill, finally coming out of the hill into a pool of water at the base. Pleasure Island was also known for the food served at the Weenie Hut.

When nearby Michigan's Adventure added its WildWater Adventure water park, the competition was too much and Pleasure Island closed. The park was auctioned off in 1997. The property later became a subdivision, named Windflower Bay.

== See also ==
- List of water parks
