= Saigon Water Park =

Former Vietnamese water park

Coordinates: 10.840635°N 106.74509°E

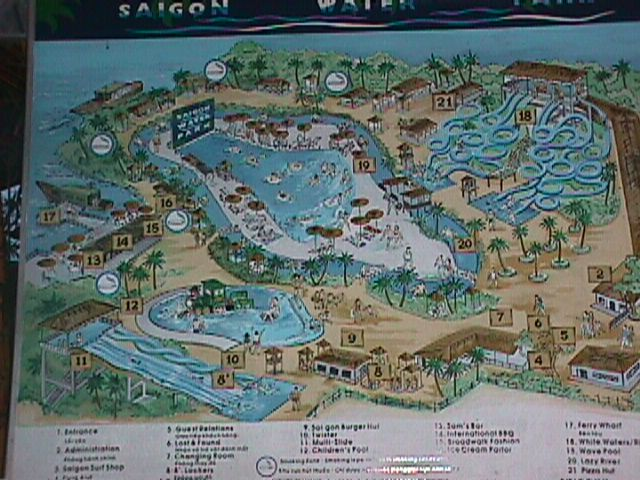
Saigon Water Park guide map

Saigon Water Park was a water park in Linh Đông, Thủ Đức District, Ho Chi Minh City. It was the first water park to be built in the city. The park was situated on Saigon River and Gò Dưa Canal, about 10 km to the northeast of city center. It existed from 1997 to 2006.

== Financial difficulties ==
The park encountered financial difficulty after the opening of a number of other competitor water parks in Ho Chi Minh City. Investors are in the process of re-zoning the land from leisure to residential. All of the water park's equipment has been sold and removed. Many guide-books and travel websites still refer tourists to this tourist attraction, although it has closed.

== Gallery ==
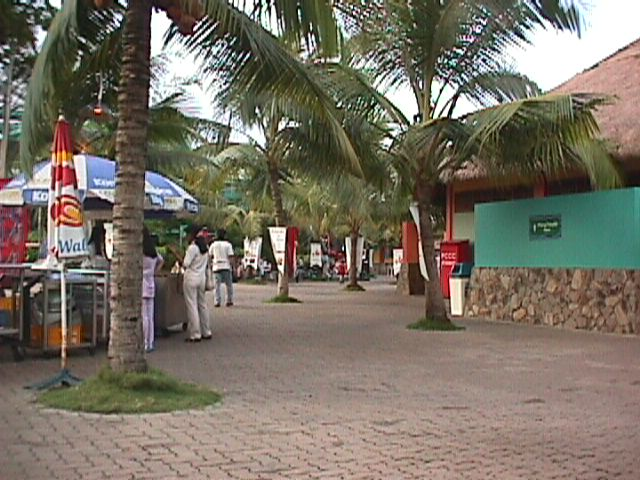
Inside Saigon Water Park

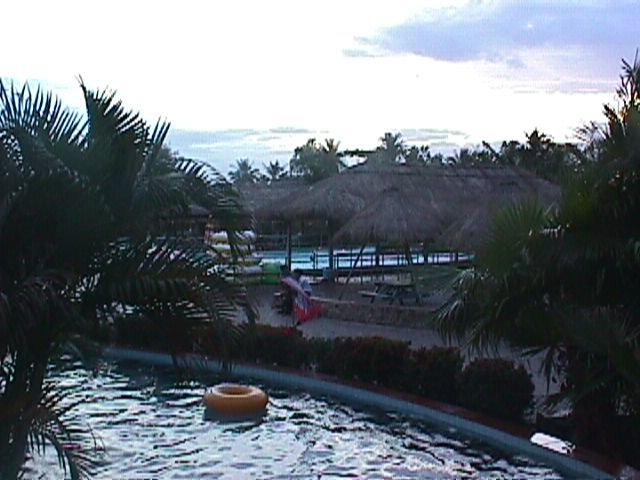
Lazy river

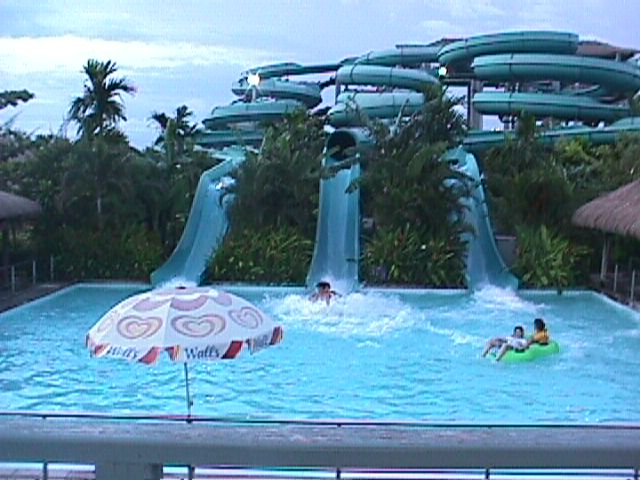
Looping water slide

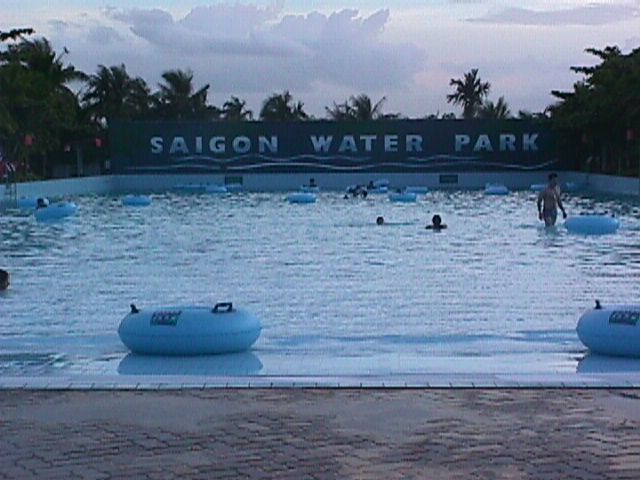
Artificial beach

== See also ==
- List of water parks
