= Chula Vista Resort =

Waterpark resort in Wisconsin, United States

Coordinates: 43°39′52″N 89°47′04″W

Chula Vista Resort is a southwestern-themed waterpark resort in Wisconsin Dells, Wisconsin. The resort is located on the Upper Dells of the Wisconsin River, 3 miles (4.8 km) north of downtown.

== History ==
Chula Vista has been in existence since the late 19th century, when Irwin Berry purchased Coldwater Canyon Farm in 1874. He began taking in guests in 1884. It was only one vacation home on the Wisconsin River. He called it Berry's Coldwater Canyon Hotel. He expanded it into several stand alone buildings and a dining hall by the time of his death in 1919. His son Clinton Dewitt Berry took over the hotel when his father died and expanded it to include one of the first golf courses in Wisconsin in 1923, Berry's Dells Golf Course and he also built a tennis court. Clinton also owned the Dells-Barboo airport which he built in 1926. His nephew Roland Berry took over running the hotel in 1934. Roland closed down the hotel in 1956 after the rerouting of Highway 13 but he kept the golf course open. He died in a boating accident in the Florida Keys in 1958 and the hotel was sold in 1960. Joe and Vera Kaminski became innkeepers at the hotel in 1952, and later purchased the entire complex from the Berry Family.

Chula Vista is currently owned and operated by Jeff Kaminski and Krissy Kaminski-Sigmund, children of Mike and Ann Kaminski. Previously owned and operated by Mike and Tim Kaminski, who are the grandsons of Joe and Vera. The resort was renamed to Chula Vista Theme Resort, and a new main hotel building was constructed, along with a new outdoor pool area.

In the 1990s, Chula Vista added a 120,000-square-foot (11,000 m^{2}) outdoor waterpark and a 30,000 indoor waterpark (which has been closed since 2008 due to the opening of the Lost Rios Indoor Waterpark).

=== 2006 Expansion ===
In 2006, Chula Vista Theme Resort dropped the "Theme" from its name, becoming just Chula Vista Resort. Also, Chula Vista completed a $200 million expansion of the entire resort, including a new 80,000 sq ft. multilevel indoor waterpark, a redesigned 18 hole Coldwater Canyon Golf Course, a condominium wing added onto the existing resort, golf villas along the fairways, an outdoor wave pool along the Wisconsin River, a riverwalk spanning the entire property, sand volleyball courts, a kiddie lazy river, a new steakhouse, and 26,000 square feet (2,400 m^{2}) of convention space. This expansion turned Chula Vista into one of the premier waterpark resorts in the Wisconsin Dells and became one of the largest resorts in the Dells at 620 rooms.

Lost Rios Indoor Waterpark

- Opened in 2006
- 80,000 sq ft. multilevel indoor waterpark
- Fly'n Mayan (2006), WhiteWater Zip Coaster
  - 635 ft long
  - One of two WhiteWater Zip Coasters ever built and last one in existence
    - Kalahari Sandusky closed theirs in 2020
- Matador Mat Racers (2006), WhiteWater Whizzard
- Python Plunge (2006), WhiteWater Speed Body Slide
- Emerald Falls (2006), WhiteWater Tube Slide (single tubes only)
- Ruby Run (2006), WhiteWater Tube Slide
- Jungle Adventure (2006), WhiteWater SuperBowl
- Mount Montezuma’s Mayan Temple (2006), WhiteWater AquaPlay
- Rio Rapids Action River (2006)
- Croc Walk Water Crossing (2006)
- Incatinka Kiddie Play Area (2006)
- Lava Lagoon Activity Pool (2006)
- Jacuzzi Hot Tub (2006)

Adventure Lagoon Outdoor Waterpark

- 120,000 square-foot outdoor waterpark
- Opened in 1992
- The Cyclone (2008), Waterfun Products Aquawiz Vortex
  - Replaced Gator Tail
- Durango Drop (2002), Waterfun Products Jetstream Speed Slide
- Adventure Lagoon Body Flumes (2000), Proslide
  - Rattlesnake Run, Proslide Twister
  - The Sidewinder, Proslide Kidz
  - The Chute, Proslide Kidz
- Switchback Canyon (2002), Waterfun Products Sidewinder MK-I
- Red Rock Racer (2002), Waterfun Products Surfhill Racer
- Wave Pool (2004)
- Cactus Cove
- Adventure Lagoon
- Sulfur Springs
- Former Attractions
  - Gator Tail (2002), Waterfun Products Backlash

Coyote Mountain Indoor Waterpark

- 30,000 square foot indoor waterpark
- Built in 1998 and closed in 2008
- Canyon Rock Ruin (1998), Proslide Kidz Twister
- Coyote Mountain (1998), Two Proslide Kidz Twisters
- Cougar Crossing (1998), water walk activity pool
- El Nino (1998), Children's play area and wading pool
- Forgotten Falls (1998), hot tub
- Water Basketball (1998)

=== Wisconsin Dells Center ===
In 2007, Chula Vista constructed a new sports dome just south of the resort complex. It is home to many sports finals and events in Wisconsin and the Midwest. Also, concerts, indoor football, and trade shows take place at the Wisconsin Dells Center.
