= Leith Waterworld =

Water park in Leith, Edinburgh, Scotland

Coordinates: 55°58′12″N 3°10′16″W

Leith Waterworld was a leisure pool in Leith, Edinburgh, Scotland. It was built on the site of the former Leith Central railway station. It was one of only two pools in Edinburgh with flumes, and there was also a fast river run. It was closed in January 2012 in order to save funds for the Royal Commonwealth Pool's renovation and re-opening. A campaigning group against the closure, called Splashback, were funded to carry out feasibility studies but the property has been converted into a children's soft-play centre.

== History ==
The pool opened in 1992, and was then closed in November 1999 after problems were found including tiles coming away from walls, electrical problems and rusting structures. It reopened in 2002 and a new multisensory play area was introduced in 2003. Repairs were estimated to have cost £270,000. There were previous threats to close the pool to save money in 1997 and 2005.

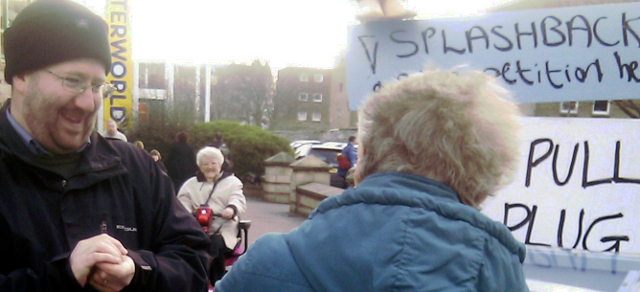
Splashback campaign event, 2012

On 22 December 2011 Edinburgh Council voted to close the pool. It closed on 8 January 2012. Campaigners continued to protest and lodged an official complaint against the closure. The closed pool became an issue in the Edinburgh 2012 elections, referenced at local hustings. In September 2012, Splashback's bid to reopen the facility was rejected and they were told to come back with a better submission. In May 2013 the decision was made to accept a proposal to redevelop the premises as a soft-play area. Splashback accused Edinburgh councillor Richard Lewis of breaking his word about reopening the pool.

== In culture ==
Leith Waterworld is preserved in digital form in the map ttt_waterworld in the game Garry's Mod, specifically in the game mode Trouble in Terrorist Town (TTT).

== See also ==
- List of water parks
