= Water Park of America =

Former water park

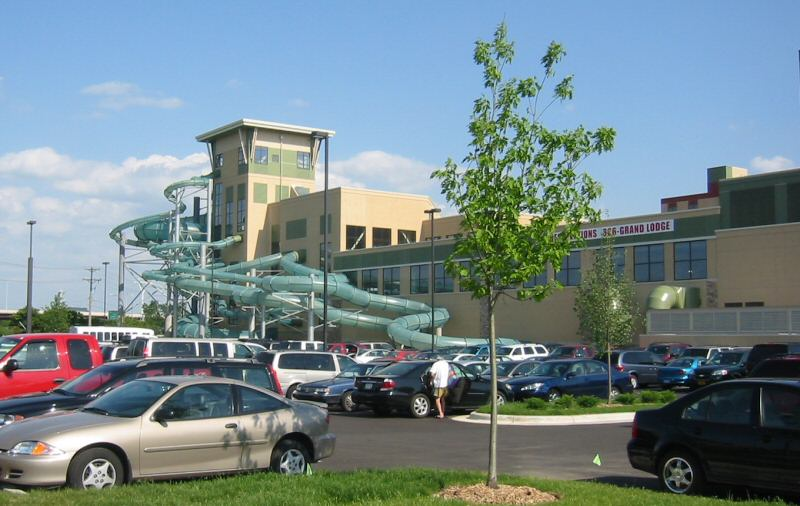
- The north side of the park. Water slide tubes exit the slide tower and re-enter the building.
- Location: Bloomington, Minnesota, United States
- Coordinates: 44°51′40″N 93°15′04″W
- Owner: Great Wolf Resorts
- Opened: May 2006
- Status: Operating

Great Wolf Lodge, originally the Water Park of America, was home to the tallest indoor water slide in the U.S. It covers 70,000 square feet (6,500 m^{2}) with a slide tower nearly ten stories high. It opened in May 2006. Located in Bloomington, Minnesota, it is a half mile from the Mall of America and close to the Minneapolis-Saint Paul International Airport.

The water park was attached to the Radisson Hotel. Both the hotel and the water park were managed by Evolution Hospitality. In January 2017, it was announced that Great Wolf Resorts had purchased the property. The hotel and waterpark closed for renovations and rebranding as a Great Wolf Resort. Great Wolf reopened the property in December 2017.

== Water rides ==
The park had a slide tower containing several water slides and an open area at ground level that contained water rides.

The slide tower contained three body slides, two body slides, and one family slide (this was the tallest slide, starting at the tenth level of the building and ending at the bottom). Body slides are slides on which riders slide directly on their body, without an inner tube. The family raft had 7000+ GPM at all times when running.

On the 7th floor there were two tube slides that connected to the lazy river at the end of the ride.

=== Ground level ===
Below the slide tower was a wave pool, a lazy river, a swimming pool, a small pool with floating "logs" which children leapt across, a flow rider, two hot-tubs, and a children's area for smaller children.

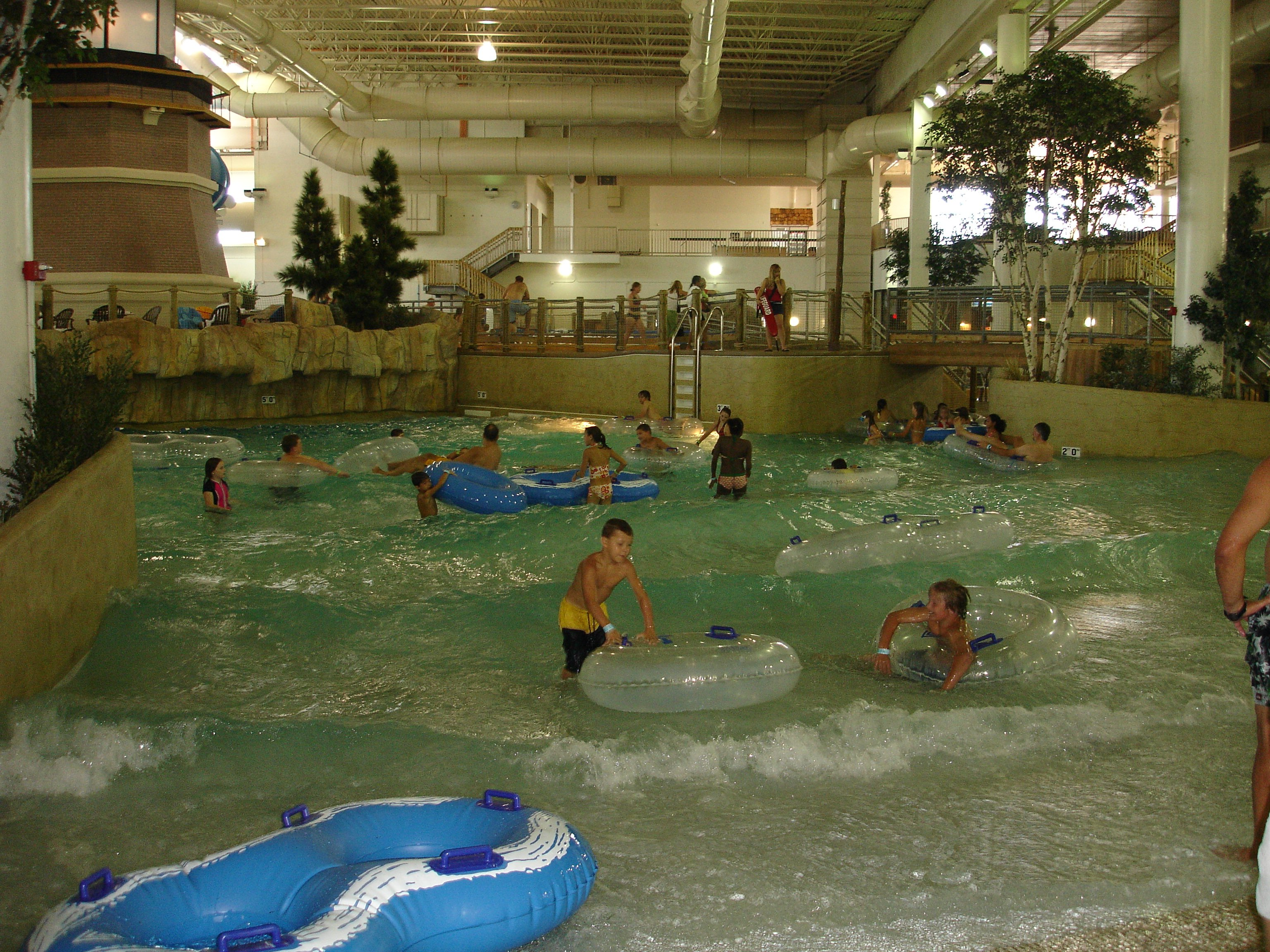
Wave Pool

The wave pool was a tapered pool that started with a beach entry and became about five and a half feet deep. It was the beginning and end of the lazy river. The wave pool ran for ten minutes and was then turned off for five minutes to let the machine that produced the waves cool.

The lazy river was three feet deep and made a circuit around the outer perimeter of the park. The lazy river was ridden on a one-person or two-person inner tube through “caves,” under bridges and waterfalls, and past pools. The ride ended in the wave pool.

The swimming pool, also known as the "activity pool," was four feet deep. One end had four basketball hoops for games of water ball, the other end was for general swimming.

Next to the swimming pool was a smaller pool that had floating cross-sections of “logs” attached to the floor of the pool like lily pads. Suspended above the pool was a cargo net for children to hold onto as they jumped from log to log.

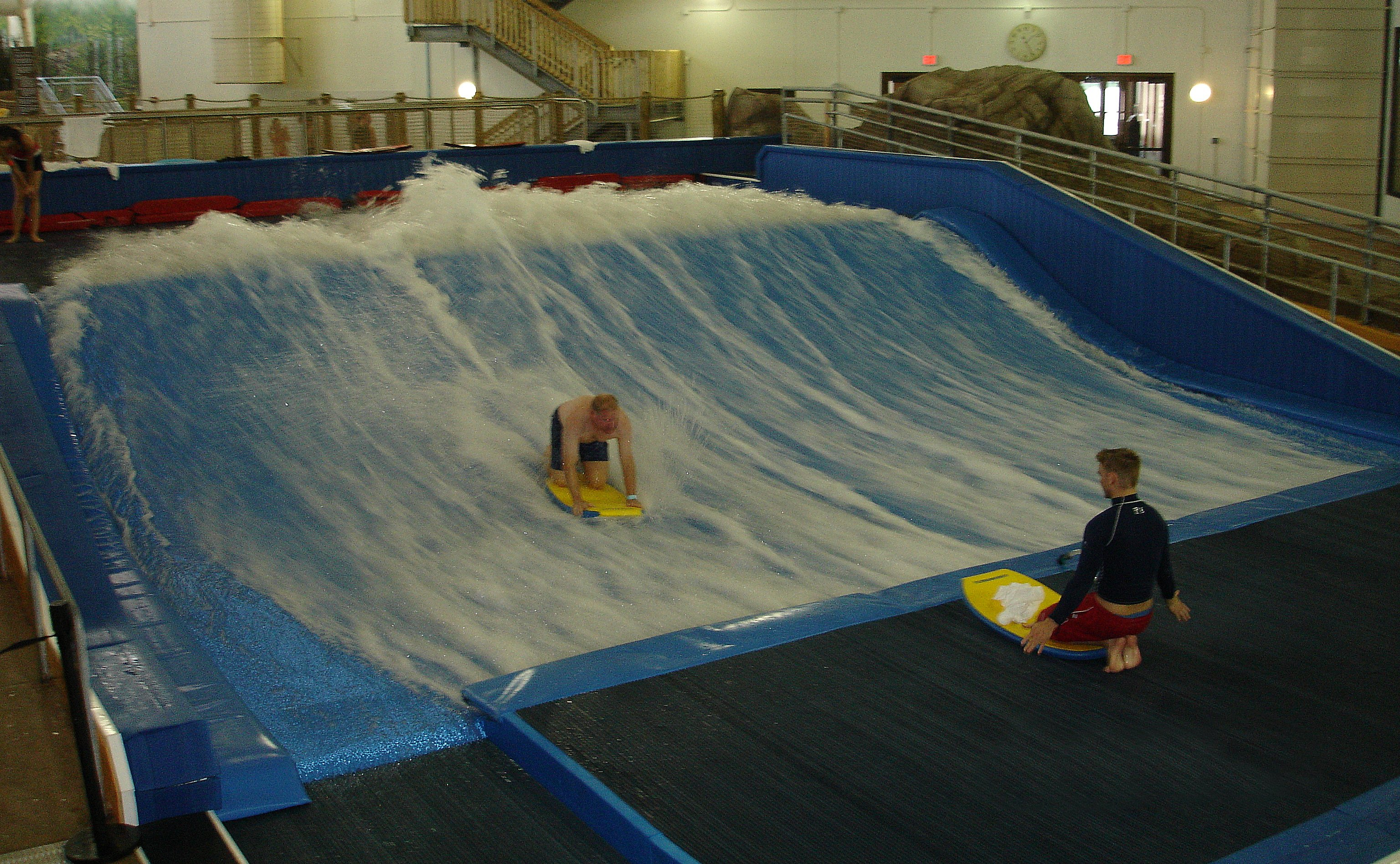
Flow Rider

The flow rider was a shallow sheet of water, moving from 30–35 miles per hour, on which the rider could surf or "boogie-board". The water depth of the flow rider was 3 inches (76 mm).

The park had two cave-pool themed hot tubs.

The children’s playground area contained a playground with stairs that led to towers, cargo netting, and slides sitting in a few inches of warm water. At the top of the playground was a wooden bucket that filled with water. Once full, it dumped water on anyone below, resulting in laughter and excitement from the children. The children’s playground had three water slides. The playground contained numerous other water toys and devices.

=== Life-vests ===
The water park also provided free life-vests for children which could be brought as long as one was a Coast Guard approved flotation device.

=== Northern Lights Arcade ===
The Northern Lights Arcade was located between the entrance to the water park and the main lobby of the hotel. The arcade primarily consisted of redemption games. It included games such as Pac-Man, Pinball, Initial D, Maximum Tune, and Pump It Up.

== Characters ==
Before the Great Wolf Lodge takeover, the water park had its own set of characters geared towards children. They were known as Hobey and Friends.

Hobey the Bear was the Water Park of America’s main mascot. He was named after the Hobey Baker award, which was fitting as his favorite sport was hockey. Hobey hailed from Eveleth, Minnesota, and enjoyed fishing, picking berries, and wandering the North Woods. Despite being from Minnesota, Hobey preferred warm and humid weather. In fact, his love for warmer temperature is what brought him to Water Park of America. When he wasn't busy surfing the Cascade Falls FlowRider or sliding down the Eagles Nest 10th Floor Body Slide, Hobey enjoyed making sure that everyone enjoyed their time at Water Park of America.

Garry the Groundhog is a distant cousin of Goldy Gopher, the famous and much-beloved mascot for the University of Minnesota sports teams. Garry liked to keep a decidedly lower profile, basking in the warm waters of the St. Croix Lazy River, snacking on berries and nuts, and finding cozy spaces to burrow and take a nap. He also loved to help water park guests have a great time at the park.

Ollie the Otter joined the team at Water Park of America after Hobey saw him fishing on the banks of the Minnesota River. After showing Hobey some tricks of the trade, Ollie was invited to join the helpful team at Water Park of America. Ollie enjoyed eating seafood and swimming when he wasn't having fun with guests at the park.

Roxi the Raccoon was more commonly known as the happiest raccoon in Minnesota. She loved eating delicious food at the Water Park of America and snoozing near the FlowRider.

== Controversy ==
=== Lawsuit ===
Shortly before opening day, the Mall of America filed a lawsuit against Water Park of America claiming trademark infringement. The Mall of America claimed the water park's name was too similar to the Mall of America's name and could cause association between the two. The Water Park of America filed a counterclaim in the matter accusing the Mall of America of knowing about Water Park of America's use of the name since the fall of 2003, encouraging the use of the name, and encouraging the Water Park of America to spend millions of dollars advertising and promoting the name up until March 2006, among other things. Water Park of America went on to claim that the reason Mall of America changed its position became clear in a press release, in which the Mall of America announced it was going to build its own water park as part of Phase II. The parties settled the dispute under confidential terms.

== See also ==
- Incidents at independent amusement parks – list of significant accidents and injuries that have occurred at various water parks
- Indoor water park
- List of water parks
- Water park
