= Fantasea =

Fantasea is a word play on fantasy and sea. It may refer to:

== Shipping ==
- Fantasea Cruising, operating ferries and water taxis on Sydney Harbour and Pittwater
- Fantaseas, a defunct chain of indoor waterparks in the United Kingdom
- Fantasea, a 1978 surf movie with Shaun Tomson

== Music ==
- Fantasea (mixtape), a mixtape by Azealia Banks
