= Last Bronx =

1996 video game

- Japanese arcade flyer
- Developer: Sega AM3
- Publisher: Sega
- Director: Akinobu Abe
- Producer: Yoshirō Akata
- Designer: Shinichi Nakagawa
- Platforms: Arcade, Sega Saturn, Windows, PlayStation 2
- Release: June 1996: Arcade; JP: June 1996; NA: July 1996 Saturn; JP: August 1, 1997; NA: October 20, 1997; EU: October 23, 1997 Windows; NA: February 19, 1998; JP: February 27, 1998; EU: 1998 PlayStation 2; JP: June 29, 2006 (as part of Sega Ages Vol. 24)
- Genre: Fighting
- Modes: Single-player, multiplayer
- Arcade system: Sega Model 2

Last Bronx (Note: Japanese: ラストブロンクス -東京番外地-, Hepburn: Rasuto Buronkusu ~Tōkyō Bangaichi~; lit. Last Bronx: Tokyo Extra Earth) is a 1996 fighting video game developed by Sega AM3 on the Sega Model 2 mainboard. It was released in Japanese and American arcades before home versions were produced for the Sega Saturn and Windows systems in 1997. Set in a crime-ridden Tokyo, the game follows rival street gangs who take part in a weapon fighting tournament. Last Bronx became a big hit in Japan, and received several multimedia adaptations, including a 1996 direct-to-video film, Last Bronx: Tokyo Bangaichi, as well as a novelisation, manga and radio drama. On June 29, 2006, Sega released Last Bronx on PlayStation 2 as a tenth anniversary celebration.

== Gameplay ==
Each match is a best out of two rounds fight with victory by knock out or remaining health at the end of the 30-second time limit. The stages are set in real Tokyo city closed areas without any ring outs. However, fighters can jump on the barriers (and eventually make a disqualifying ring out backflip from there).

Sega AM3 used the "PKG" 3-button system introduced by the AM2 in Virtua Fighter – "P" stands for "Punch" (or weapon), "K" for "Kick" and "G" for "Guard". The player uses the arcade joystick to move the character. Certain joystick and button combinations result in special attacks and combination attacks. The "G" button is used to block the opponent's attacks and to perform a feint attack called "Attack Cancel". Strong attacks, throws and rolling moves can be performed using different button combinations. Taunts can also be used – Last Bronx is part of the rare games in which the CPU uses this feature against the player or even another CPU controlled character.

== Plot ==
Last Bronx is set in an alternate version of post-Japanese bubble Tokyo, where youth disenchantment and disillusion with Japan's explosive economic and societal progression lead into the culmination of the historic violent underground event known as the All Tokyo Street Wars, and into an era where crime and gang warfare is rampant.

Upon the peak of the All Tokyo Street Wars, a bōsōzoku gang known as Soul Crew made an explosive rise to power, uniting Tokyo's youth and gangs by their philosophy of Free Soul and enforcing their will by both negotiations and unstoppable and unmatched fighting prowess. This would lead into a brief lived ceasefire however, as soon shortly after, the leader of Soul Crew would be grisly murdered, leading into the Second All Tokyo Street Wars upon his death. Immediately, a message was made by a mysterious group known as Redrum, who demanded a tournament of fair dueling be engaged by the leaders of all of Tokyo's strongest gangs to know who would rule over all of Tokyo's streets. Dismissed by all who read it at first, this treatise would soon be exemplified by the discovery of missing gang members found dead in Tokyo Bay. Now with the Tokyo's street gang underworld's attention, the Second All Tokyo Street War Tournament, or The Last Bronx, would be able to begin.

=== Characters ===
The game has the following main characters:

- Yusaku Kudo (voiced by Kazuki Yao) is the boss of the bosozoku street gang "Neo-Soul" from Haneda airport. Once the number three man of Soul Crew, Yusaku takes it upon his leader's death to finish what Soul Crew started. His preferred weapon is a metal sansetsukon; his in-game alternate weapon was a Shinkansen scale model.
- Joe Inagaki (voiced by Kaneto Shiozawa) is the boss of the western "chopper" styled bosozoku "Shinjuku Mad" gang from Shinjuku. Once the number two man of Soul Crew, Joe left the gang shortly after, seeking his own independence and leaving Soul Crew's leadership to Yusaku, and engages in The Last Bronx as a test of his skills and thrills. His preferred weapons are metal nunchaku; his in-game alternate weapons are corn ears. Though nunchaku and images of nunchaku were banned in the United Kingdom at the time, Sega convinced the British Board of Film Classification to allow Joe's nunchaku to appear uncensored in the PAL release of the Saturn version.
- Saburo Zaimoku (voiced by Tesshō Genda) is the boss of the "Katsushika Dumpsters" gang from Katsushika. Once a member of Soul Crew, Zaimoku left upon the death of their leader, and reformed himself by working at his family's construction business. When Redrum threatens his workers in attempts to blackmail him to the Last Bronx, Zaimoku starts up the Katsushika Dumpsters for his co-worker's self defense and sets off to the tournament on his own. Zaimoku's preferred weapon is the hammer; his in-game alternate weapon is a frozen tuna.
- Toru Kurosawa (voiced by Norio Wakamoto) is the boss of the "Roppongi Hard Core Boys" gang from Roppongi. One of Soul Crew's more unrepentant and ruthless enemies, the yankii playboy tough finds the Last Bronx the best chance to wipe out his rivals as the true rule of Tokyo's streets and the gang underworld. Kurosawa's preferred weapon is the bokuto (a wooden sword); his in-game alternate weapon is a folding fan.
- Nagi Hojo (voiced by Kikuko Inoue) is the boss of the women-only "Dogma" gang from the Rainbow Bridge area of Tokyo, as well as a sadist. Nagi's preferred weapon is the sai; her in-game alternate weapon is a spoon and fork.
- Yoko Kono (voiced by Megumi Ogata) is the boss of the "G-Troops" gang from the Tokyo subways. Originally an airsoft survival game group, the G-Troops then expanded into military martial arts training upon the bubble crash, but their renown eventually got them also caught up in the All Tokyo Street Wars. Yoko engages in the Last Bronx to end all of that, as well to find her missing brother, who was last seen dealing with Redrum. Yoko's preferred weapon is a pair of tonfa; her in-game alternate weapons are umbrellas.
- Ken Kono (voiced by Nobutoshi Canna) was the co-founder and former boss of the "G-Troop" gang. After refusing the Redrum challenge, Redrum badly injured him in a fire, and his anger made him mad and evil. Eventually, he was turned into Red Eye and himself became an agent for the mysterious Redrum ("Murder" backward) organization. In Yoko's ending, he is beaten by his sister Yoko at the tournament's final in the subway. Ken apologizes and tells his sister the truth, and then dies in her arms. Red Eye's preferred weapon is a metal tonfa; his in-game alternate weapons are chopsticks and broiled sauries.
- Hiroshi "Tommy" Tomiie (voiced by Nobuyuki Hiyama) is the boss of the "Helter Skelter" skateboarder gang from Shibuya. Originally from Osaka, Tommy created Helter Skelter to make space in Tokyo and keep unruly gangs from getting in the way of his and his group's boarding. When Redrum declares the Last Bronx to be official, Tommy also engages for many reasons; for thrills, to end the unruly street gang wars, and to impress his crush, Lisa Kusanami. Tommy's preferred weapon is the Bō (a long pole); his in-game alternate weapon is a deck brush. Tommy's stage, "Cross Street", features a Sonic mascot which is Sega Shibuya Game Center's logo.
- Lisa Kusanami (voiced by Miina Tominaga) is the Japanese-American leader of the "Orchids" music-band (and gang) from the moonlight garden in Takeshiba Passenger Ship Terminal. The daughter of a woman who was supposed to have been the next successor to the Kusanami school of martial arts from her grandfather, her mother left with her surrogate father, an American lawyer, for a wealthy life in the United States. Originally founding the Orchids to creatively escape her somewhat troubled home life, the Orchids would soon face them and their fans fighting off the denizens of Japan's street gang underworld upon their extortion, and this would soon lead into Redrum also including the Orchids into the Last Bronx, making for a fight that Lisa never intended. Lisa's preferred weapon is a double metal stick (aka "Double-sticks"); her in-game alternate weapon is a ladle and spatula.

=== Version differences ===
The "Saturn Mode", or "PC Mode" in the PC version, is a new story mode. The final fight between Yoko and her elder brother Red Eye is no longer the game's climax. The new plot was re-imagined as a complex network revolving around the Soul Crew duel of Yusaku versus Joe, around which all primary and secondary characters are linked to, for individual reasons. As a result, there is no more fixed fighting order with Red Eye as the last boss to beat. Instead the mode features a random route with Red Eye as a sub boss and a final match specific to each character.

Each final match is introduced by a real time cutscene with the two opponents, which differs from the Arcade Mode's unique dialogue between Yoko and Red Eye. The Arcade Mode's "Extra Stage", which is only available when beating Red Eye without using a continue, does not exist in the story mode. In this bonus stage, the ultimate opponent is a Dural-like metallic mute version of the player's own character. Depending on the version, this extra character is either a solid gray color or reflective. In the console versions, Red Eye is playable with his own story mode ending movie.

Winning the story mode's final stage unlocks a different ending anime sequence for each character, and each video is available for future viewing in the "Movie" mode. Prolific Japanese studio Telecom Animation Film (テレコム•アニメーション•フィルム) produced all ten videos, including the opening music sequence.

== Development ==
The arcade version was developed in Japan by the AM3 team that had developed Virtual On. According to director/project lead Akinobu Abe, "The game was designed to be quite realistic, with realistic style and people - Last Bronx characters wear clothes based on current Tokyo street fashions." While working on the game, the developers found that the weapons couldn't be seen during attacks because of how fast they were moving; this led to them programming the weapons to leave afterimages when in motion.

Environmental texture mapping, used to create the reflective effect of the "Metal" versions of the characters, is not a supported feature of the Model 2 hardware and had to be accomplished through programming trickery.

AM3 had a demo of the game ready in time for the AOU show in February 1996, but Sega would not allow them to show it because Sega AM2 was demonstrating several fighting games at the show and they feared another one would divide media and industry attention too much.

The Saturn version was developed by the same team which created the arcade original. They started work on the conversion on November 8, 1996. An early version of the Saturn conversion was exhibited at the Tokyo Game Show in April 1997, featuring four playable characters: Yusaku, Yoko, Tommy and Nagi. The demonstration was described as approximately 30 percent complete. Contemporary coverage reported that AM3 was reusing the arcade version's character models and animation data while adapting the lighting and graphical presentation to the Saturn hardware. Since they believed the fast weapons movement to be the key element to the game's appeal, they prioritized retaining all the animation data and the 60 frames per second frame rate of the arcade version. None of the development team had ever worked on a Saturn game before.

In an interview with Sega Saturn Magazine, director Akinobu Abe explained that the team hoped to make Last Bronx accessible to players who were unfamiliar with the arcade version, while retaining the characteristics of the original game. According to Abe the most difficult part was making the collision detection accurate, due to the greater amount of calculations attached to weapons than hand-to-hand combat. They found it impossible to recreate the environmental texture mapping on the "Metal" characters with the Saturn hardware.

Last Bronx includes advertising for real life brands such as Shott, Suzuki, Toyo Tires, AM Records, Java Tea, Axia, Wild Blue Yokohama (theme park) and JAL. Most of these advertising bills were removed or exchanged with Sega or Saturn logos, sometimes replaced by "Now Printing" bills, in the oversea releases. An "AAA Act Against AIDS" bill, which is a Japanese nonprofit annual event concert, was introduced in the subway stage of the 1998 Windows version.

== Releases ==
=== Saturn port ===
The Sega Saturn version of Last Bronx was released in Japan on August 1, 1997. The Tokyo Bangaichi subtitle appears only in the Japanese release. The logo's blood squirt was removed in overseas editions. Only the 2006 PlayStation 2 Sega Ages 2500 Series Vol.24 version uses the original Last Bronx: Tokyo Bangaichi title name and logo.

In an interview with Sega Magazin, director Akinobu Abe discussed how player feedback at the Tokyo Game Show influenced the development of the Sega Saturn conversion. After fans of the arcade version complained that the demonstration lacked the motion blur effects accompanying weapon movements, the developers decided to incorporate them. Abe explained that the team wanted the Saturn version to appeal to both experienced arcade players and newcomers. He also ruled out introducing an additional playable character, believing this could negatively affect the balance between the existing fighters. Instead, the developers planned to include novelty weapons, such as a frozen tuna for Zaimoku.

A movie (Toei Video) was dedicated to Last Bronx, with its own OST CD. Last Bronx was launched in summer 1997 with a blockbuster campaign. The Sega Saturn game box contains exclusive extras such as a "Special Disc" featuring two training modes, a vocal characters profile and an "Interactive Tutorial Mode" with extensive vocals. This bonus disc was never released overseas. This package also includes a 56-page illustrated color booklet, a dual-side collector poster featuring character art and a gameplay command list and a set of stickers. The Sega Saturn version is supplemented by extra game modes such as Survival, Time Attack and Saturn Mode. Three Club Remixes by Yoshiaki Ouchi were taken from the movie's OST and added in the game as unlockable BGM for the stages of Tommy, Lisa and Kurosawa.

=== PC port ===
In February 1998, Sega released a Windows version of Last Bronx, incorporating features from both the arcade and Sega Saturn versions. The conversion retained the Saturn's additional story mode while featuring improved graphics, including more detailed three-dimensional backgrounds, lighting and shadows that more closely resembled the arcade original.

The PC version introduced additional gameplay modes, including Team Battle and network multiplayer, alongside a revised training mode. The Saturn version's CPU-versus-CPU Watch Mode was removed, while additional graphical settings allowed players to adjust visual detail and frame rates.

=== PlayStation 2 10th anniversary ===
On June 29, 2006, Sega released Last Bronx for the PlayStation 2 in Japan as part of the Sega Ages 2500 series, commemorating the game's tenth anniversary. Unlike the earlier Sega Saturn and Windows ports, the PlayStation 2 version was designed to closely reproduce the original arcade release, including its graphics and gameplay mechanics.

The PlayStation 2 version includes Arcade, Versus, Survival, Time Attack and Replay modes, the latter allowing players to save and review matches from adjustable camera angles. Additional features include progressive scan support, adjustable frame rates, an archive containing over 100 pieces of artwork and development materials, and hidden options that alter character appearances and gameplay mechanics. These include modes featuring oversized heads or weapons, increased health and playable metallic characters. The game also features a hidden mode that recreates the original arcade presentation, including its startup sequence and coin-operated interface.

== Reception ==
Reception

Aggregate score
Aggregator	Score
GameRankings	71.70%

Review scores
Publication	Score
AllGame	3.5/5 (ARC); 3/5 (SAT)
Electronic Gaming Monthly	8.125/10 (SAT)
GameSpot	4/10 (SAT)
Next Generation	4/5 (ARC, SAT); 2/5 (PC)
MAN!AC	80/100 (SAT)
Joypad	84%
Sega Saturn Magazine	92% (SAT)

Last Bronx was already a hit and popular franchise in Japan before the home version's release, but it flopped in U.S. arcades, appearing in only a handful of venues in the country.

Next Generation reviewed the arcade version, describing it as "a grittier, and in some ways more inventive product than the sometimes overly smooth efforts of AM2." The reviewer also praised the subtle techniques, use of the same intuitive three-button configuration used on all Model 2 fighting games, challenging opponent A.I., fluid animation, and intense sound effects.

Assessments of the Saturn port's technical qualities were moderately positive, with praise for the smooth frame rate, high resolution, and motion trails left by weapons, but criticism for the glitching out of polygons. Sega Saturn Magazine said that the port has "some jaw-dropping visuals virtually indistinguishable from the coin-op original" while Next Generation attributed the compromises the port made as a sign that "developers are approaching the asymptotic side of [the] Saturn's graphics curve".

The design and gameplay received a broader range of opinions from reviewers. GameSpot, which gave Last Bronx a negative review, said its biggest problem is that it fails to differentiate itself from Sega's previous fighting games. However, most reviewers said that the brutal gang style of the fighters were enough to set it apart from its predecessors. Next Generation, for instance, commented that "Weapons-based combat with VF response transform matches from stately martial arts trials to short, nasty, and brutish struggles for survival. And, truthfully, it's kind of refreshing to be nasty and brutish." Both GamePro and Dan Hsu of Electronic Gaming Monthly criticized that the cheap techniques, including the ability to take out half a character's health with a single combo, make the matches excessively short and mindless. Hsu's co-reviewer Shawn Smith instead praised the fact that no skill is required to do well in the game, even when playing against fighting game masters. Another common criticism was that there are too few characters. Most reviewers concluded that Last Bronx is clearly inferior to the earlier Saturn fighting game Fighters Megamix, though Smith said Last Bronx was "easily my favorite Saturn fighter."

Next Generation reviewed the PC version of the game, stating that "It's too bad Sega dropped the ball because this coulda' been a contender."

== Adaptations and merchandise ==
In Japan, Last Bronx received several multimedia adaptations, including a live-action direct-to-video film, a manga serialised in Kadokawa's Fantasy DX, and a novelisation published in Shōsetsu Asuka. A radio drama was also broadcast on Bunka Hōsō, with a four-part CD series released between September and December 1997.
