= WPOA =

WPOA can refer to:

- Western Pacific Orthopaedic Association
- Weak phase object approximation in High-resolution transmission electron microscopy
- Water Park of America
