= Seagaia Ocean Dome =

Indoor waterpark in Miyazaki, Japan

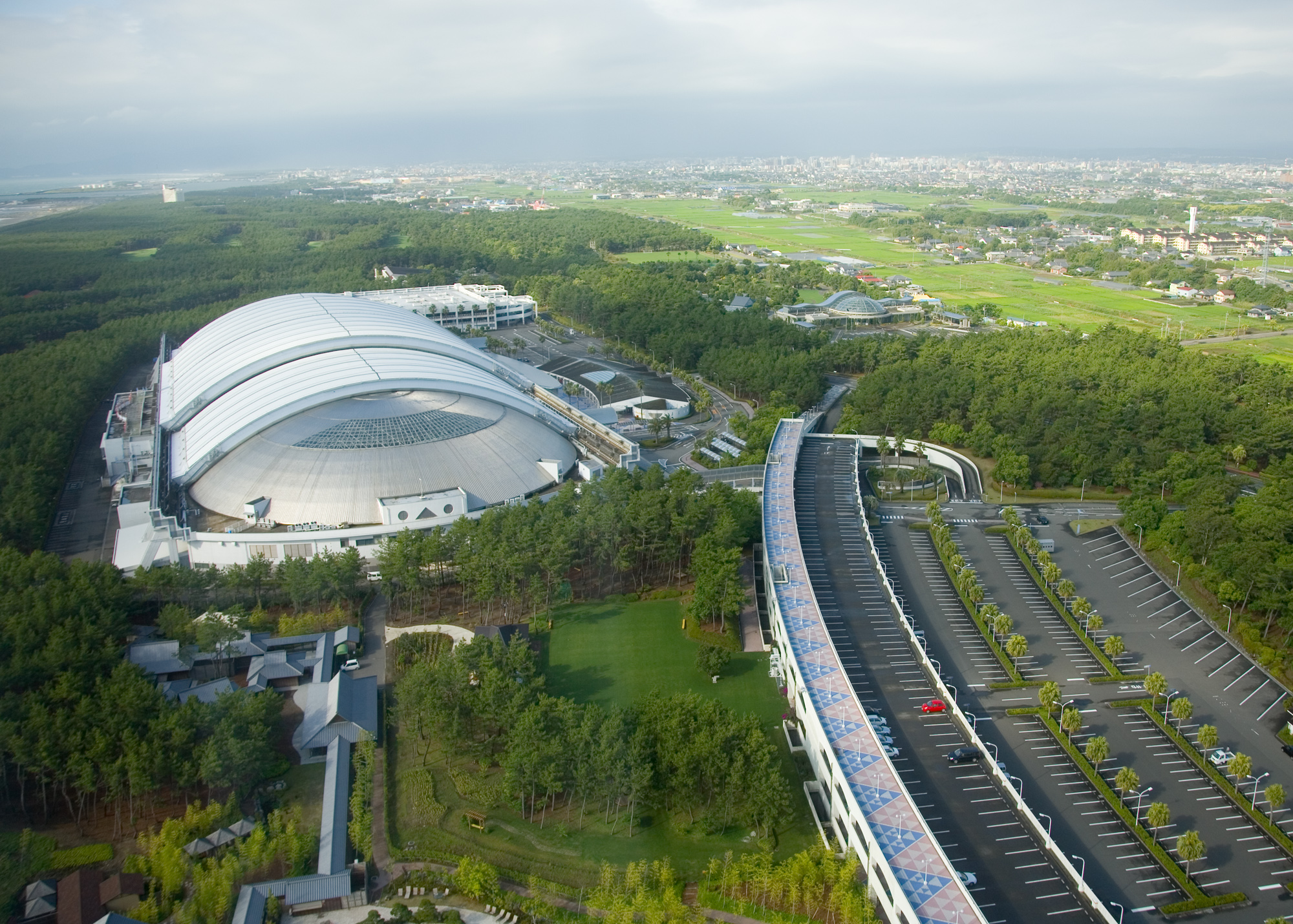
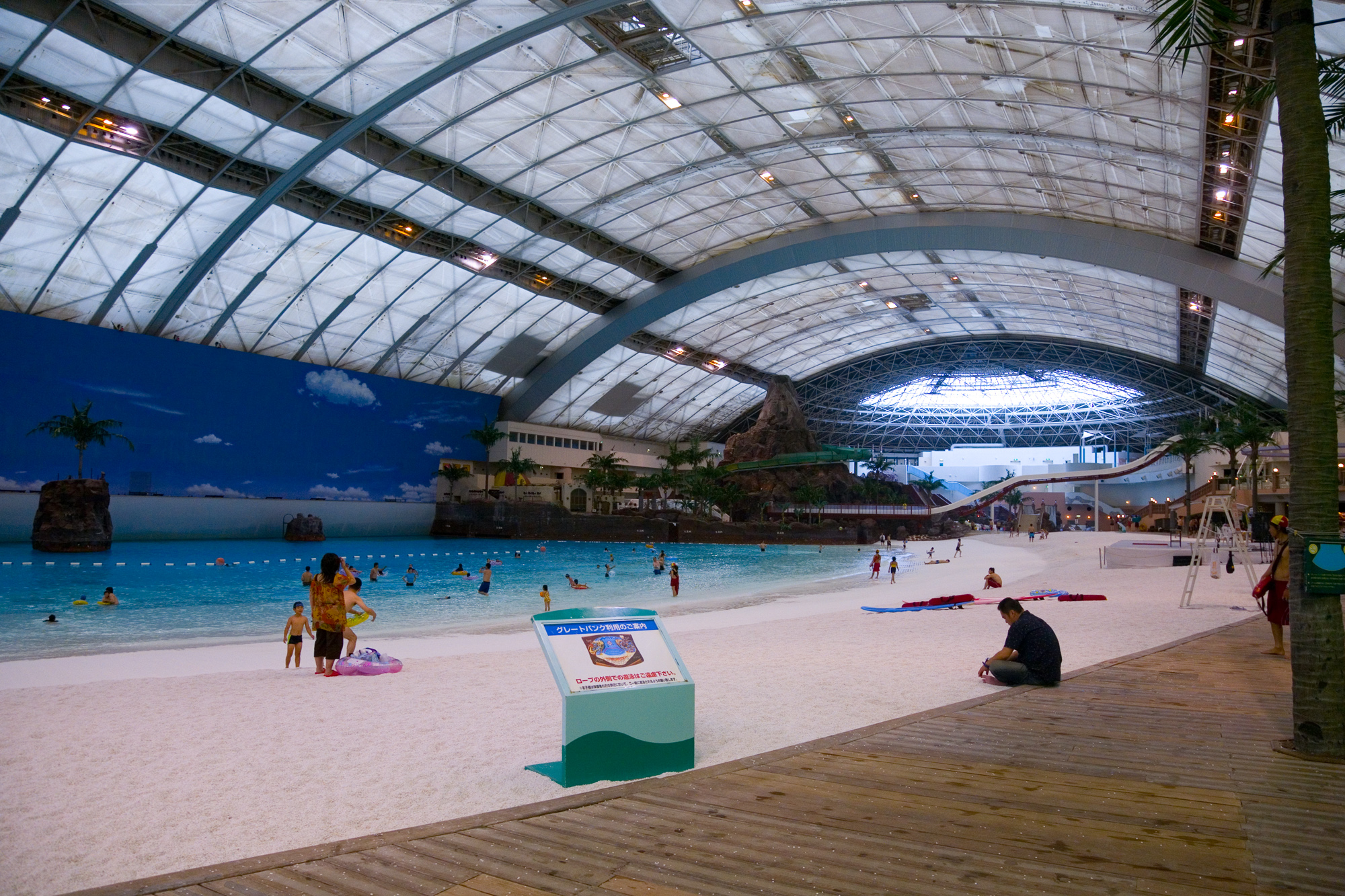
- Miyazaki Ocean Dome, surrounded by golf courses Miyazaki Ocean Dome, main pool
- Interactive map of Seagaia Ocean Dome
- Location: Miyazaki, Miyazaki, Japan
- Coordinates: 31.955112°N 131.469655°E

Construction
- Opened: July 30, 1993; 33 years ago
- Closed: October 1, 2007; 19 years ago
- Demolished: 2017
- Cost: cost ¥200 billion ($1.6 billion)

The Seagaia Ocean Dome (シーガイアオーシャンドーム, Shīgaia Ōshan Dōmu) was one of the world's largest indoor waterparks, located in Miyazaki, Japan.

== Layout ==
The Polynesia-themed Ocean Dome, which was part of the Sheraton Seagaia Resort, with the world's biggest retractable roof, which was opened and closed according to the weather conditions; 12,000 square metres of sandy beach, crushed from 600 tonnes of stones; an "ocean" six times larger than an Olympic pool, filled with 13,500 tonnes of unsalted, chlorinated water kept hot at 28 °C, equipped with a wave-machine with 200 variations, and listed in the Guinness World Records as the biggest simulated pool. A 340 hectares (840 acres) resort, it boasts five hotels, several golf-courses, a botanical park and a zoo.

== History ==
The Ocean Dome water park, which opened in 1993 along with the rest of the complex, was visited by 1.25 million people in the peak year of fiscal 1995. Other accommodations within the area include the Seaside Hotel Phoenix, the Sun Hotel Phoenix, and the Cottage Himuka, with 14 cottages in a wooded setting. Depending on the season, the entrance cost for the simulated dome was 2600 yen ($21.17) for an adult and 1600 yen ($13.03) for a child.

Seagaia filed for bankruptcy on February 19, 2001, being the biggest failure of public-private partnership in Japan and symbolized the excesses of Japan's bubble economy. The dome was later bought by Ripplewood, an American private-equity fund, in 2001 for 16.2 billion yen (US$148 million), which was less than 10% of its construction costs of 200 billion yen ($1.8 billion). Ripplewood had also invested an additional 3.5 billion yen ($32 million) on renovations for the dome; but even after the remodeling of the resort, the hotel closed down with liabilities of 276 million yen ($2.5 million).

The water park was closed in 2007 by Phoenix Resort K.K. The Seagaia Ocean dome was demolished in 2017, a year after the hotel had received major renovations which did not include the dome.

== Gallery ==
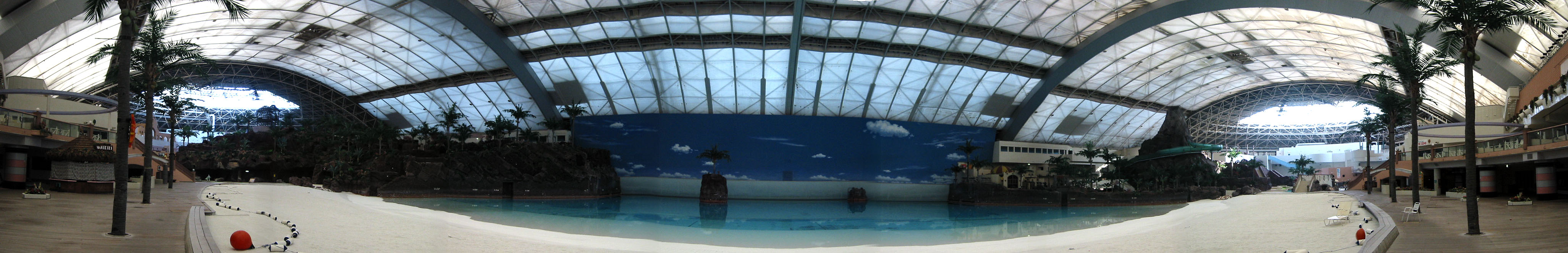
Panoramic view of the Seagaia Ocean Dome's interior

== Trivia ==
The Seagaia Ocean Dome was to make an appearance in the 1993 unmade James Bond movie Reunion With Death.

== See also ==
- International Garden Festival, similar dome structure
- List of water parks
