= Wet N Wild (North Shields) =

Former Indoor Water Park in North Shields, Tyne and Wear, England

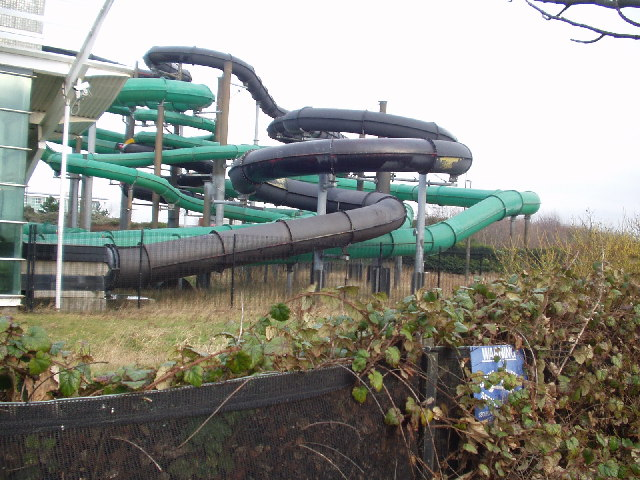
- Some of the slides at Wet N Wild travel outside of the complex
- Interactive map of Wet N Wild
- Location: Royal Quays, North Shields, Tyne and Wear, England
- Coordinates: 54.9960°N 1.4607°W
- Opened: 19 July 1993
- Closed: 2019

Wet N Wild was an indoor water park situated in North Shields, Tyne and Wear, England. It was the United Kingdom's largest indoor water park when opened by Diane Youdale (Jet) on 19 July 1993, a title subsequently claimed by Sandcastle Waterpark after its extension in the 2000s. The park was situated in the Royal Quays complex, and featured numerous slides, a wave machine, and rapids. The park finally shut in 2019, and remained abandoned until 2024. On 8 November 2024, demolition of the abandoned water park began.

== Slides and facilities ==
Wet N Wild had several large water slides, such as the Kamikaze, the UK's steepest water slide, which included an 80-foot drop, the Tornado which included two slides that snaked round each other on which you could race your friends. The Abyss, which included two large drops, the Black Hole, a double tire slide, and Calamity Canyon which included a number of small slides and whirlpools. All slides were supplied by Australian Waterslides and Leisure. The waterpark also had a small children's area, which was known as Discovery Island.

The Black Hole was a 2-person Tyre slide and it had been suggested that was the most recognised star attraction slide at Wet N Wild North Shields within its 27-year history, and at 165 metres long, was the largest water slide in the United Kingdom. There were also a number smaller slides at the park, and a lazy river was also an attraction. A small outdoor pool would be open during the summer, with picnic benches situated at the poolside. One of Wet N Wild's main selling points when it first opened was its controlled indoor climate, heated to a "tropical" 29 degrees Celsius. This meant that visitors could spend time out of the water, queueing for the slides or visiting the café, without noticing a drop in temperature. However, this was extremely costly, and the indoor climate feature was abandoned when the park reopened in 2014. Changing Room facilities were mainly situated below the café area and included over 300 lockers and over 20 changing room cubicles both single and double. Baby changing facilities were also available for parents. Food and drink was served at what was originally Crusoe's Galley Café (renamed Beach Hut Café in 2014) and was situated near the stairs to the pool and admission booth. The café served burgers, chips, crisps and chocolate bars, and drinks mainly included water, carbonated drinks, coffees and teas.

=== All flumes ===
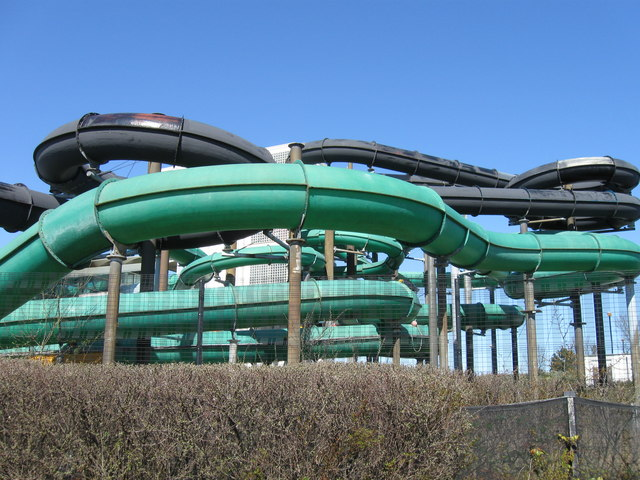
Flumes viewed from outside in 2010

Slow Speed Rides 1. The Tempest (Formerly known as "The Pinball"; opened in July 1993) 2. The Mistral (opened on 19 July 1993)

Medium Speed Rides 3. The Black Hole (opened in 1997) 4. The Calamity Canyon (opened on 19 July 1993) 5. The Hurricane (opened on 19 July 1993) 6. The Cyclone (opened on 19 July 1993)

Fast Speed Rides 7. The Kamikaze (opened in 1995) 8. The Tornado Racer (Formerly known as "The Tornado"; opened on 19 July 1993) 9. The Abyss (opened in June 2001)

Cancelled Secret Ride In 2012, A Space Bowl slide was ordered, however the construction did not happen. Project Space Bowl was allegedly planned, but the park never went through with the plan.

== History ==
=== Opening and early years ===
Wet N Wild opened to the public on 19 July 1993, and was the largest indoor waterpark in the United Kingdom at the time. The park was home to a 70ft (21.3m) flume tower. When the park originally opened there was even a bar known as Man Friday's Bar, which served cocktails and other alcoholic drinks. The water park proved to be increasingly popular to both residents of the North East, and further afield across the UK, which resulted in the addition of a new water slide The Kamikaze opening in 1995, followed by The Black Hole in 1997, and then The Abyss in June 2001.

=== 2013 closure ===
In its later years, Wet N Wild suffered financially, partially due to low visitor numbers due to its relatively costly entry fee, alongside the high costs to keep the park fully operational. In October 2013, Wet N Wild entered into administration, causing the park to shut its doors to the public.

=== 2014 reopening ===
On 4 August 2014, Wet N Wild was reopened, following a £1.1 million refurbishment by Moirai Capital Investments and Serco Leisure. The revamp included a new cafe, a new soft play area, and brand new family changing facilities and showers.

=== 2019 closure ===
In 2019, Serco Leisure announced that Wet N Wild would be closing once again, following a decline in visitors and increasing costs to keep the facility up to date and operational, which had led to reduced seasonal hours earlier in the year, although Serco Leisure did suggest that the park may reopen the following year. The park had been criticised by many visitors due to the slowly decaying state of the pool, which included cracked floor tiles, dirt on the changing room floor, and many lockers missing their doors.

=== Abandonment and demolition (2020–2024) ===
In February 2020, the park's lease holders, Serco Leisure, announced that the park would not reopen in that year. Later in 2020, having leased the park for six years, Serco Leisure bought the building outright, however the park never reopened. The site lay abandoned for several years and was victim to several break-ins and acts of vandalism, of which the local police were alerted to. Finally, beginning on 8 November 2024, what remained of the derelict Wet N Wild water park was demolished.
