= Sports World Izunagaoka =

Water park and resort in Shizuoka, Japan

Coordinates: 35.042°N 138.917°E

Sport World Izunagaoka

General information
- Status: Demolished
- Location: Shizuoka, Japan
- Opening: 1988
- Closed: 1996; 30 years ago

Sports World Izunagaoka was a water park and resort that operated in Shizuoka, Japan. It opened in 1988, but closed in 1996 after its owners went bankrupt. The resort then sat abandoned for nearly 15 years until its demolition in early 2010, leaving only a few buildings and the parking lot.

== See also ==
- List of water parks
