= Manteca Waterslides =

Defunct water park in California, United States

Coordinates: 37.7767°N 121.2884°W

The Manteca Waterslides was a water park that existed in the Central Valley town of Manteca, California from 1974 to 2004. Founded by R.H. "Budge" Brown, the park enjoyed status as one of the better waterparks in the United States and had easy access to Interstate 5 located at the Oakwood Lake Resort & R.V. Campground. It was familiar to central valley park-goers for its massive drop-down slide "V-Max".

In the summer of 2004, it was announced that the park would be closed. The owners of the park cited high workers' compensation and health care costs as reasons for the park's closure in September 2004.

As of April 2008, the site of the old waterpark lies underwater due to the expansion of Oakwood Lake and the surrounding land is being proposed for development which would provide housing for, among other people, commuters to the San Francisco Bay Area.

In 2010, there was talk of a developer buying the land bringing back the water park.

Manteca Waterslides was home to Oakwood Lake Amphitheatre, a venue primarily used for concerts.

== See also ==
- List of water parks
