= Splash Amarillo Waterpark =

Water park in Amarillo, Texas, United States

Coordinates: 35.194°N 101.770°W

- Interactive map of Splash Amarillo Waterpark
- Location: Amarillo, Texas, United States
- Opened: May 2000
- Closed: 2016
- Previous names: FireWater Waterpark
- Operating season: May through August
- Pools: 2 pools
- Water slides: 6 water slides
- Website: Official website

Splash Amarillo Waterpark was a waterpark located in Amarillo, Texas. It was originally built as FireWater Waterpark in May 2000. It sat on a 13-acre (53,000 m^{2}) site just half a mile down Interstate 40 from the Big Texan Steak Ranch. Attractions consisted of a 14,000-square-foot (1,300 m^{2}) wave pool, 845-foot (258 m) long lazy river, a tower housing six separate slides, kids pool, and kids play tower. It also features a gift shop, concession stand, volleyball courts, and an arcade. It closed in 2016, and all the slides were relocated to a new park in Plainview called Royal Splash Texas, which opened in 2017.

== History ==
=== Construction ===
Groundbreaking for the formerly named FireWater Waterpark began on May 7, 1999. It was constructed at a cost of $3.7 million on a 21-acre (85,000 m^{2}) site, but it itself would only cover 13 acres (53,000 m^{2}) of the complex. Missouri Valley Inc. of Amarillo was the general contractor of the project. The construction was completed well before the set opening date of May 6, 2000.

=== Bankruptcy ===
FireWater Waterpark came under scrutiny in 2002 after it failed to repay loans taken during the original construction of the park. While park president Gary Abramson claimed to be in the process of securing long-term financial backing for it, Satana Corporation sued it for $2.16 million. The suit claimed it signed a promissory note and that investors even ignored written payment demands sent directly to them. Eventually, it was forced into bankruptcy after Missouri Valley Inc. filed a bankruptcy petition. It was reopened in May 2003 under completely new management and ownership and renamed Splash Amarillo.

=== Fire ===
In July 2009, the park experienced a fire inside a building which houses lockers, dressing rooms, restrooms, a concession stand, and maintenance room. Over 200 park patrons were forced to evacuate after witnesses reported a water heater had caught on fire. The fire caused over $70,000 in damage after spreading from the first floor to the attic. Park president Paul Johnson claimed that the building was not insured. As of June 2011, it has been refurbished and is functioning again.

== See also ==
- List of water parks
