= Oakwood Lake Amphitheatre =

Coordinates: 37.775°N 121.234°W

Oakwood Lake Amphitheatre was an outdoor amphitheater located at the Manteca Waterslides resort in Manteca, California. Notable past performers include Steppenwolf, Dio, Night Ranger, Mr. Big, Winger, Don Williams and Y&T.
