= Fantaseas =

Former British waterpark business

Coordinates: 51.44736864000819°N 0.24225532545568942°E

Fantaseas was a chain of indoor waterparks situated in the United Kingdom that opened in the late 1980s, but due to various technical, and financial difficulties closed in the mid-nineties. The first was opened in Autumn 1989 on the outskirts of Dartford in Kent. The building contained six water slides, a lazy river, wave pool, an outdoor heated lagoon as well as a cafe and gaming video arcade. Visible on the skyline from the nearby M25 motorway the building dominated the local landscape and became quite an icon of the town.

A second opened in August 1990 in Chingford, London, and featured many of the same rides as the Dartford park, albeit in a different configuration. The Chingford park was considered by some to be 'tamer' than its Dartford counterpart, but still contained many of the same styles of water slides as its sister site.

In the summer of 1992, it was found the foundations of the Dartford site were inadequate to support the building. It's a common myth around the area that the sole reason the Dartford site was shut down was because of this issue, this is in fact untrue as the main reason was financial. Many considered the parks to be fads and typical of the grandiose get-rich-quick schemes of the time. In reality, the company encountered significant financial difficulties with a lack of attendance especially outside of the school holiday seasons. There were also several serious accidents at the Chingford park which tarnished the reputation of the company. This, coupled with high maintenance costs, built up debts of over £6 million in an eighteen-month period. Despite the Dartford site being fairly profitable for the company (including the planned repairs of its foundations) it still wasn't enough to save the waterpark and both sites were eventually shut down.

The Chingford site re-opened briefly as ‘Hydropark’ before closing permanently. The site laid derelict for a decade before Waltham Forest Council built a new indoor pool, Larkswood Leisure Centre, on the site, which is now shared with Nuffield Health Fitness & Wellbeing Gym.

The Dartford site also lay dormant for almost a decade, but remained in remarkable condition and was guarded by security with scheduled checks on the water pumps and other parts. Its fate was sealed in the early 2000s, when the buildings were demolished. The site was used as a refuse dump and became derelict, with plans to turn it into housing. The residential development of 156 homes was completed in 2016.

Because Fantaseas shut down in 1992, images were on film and as such pictures of the sites are very rare, however recently on Facebook and other image sites people have started to upload scans of the Dartford site including flyers and even some pictures of the site during construction. A brief clip from Thames News dating back to 1988 covers redevelopment plans for Dartford at the time and shows the original concept for the waterpark, it was somewhat larger with the building, slides and layout of the complex being quite different to the final product which would open a year later, at this point it was simply known as “Water World”.

== See also ==
- List of water parks
