= Indoor water park =

Water park inside a building

An indoor water park is a type of water park that is located inside a building. An indoor water park has the ability to stay open year-round, as it is not affected by weather conditions.

== History ==
Some of the first indoor water parks are Tikibad at Duinrell (The Netherlands, 1984), Nautiland located at Haguenau (France, 1984), the Aqua Mundo at Center Parc De Eemhof located at Zeewolde (The Netherlands, 1980) and Alpamare (Pfäffikon) (Switzerland, 1977).

In 1985 an indoor water park was open in Edmonton, Alberta, Canada at the West Edmonton Mall. It is called the World Waterpark and is over 200,000 sq ft (19,000 m^{2}). It was a success for the mall and remains as one of the largest indoor water parks in the world. In 1985 Aqualud opened in France. Another indoor water park in Europe was built in Blackpool in 1986. It is called the Sandcastle Water Park.

The first indoor water park in the United States known as the Polynesian Resort Hotel and Suites in the small tourist town of Wisconsin Dells, WI. The hotel opened in 1989 and the water park in 1994. It was built in an effort to make the Dells a year-round tourist destination, rather than just a summer one. Since then, the Great Wolf Lodge brand has expanded, with multiple locations in the U.S. and a single venue in Canada, at Niagara Falls. The DreamWorks Water Park is the United States' largest water park upon opening.

== Craze ==
Since the opening of the first park, the indoor water park business has become very popular, especially for Edmonton in Canada, and Wisconsin Dells in the U.S., which claims itself as the "Water Park Capital of the World". The Dells has over five water park resorts that have at least one water park bigger than 55,000 sq ft (5,100 m^{2}). This includes the Great Wolf Lodge, Kalahari (Wisconsin's Largest Indoor Water Park), Chula Vista Resort (Lost Rios), Wilderness Territory (Wild West, Klondike Kavern, Wild WaterDome), and the Hotel Rome at Mt. Olympus. Wisconsin has the most indoor water parks in one state. Other states in the U.S., especially in the midwest, are building more indoor water parks separate or to existing hotels so they can become a year-round destination. More water parks are also being built in Canada, Europe and Asia.

Using a large hangar intended for Cargolifter Zeppelins, Tropical Islands Resort near Berlin, Germany, is since 2004 the largest indoor water park in the world with an area of 66,000 m² (710,000 sq feet). As the hangar is 107 metres (351 feet) high, it is one of the largest buildings on Earth by volume at 5.5 million m³ (194 million ft³).

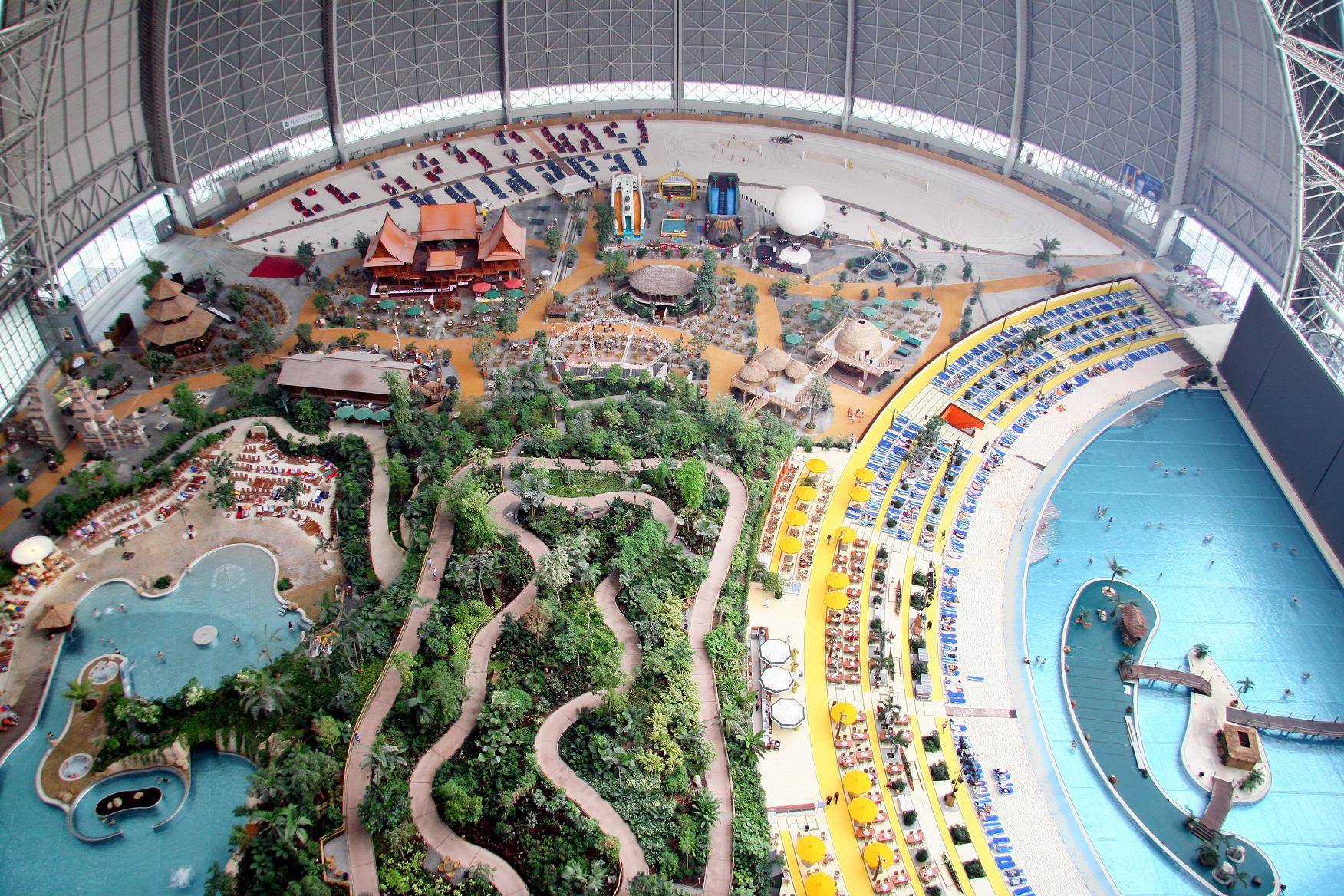
Tropical Islands Resort - inside

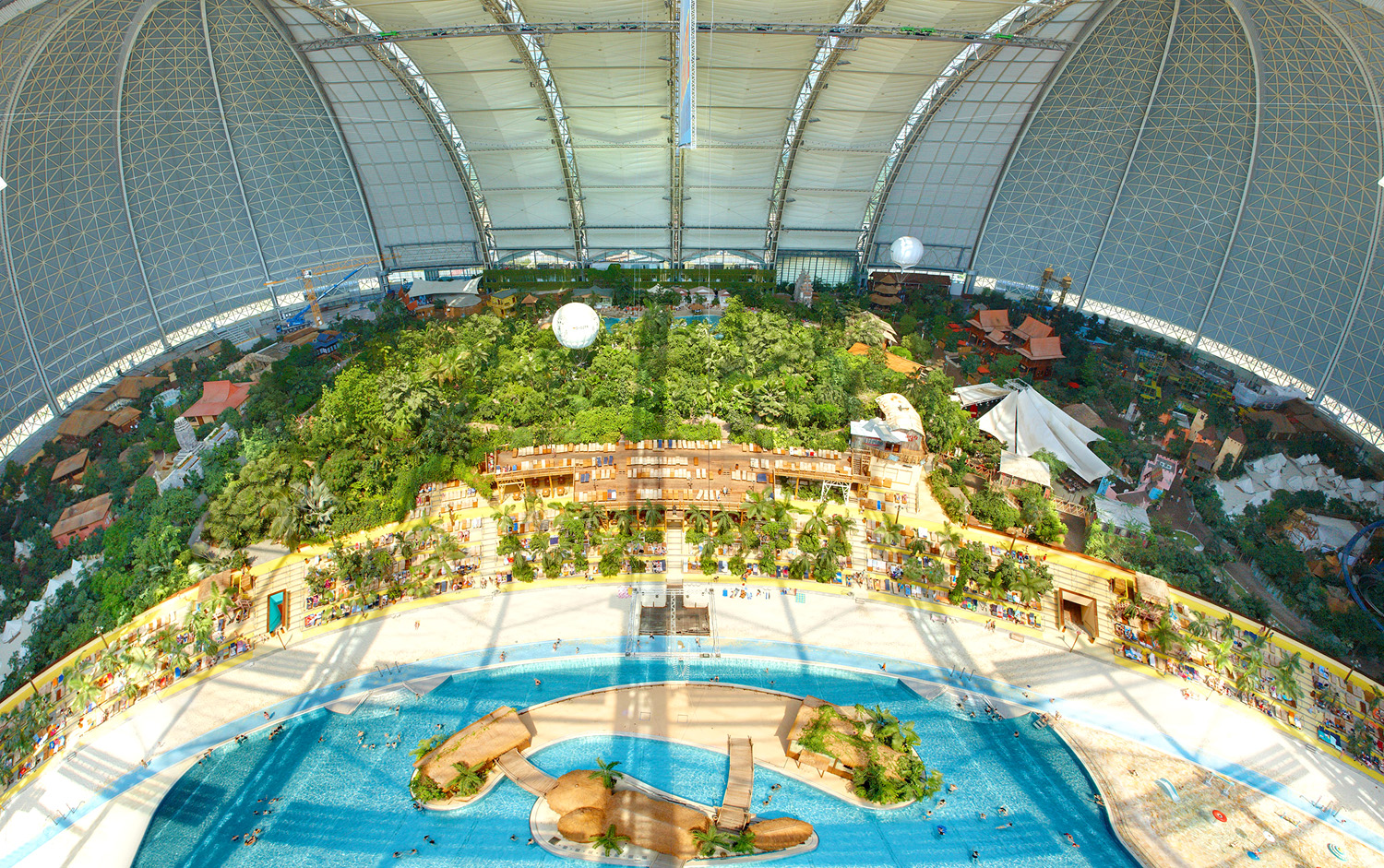
Tropical Islands Resort - inside, with the dome-shaped roof of the building visible

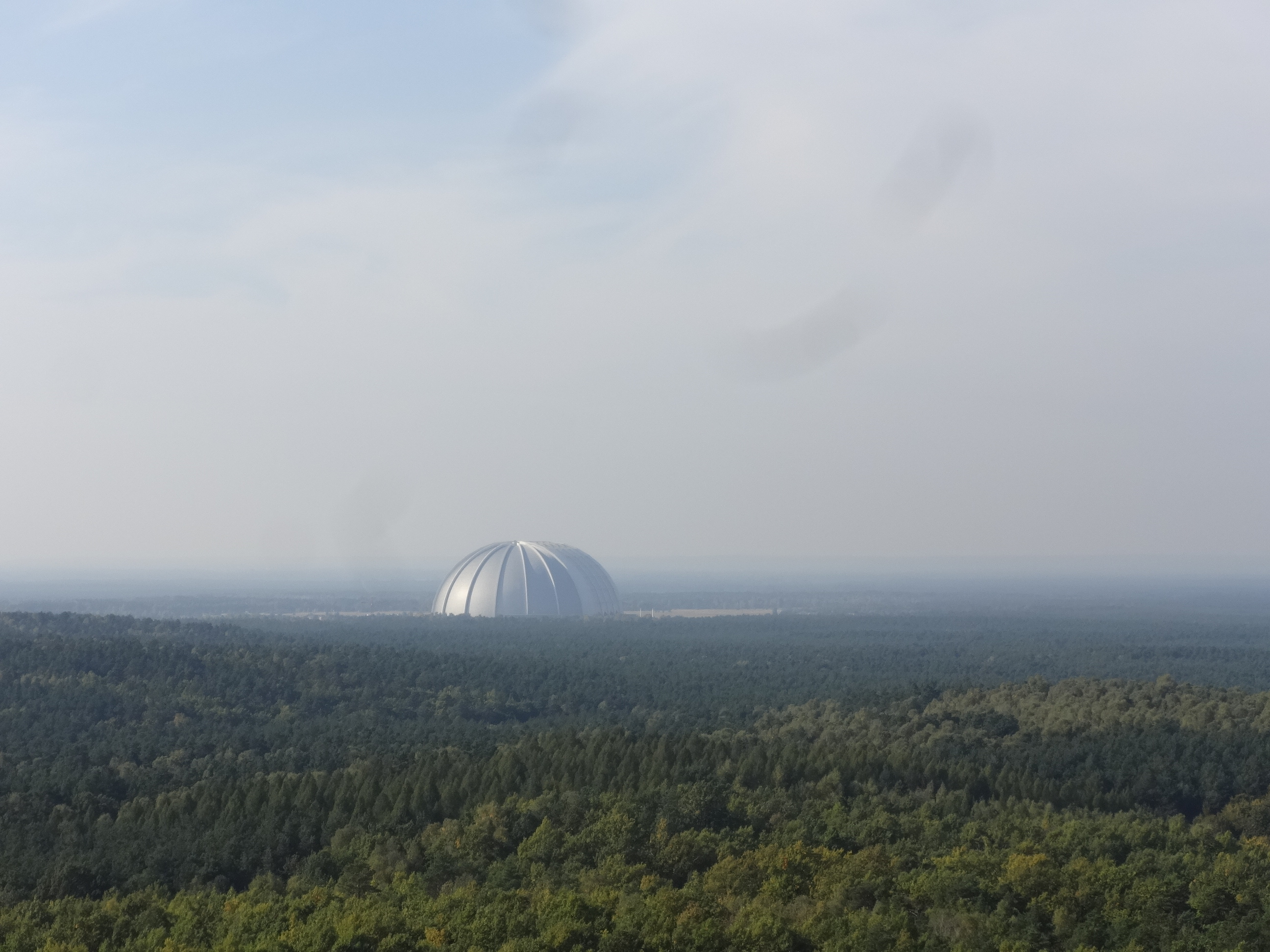
Tropical Islands Resort - outside

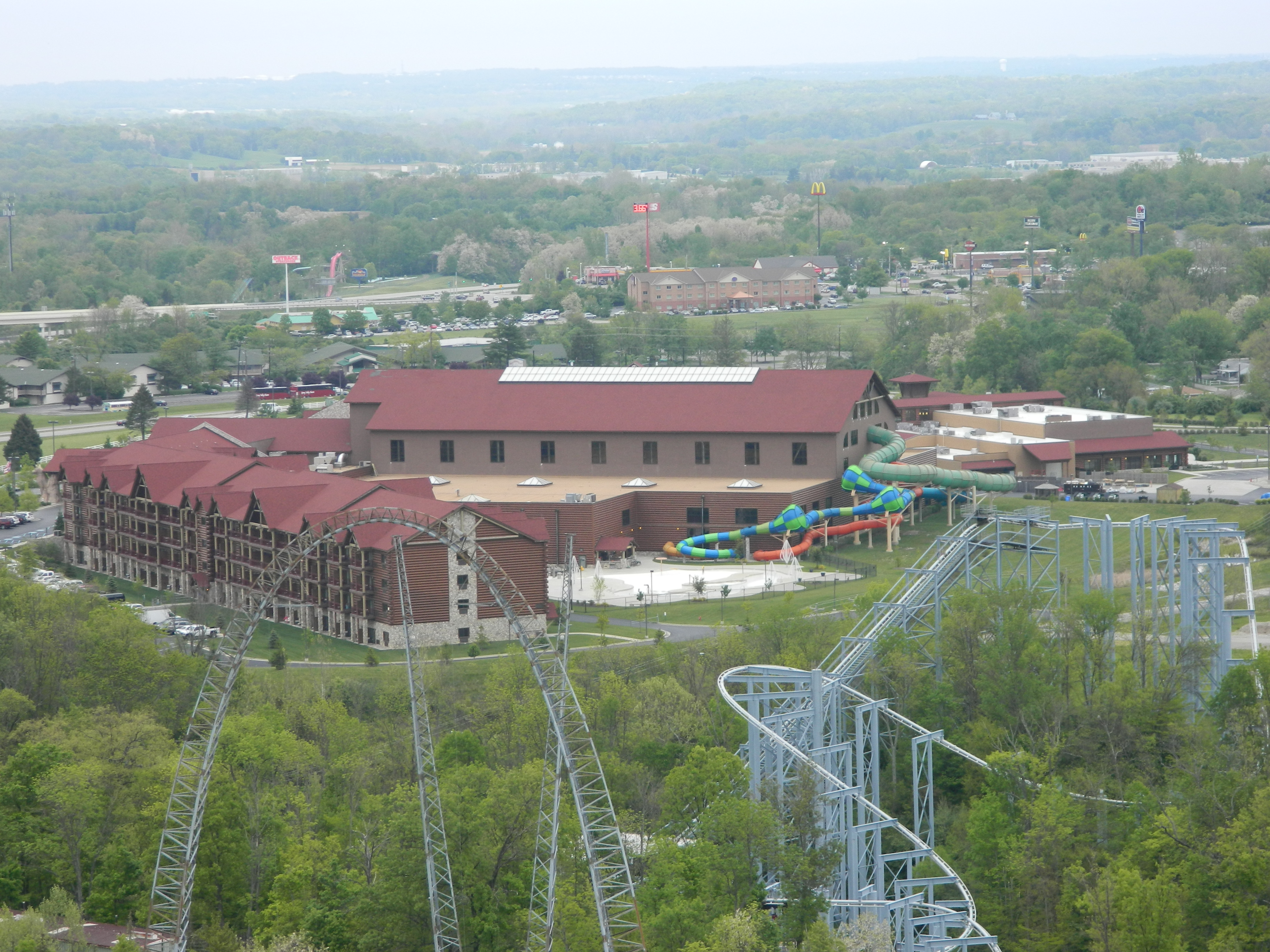
Great Wolf Lodge at Mason, Ohio

== Features ==
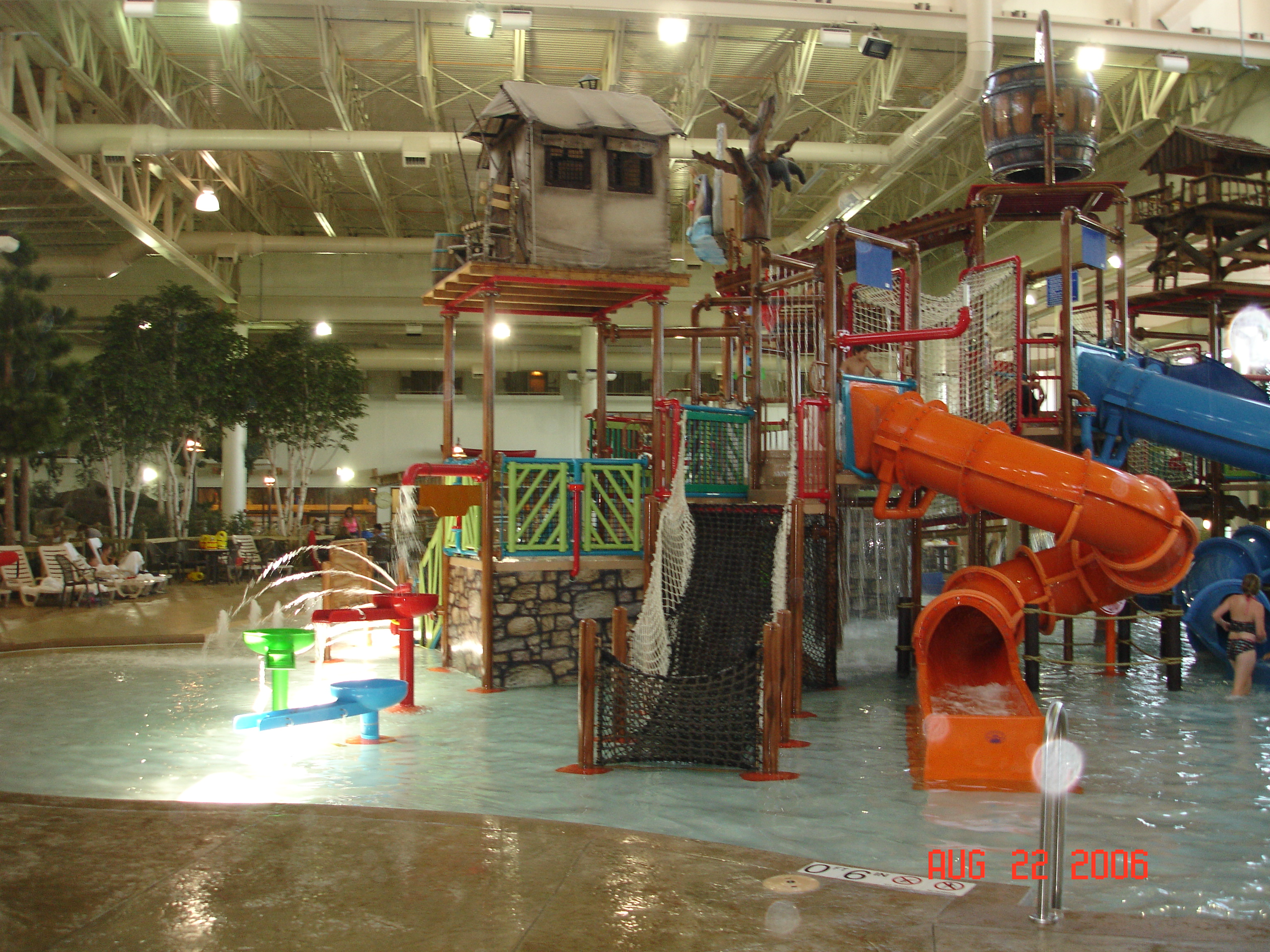
A view of the Children's Play Area at the now-defunct Water Park of America in Bloomington, Minnesota, which has since been purchased by Great Wolf Resorts and rebranded as a Great Wolf Lodge.

Most major indoor water parks have:

- Water slides
- Body slides
- Speed slides
- Children's Play Area with sprayers, tipping buckets, slides, and geysers. A typical example might be "Canada's Wonderland" "Pump House" attraction.
- Family rides (Ride that can occupy over 3 guests)
- Lazy rivers or torrent rivers
- Wave pool
- Water Coaster (Master Blaster)
- Other attractions (FlowRider, Mat Racing Slides, Tornado Vortex Ride, Pro Bowl/Behehmoth Bowl, etc.)

== See also ==
- List of waterparks
- Swimming pool § Indoor pools
