= Wild Blue Yokohama =

Indoor pool complex in Yokohama, Japan

Coordinates: 35°30′28″N 139°41′39″E

Wild Blue Yokohama was a large indoor pool complex located in Tsurumi-ku, Yokohama, Japan. The facility was operated by NKK Corp., a major Japanese steelmaker.

Located on a former baseball ground owned by NKK and spanning 30,000 square meters, the complex began constructions in September 1990 and opened in June 1992, costing ¥ 20 billion.

It closed on 31 August 2001 due to falling visitor numbers.

The complex contained an artificial rubber beach, decorated in a tropical theme, featuring artificially generated waves, heat lamps, and tanning booths.

== See also ==
- List of water parks
