= Great Wolf Resorts =

Chain of indoor water parks

Great Wolf Resorts, Inc.
- Type: Joint venture
- Traded as: Nasdaq: WOLF
- Industry: Hospitality
- Predecessor: Great Bear Lodge (Sandusky, OH), Black Wolf Lodge (Wisconsin Dells, WI)
- Founded: May 1997; 29 years ago, in Lake Delton, Wisconsin, United States
- Founder: Jack and Andrew Waterman
- Headquarters: Chicago, Illinois, United States
- Number of locations: 23 (with two under construction and seven under consideration)
- Area served: United States, Canada, and United Kingdom
- Key people: John Murphy (CEO)
- Services: Family Waterpark Resorts
- Owner: Centerbridge Partners; Blackstone Group
- Number of employees: 6,000
- Website: www.greatwolf.com

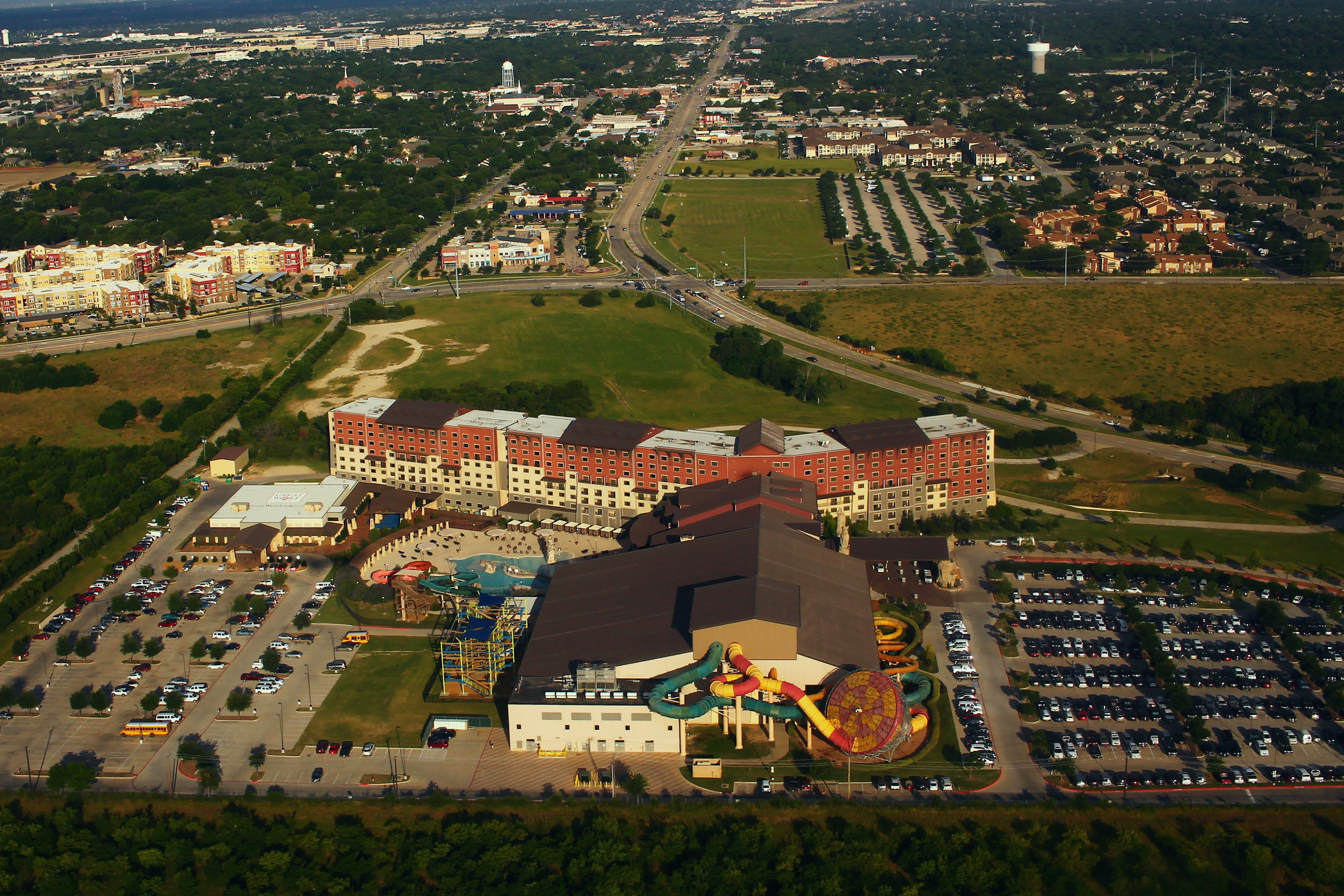
Great Wolf Lodge in Dallas, Texas

Great Wolf Resorts, Inc. is an American company which owns and operates the Great Wolf Lodge chain of family resort hotels and indoor water parks. In addition to a water park, each resort features restaurants, arcades, spas, and children's activities. Great Wolf Resorts is headquartered in Chicago, Illinois.

== History ==
Great Wolf Lodge began as a small indoor water park resort called Black Wolf Lodge which was founded in 1997 by brothers Jack and Andrew "Turk" Waterman, the original owners of Noah's Ark Water Park in Wisconsin Dells, Wisconsin. Black Wolf Lodge was purchased by The Great Lakes Companies Inc. in 1999. In 2000, president and founder, Craig A. Stark, and the team changed the name to Great Wolf Lodge and the company headquarters were established in Madison, Wisconsin. In 2001, the company built a second location in Sandusky, Ohio, and named it Great Bear Lodge. When a third location opened in 2003, the decision was made to place all future parks under the Great Wolf Lodge banner. The name of the Ohio location was changed to Great Wolf Lodge in 2004. The chain has since added nineteen additional locations and has one under construction.

On May 1, 2012, Great Wolf Resorts announced it was adding a new amenity or attraction to each of the resorts in time for the summer season. In addition, the company spent more than $4 million renovating the company's first two locations – Wisconsin Dells and Sandusky.

In April 2017, Great Wolf Resorts relocated its corporate headquarters to Chicago, Illinois.

=== Apollo acquisition ===
On March 13, 2012, Apollo Global Management announced an agreement to acquire the company for $703 million. Following the announcement, an investor group filed a complaint in Delaware Chancery Court stating that the deal, in which Apollo would pay $5 a share, undervalued the company. On April 12, 2012, KSL Capital Partners made an unsolicited offer of $6.25 a share, and Apollo followed suit raising its bid to $6.75 a share. KSL then raised its cash offer to $7 a share on April 8, 2012, beginning a rare public bidding war. After Apollo upped its offer again to $7.85 a share on April 20, 2012, KSL Capital Partners later announced it would not be making additional offers. The company's shares traded as low as $2.18 in October 2011, but climbed above $5 following the announcement in March 2012 and reached a 52-week high of $7.50 during trading in April 2012. Following Apollo's leveraged buyout, Great Wolf's stock was delisted from NASDAQ after the close of market, May 4, 2012. It is no longer a publicly traded company.

=== Centerbridge acquisition ===
On March 24, 2015, Centerbridge Partners reached an agreement with Apollo to acquire the Great Wolf chain for $1.35 billion. The acquisition was finalized on May 12, 2015.

=== Blackstone and Centerbridge joint venture ===
In September 2019, Blackstone Group made a deal to purchase 65% controlling interest in Great Wolf Resorts from Centerbridge Partners. The two firms agreed to form a $2.9 billion joint venture to own the company.

== Properties ==
Map of Great Wolf Lodge locations

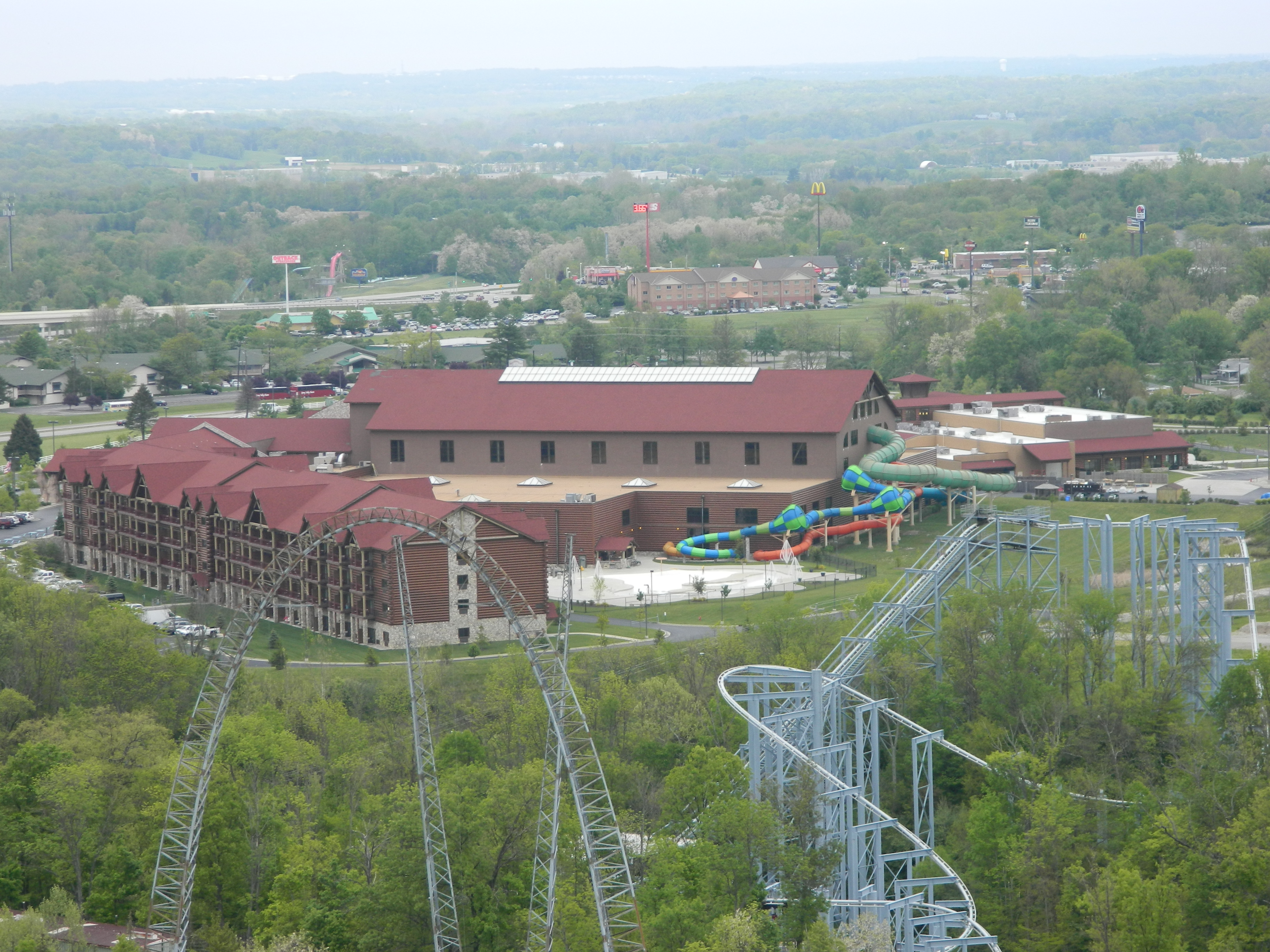
Great Wolf Lodge location in Mason, Ohio, next to Kings Island

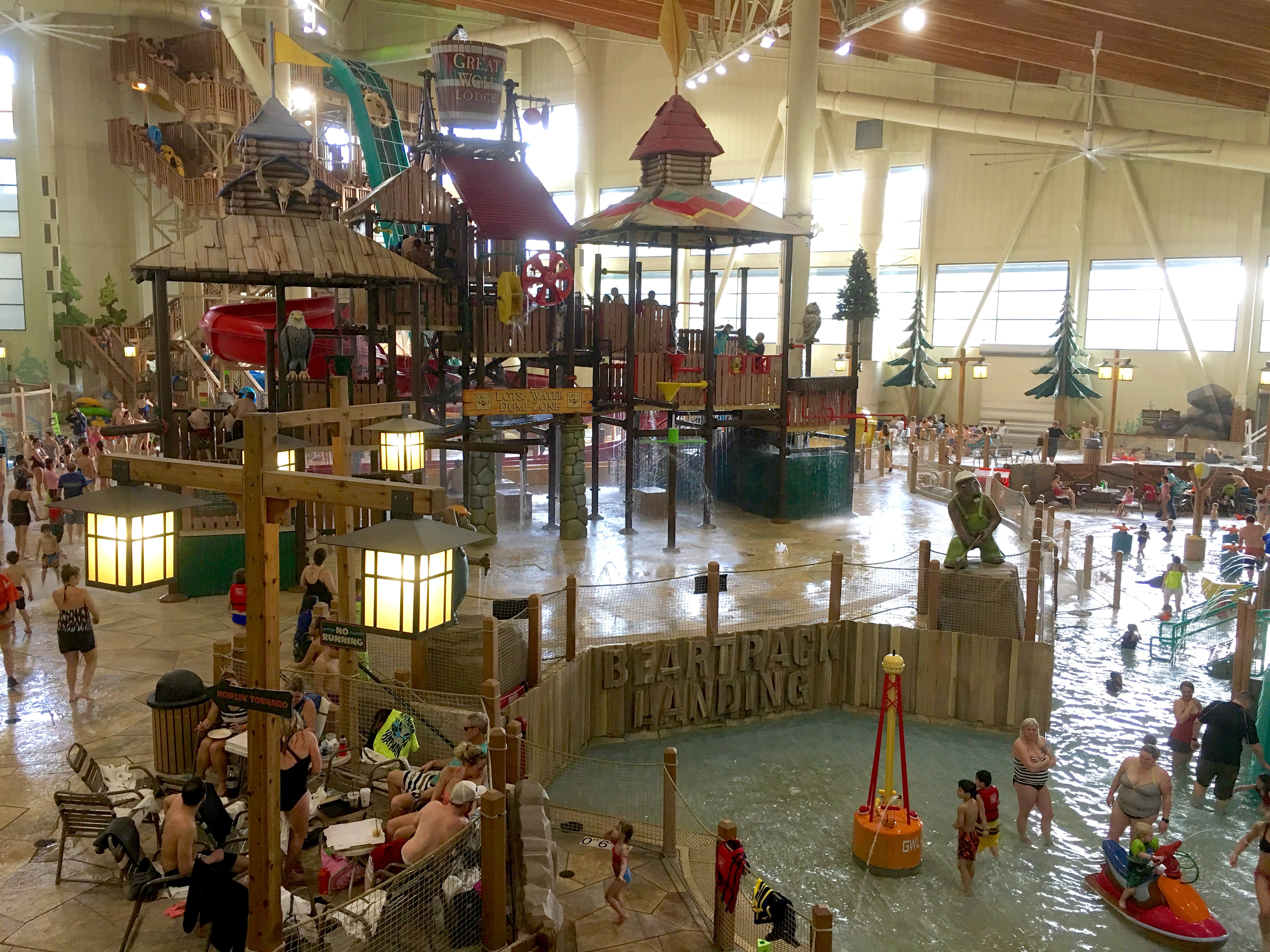
Interior of the waterpark at the Great Wolf Lodge in Grand Mound, Washington

Great Wolf Lodge locations:

Location	Year Opened
Lake Delton, Wisconsin	1997
Sandusky, Ohio	2001
Traverse City, Michigan	2003
Kansas City, Kansas	2003
Williamsburg, Virginia	2005
Pocono Township, Pennsylvania	2005
Niagara Falls, Ontario	2006
Mason, Ohio	2006
Grapevine, Texas	2007
Grand Mound, Washington	2008
Concord, North Carolina	2009
Fitchburg, Massachusetts	2014
Garden Grove, California	2016
Colorado Springs, Colorado	2016
Bloomington, Minnesota	2017
LaGrange, Georgia	2018
Gurnee, Illinois	2018
Salt River, Arizona	2019
Manteca, California	2021
Perryville, Maryland	2023
Webster, Texas	2024
Naples, Florida	2024
Mashantucket, Connecticut	2025

Previous locations:

- Sheboygan, Wisconsin (2004–2011 as operator of Blue Harbor Resort; never carried any Great Wolf Lodge branding)

Locations under construction:

- Bicester, Oxfordshire - A proposal to build a Great Wolf Lodge location in Chesterton near Bicester, Oxfordshire was submitted in 2019. The proposal was accepted by planning inspectors in 2021. Work on remodelling the plot of land acquired for the site began on December 30, 2021, with construction of the location itself beginning in 2022.
- Jackson, Tennessee

Locations under consideration:

- Squamish, British Columbia
- Little Egg Harbor, New Jersey
- Chester, New York
- Pompano Beach, Florida
- Cornwall, Ontario
- Basingstoke, Hampshire
- Bolsover, Derbyshire

The corporate headquarters, the "Great Wolf Den," is at 350 North Orleans, in River North, in the Near North Side, Chicago. The facility, the "Great Wolf Den," began operations in 2017. Previously, the headquarters were in Madison, Wisconsin. According to the company, the headquarters move occurred so the company could be closer to various sites of business operation. Rahm Emanuel, Mayor of Chicago, attended the ribbon cutting of the facility.

== Other brands ==
Great Wolf Lodge also owns MagiQuest.

== In other media ==
Great Wolf's previous CEO Kim Schaefer was featured in the U.S. version of TV's Undercover Boss, which included visits to several lodges where she worked alongside a lifeguard supervisor, front desk clerk, and restaurant waitstaff as well as participated in the children's program.

Great Wolf Entertainment and 6 Point Harness produced an animated film, called The Great Wolf Pack: A Call to Adventure, which premiered at Great Wolf Resorts on Labor Day, September 5, 2022. The film, directed by former Disney animator Chris Bailey (Runaway Brain), follows the adventure of five newly redesigned versions of mascot characters Wiley Wolf, Violet Wolf, Oliver Raccoon, Brinley Bear and Sammy Squirrel.

== Notes ==
1.The project was announced in December 2015 and there has been no new information on the project since 2018.
