= Lazy river =

Water park ride

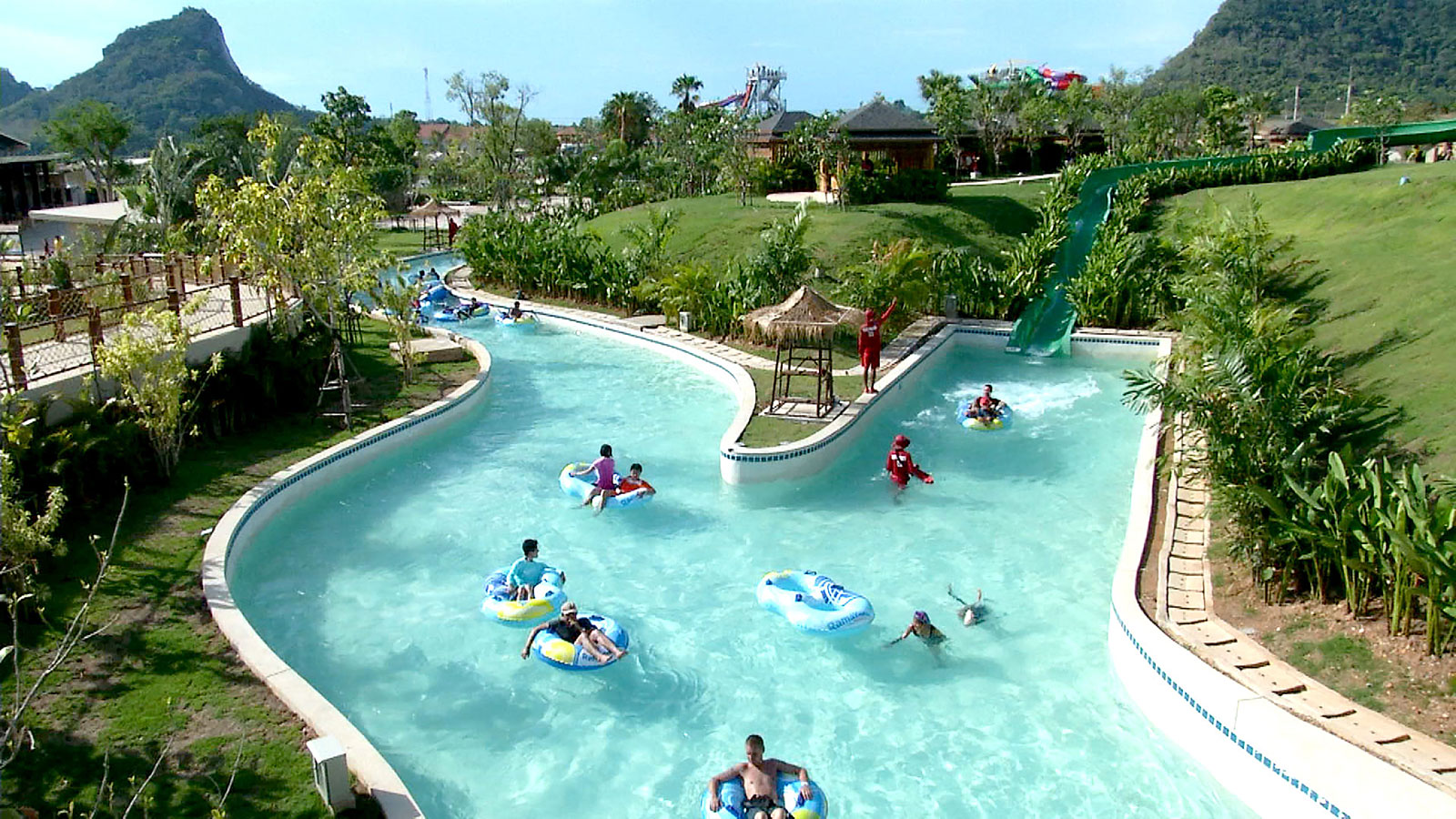
The lazy wave river at Ramayana Water Park in Pattaya, Thailand

A lazy river is a water ride found in water parks, hotels, resorts, and recreation centers, which usually consists of a shallow (2.5–3.5-foot (0.76–1.07 m)) pool that flows similarly to a river. There is generally a slow current, usually just enough to allow guests to gently ride along lying on rafts. The current is generated by a pumping mechanism that allows for the river to continue flowing indefinitely. There may also be scenic elements added, such as small waterfalls on the edge of the river. Some connect or lead into swimming pools or wave pools, while others are self-contained courses that simply complete a circuit.

A torrent river, or wave river, is a related concept. Torrent rivers feature wave machines similar to those that are in wave pools; the waves then push riders (who are on rafts, as they are in a regular lazy river) around the river faster than they would be traveling in a regular lazy river. Torrent rivers appear at all of the Schlitterbahn water parks and Aquaventure in Dubai and the Bahamas.

A current channel is another water feature found in aquatic facilities that uses moving water for enjoyment. A current channel usually consists of water 3–5 feet (0.91–1.52 m) deep and the width of the channel is no greater than 10 feet (3.0 m). Water flows similarly to a lazy river but because of the depth can be used for aquatic therapy and swimming or walking against the current.
