= Wonderland =

Wonderland may refer to:

== Places ==
=== Roads, streets, and trails ===
- Wonderland Avenue, a roadway in Laurel Canyon, Los Angeles and the site of the 1981 Wonderland Murders (at 8763 Wonderland Avenue)
- Wonderland Trail, a hiking trail that circumnavigates Mount Rainier in Mount Rainier National Park, Washington, U.S.
- Wonderland Road, a major north–south roadway in the city of London, Ontario, Canada

=== Other places ===
- Wonderland (Columbus, Ohio), a ghost town in Columbus, Ohio, U.S.
- Wonderland Greyhound Park, a former greyhound racing track in Revere, Massachusetts
- Wonderland station, a rapid transit station on the MBTA's Blue Line in Revere, Massachusetts, U.S.
- Wonderland Village, a shopping center in Livonia, Michigan, U.S.; formerly known as Wonderland Mall and Wonderland Center

== Amusement parks ==
- Canada's Wonderland, in Vaughan, Ontario, Canada
- Dutch Wonderland, near Lancaster, Pennsylvania
- Wonderland Amusement Park (disambiguation)
- Wonderland Amusement Park (Beijing) (沃德兰游乐园), an unfinished park in China
- Gillians Wonderland Pier, in Ocean City, New Jersey
- Wonderland Amusement Park (Indianapolis), in Indianapolis, Indiana
- Wonderland Amusement Park (Minneapolis), in Minneapolis, Minnesota
- Wonderland Amusement Park (Massachusetts), in Revere, Massachusetts
- Wonderland City, in Sydney, Australia, closed in 1911
- Wonderland Park (Texas), in Amarillo, Texas
- Wonderland Sydney, in Sydney, Australia, closed in 2004

== Arts, media and entertainment ==
=== Film ===
- Wonderland (1931 film), a short film
- The Fruit Machine (1988 film), known as Wonderland in the US, directed by Philip Saville
- Wonderland (1997 film), a satirical documentary directed by John O'Hagan
- Wonderland (1999 film), a British drama directed by Michael Winterbottom
  - Wonderland (soundtrack), an album by Michael Nyman and the soundtrack to the 1999 film
- Wonderland (2003 film), about the Wonderland Murders (see below), directed by James Cox
- Wonderland (2013 film), an Israeli comic thriller
- Wonderland (2023 film), a Singaporean drama
- The Wonderland, or Birthday Wonderland, a 2019 Japanese animated film
- Wonderland (2024 film), a South Korean sci-fi fantasy film

=== Games ===
- Wonderland (adventure game), a 1990 text-driven adventure by Magnetic Scrolls
- Wonderland Online, an MMORPG developed by Chinese Gamer International and published by Internet Gaming Gate (IGG)

=== Literature ===
- Wonderland (fictional country), the setting in 1865 children's novel Alice's Adventures in Wonderland by Lewis Carroll
- Wonderland (novel), 1971, by Joyce Carol Oates
- Wonderland (novella), a 2003 novel based on the television series
- Wonderland, a 2003 novel by Marinko Koščec

=== Music ===
==== Artists ====
- Wonderland (band), a girl band
- Wonderland, a German band featuring Achim Reichel, Frank Dostal and Les Humphries

==== Albums ====
- Wonderland (Steve Aoki album)
- Wonderland (Benny Carter album)
- Wonderland (Erasure album)
- Wonderland (Forgive Durden album)
- Wonderland (EP), by Jessica Jung
- Wonderland (McFly album)
- Wonderland (Sarah McLachlan album)
- Wonderland (Noosa album)
- Wonderland (Nosferatu album)
- Wonderland (Sea of Treachery album)
- Wonderland (Faryl Smith album)
- Wonderland (The Charlatans album)
- Wonderland (Take That album)
- Wonderland (Stanley Turrentine album)
- Wonderland (Judie Tzuke album)
- Wonderland (Wonderland album) by the girl band by the same name
- Wonderland (Khalil Fong album)
- Wonderland, a 2007 album by Rubikon
- Wonderland, a 2024 album by Holly Macve
- Wonderland, a 2007 extended-play by Pogo

==== Songs ====
- "Wonderland" (Alcazar song)
- "Wonderland" (AleXa song), 2022
- "Wonderland" (Big Country song), 1984
- "Wonderland" (Heidi Klum song)
- "Wonderland" (Kesha song), 2012
- "Wonderland" (Natalia Kills song)
- "Wonderland" (XTC song)
- "Wonderland" (Taylor Swift song), 2015
- "Wonderland", by 24Herbs feat. Janice Vidal, 2011
- "Wonderland", by Ateez from Treasure EP.Fin: All to Action
- "Wonderland", by Ayumi Hamasaki from My Story
- "Wonderland", by Band-Maid from Conqueror
- "Wonderland", by Caravan Palace from <|°_°|>
- "Wonderland", by Chvrches from Love Is Dead
- "Wonderland", by the Commodores from Midnight Magic
- "Wonderland", by Crazy Frog from Crazy Hits
- "Wonderland", by Eme 15 from Eme 15
- "Wonderland", by Koshi Inaba from Peace of Mind
- "Wonderland", by Loudness from Sunburst
- "Wonderland", by Michael Franks from Objects of Desire
- "Wonderland", by Passion Fruit
- "Wonderland", by Simply Red from Stars
- "Wonderland", by Tak Matsumoto Group from TMG I

==== Musicals ====
- Wonderland (musical), 2009, by Frank Wildhorn
- Wonder.land, a 2015 musical by Damon Albarn
- Wonderland, a rave in the off-Broadway musical Bare, a Pop Opera

=== Television ===
- Once Upon a Time in Wonderland (TV Series), a 2013 spinoff of the ABC television series Once Upon a Time
- Wonderland (Australian TV series), a 2013 Australian television drama series
- Wonderland (American TV series), a 2000 American television drama directed by Peter Berg that aired on ABC
- Wonderland, an alternate dimension in the Final Fantasy: Unlimited anime, to which the main characters travel
- Wonderland, a 2016 live music program on MTV
- Wonderland, a 2018 BBC short film in the BBC One 'Oneness' series of station idents
- The Wonderland, a fictional band in the CBBC series Almost Never
- "Wonderland" (3D Animated Web Series)

=== Other arts and media ===
- Wonderland (event), a club night concept created and developed by UK-based DJ Pete Tong
- Wonderland (magazine), a British lifestyle and fashion magazine

== Other uses ==
- Open Wonderland, an open source toolkit for building 3D virtual worlds
- Wonderland Club, an international child pornography ring operating over the Internet
- Wonderland model, a mathematical model used for studying issues in sustainable development
- Wonderland murders, four unsolved killings that occurred at 8763 Wonderland Avenue in Los Angeles on July 1, 1981
- Children's Wonderland, meaning either the exhibit or the company
- Wonderland Sound and Vision, an American production company founded by Joseph McGinty Nichol

== See also ==
- Winterland (disambiguation)
- Wonderworld (disambiguation)
- Wonder (disambiguation)
- Alice in Wonderland (disambiguation)
