= Noosa (disambiguation) =

Noosa may refer to:

== Places ==
- The Shire of Noosa in Queensland, Australia
  - Noosa River
  - Noosa Heads
  - Noosaville
  - Noosa National Park
  - Noosa Biosphere Reserve
  - Electoral district of Noosa

== Music ==
- Noosa (artist)

== Festivals ==
- Noosa Festival of Surfing
