= Wonderworld =

Wonderworld may refer to:

- Wonderworld (musical), a musical production staged at the 1964 New York World's Fair
- Wonderworld (album), a 1974 album by Uriah Heep
- Simon Townsend's Wonder World, an Australian children's television show
- Wonder World (Texas), a real-life amusement park at Wonder Cave in San Marcos, Texas
- Wonder World Tour (disambiguation), multiple music tours
- Wonder World (album), an album by the Wonder Girls

== More ==
- Wonderland (disambiguation)
