= Adventures in Wonderland =

Adventures in Wonderland may refer to:

- Alice's Adventures in Wonderland, 1865 English children's novel by Lewis Carroll
- Adventures in Wonderland (1992 TV series), 1992–1995 American live-action/puppet musical television series based on the Alice's Adventures in Wonderland novels
- Alice's Adventures in Wonderland (ballet), ballet in three acts by Christopher Wheeldon with a scenario by Nicholas Wright, based on Alice's Adventures in Wonderland...
- The Care Bears Adventure in Wonderland, 1987 animated musical fantasy film
- Adventures in Wonderland (EP), 2018 album by South Korean band A.C.E

== See also ==
- Alice in Wonderland (disambiguation)
- Wonderland (disambiguation)
