= Wonderland Amusement Park =

Wonderland Amusement Park (usually simply named Wonderland) may refer to:

- Canada's Wonderland, Vaughan, Canada
- Dutch Wonderland, Lancaster, Pennsylvania
- Wonderland Amusement Park (Beijing) (沃德兰游乐园), an unfinished park in China
- Wonderland Amusement Park (Indianapolis)
- Wonderland Amusement Park (Kansas), former park (1905–1918) in Wichita
- Wonderland Amusement Park (Massachusetts), park that is the current site of Wonderland Greyhound Park
- Wonderland Amusement Park (Minneapolis)
- Wonderland Amusement Park (San Diego), former park (1913–1916) in the Ocean Beach neighborhood of San Diego
- Wonderland Park (Texas), Amarillo, Texas
- Wonderland City, Sydney, Australia
- Wonderland Sydney, Sydney, Australia
