= Wonderland of Rocks =

Wonderland of Rocks is one of several rocky areas:

- An area of rhyolite tuff formations in Chiricahua National Monument in Arizona
- An area of monzogranite formations in Joshua Tree National Park in California

== See also ==
- Wonderland (disambiguation)
