= Rosen Tantau =

Rose breeding company in the District of Pinneberg in Schleswig-Holstein, Germany

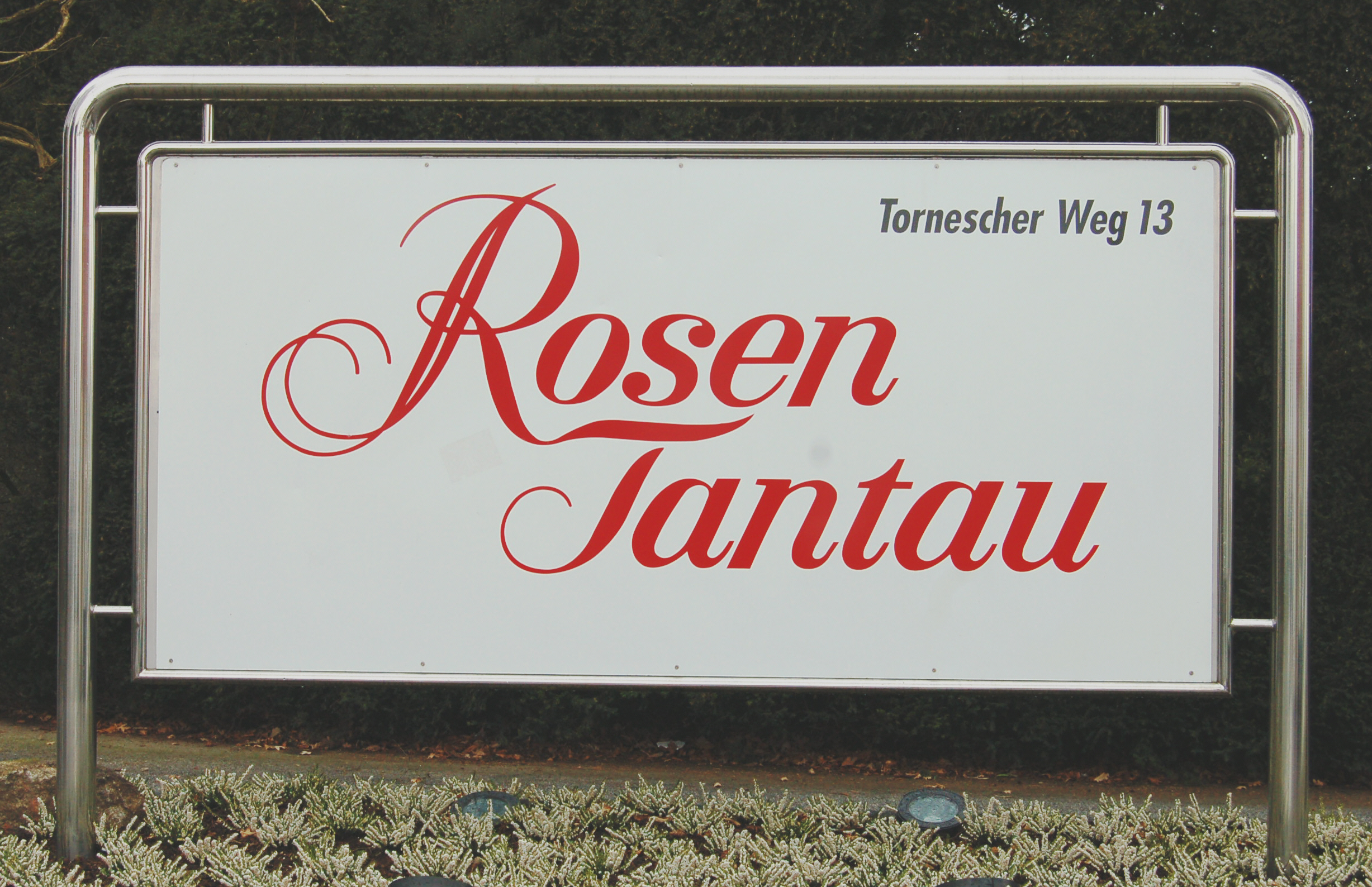
Company nameplate

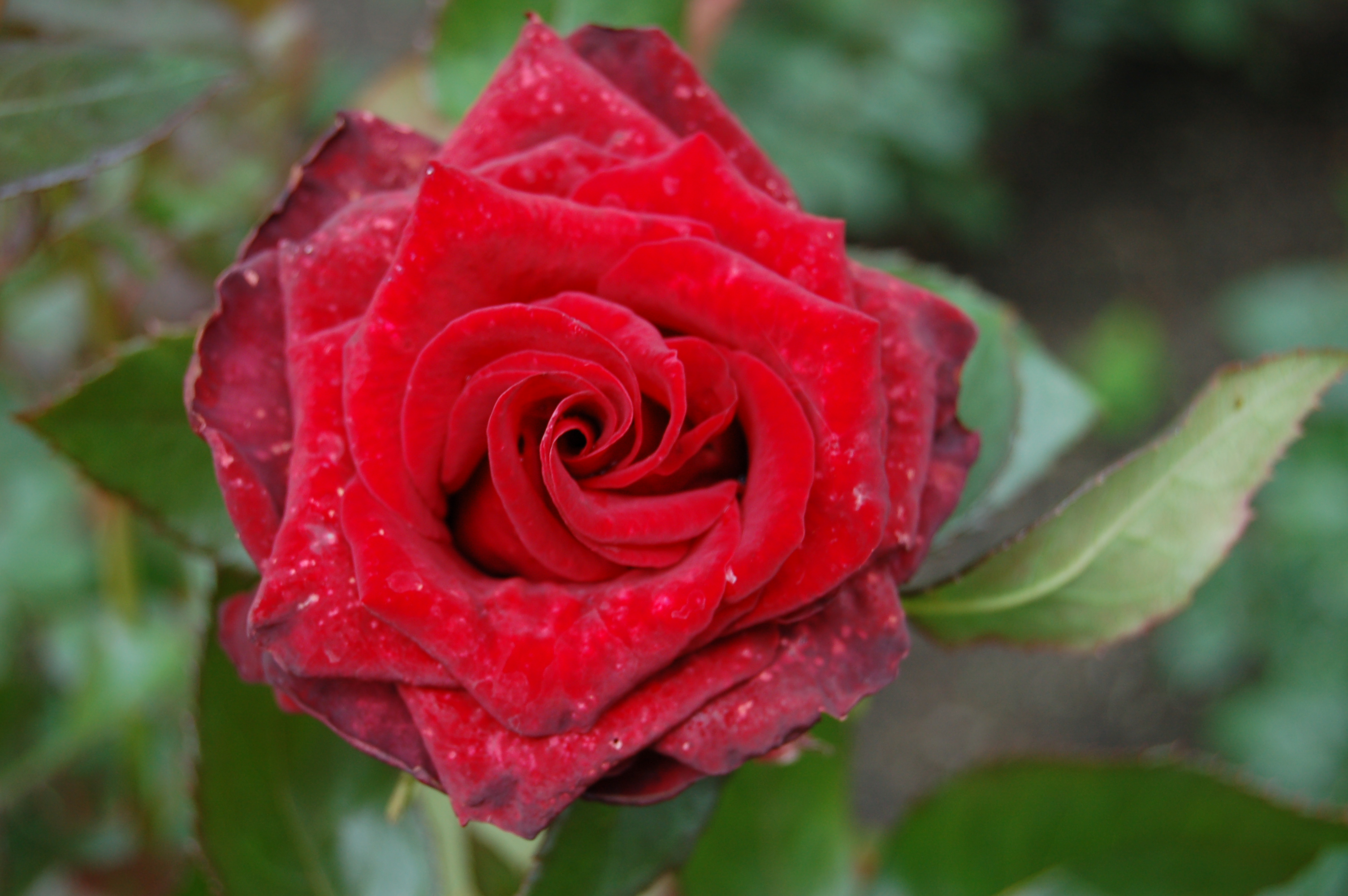
'Black Magic', 1997

Rosen Tantau (also RosenWelt Tantau) is a rose breeding company located at Uetersen, in the District of Pinneberg in Schleswig-Holstein, Germany.

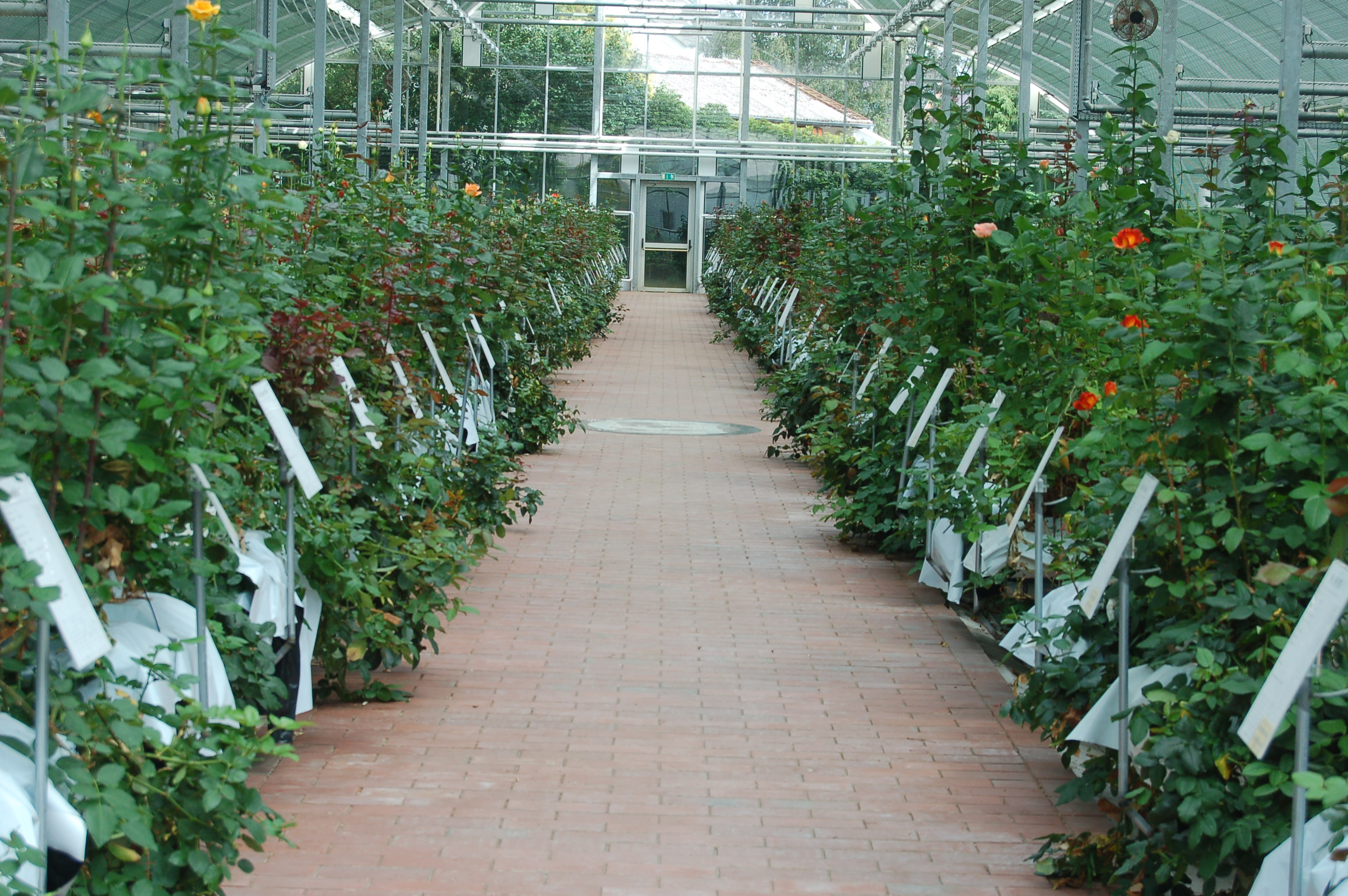
Glasshouse in Uetersen

It is one of the most important Rose farms worldwide, and has developed a large number of well-known rose cultivars. Founded in 1906 by Mathias Tantau (1882–1953), it became important in the 1930s. In 1948, his son Mathias Tantau jun. (1912–2006) took over. He developed some famous hybrid tea roses, e.g. 'Polarstern', 'Super Star' or 'Fragrant Cloud', earning many rose awards - 'Fragrant Cloud' was awarded the title World's Favorite Rose in 1981. 1985 Mathias Tantau sold the family business to Hans-Jürgen Evers (1940–2007), who had joined Tantau in 1963. From 2000 to 2007 his son Christian Evers was co-manager of the company he is leading today.

The company has about 90 employees and 50 sales agencies around the world. Annually more than two million rose plants are sold worldwide at retail and wholesale, and as many by license for Australia, Japan United States and Latin America. To date, the company brought more than 350 rose varieties on the market. Together with W. Kordes’ Söhne in Klein Offenseth-Sparrieshoop, Germany, the company dominates 50 percent of the world market for cut roses. Rosen Tantau's cultivar 'Black Magic' is one of the most successful rose varieties ever.

== Rose cultivars by Tantau (selection) ==
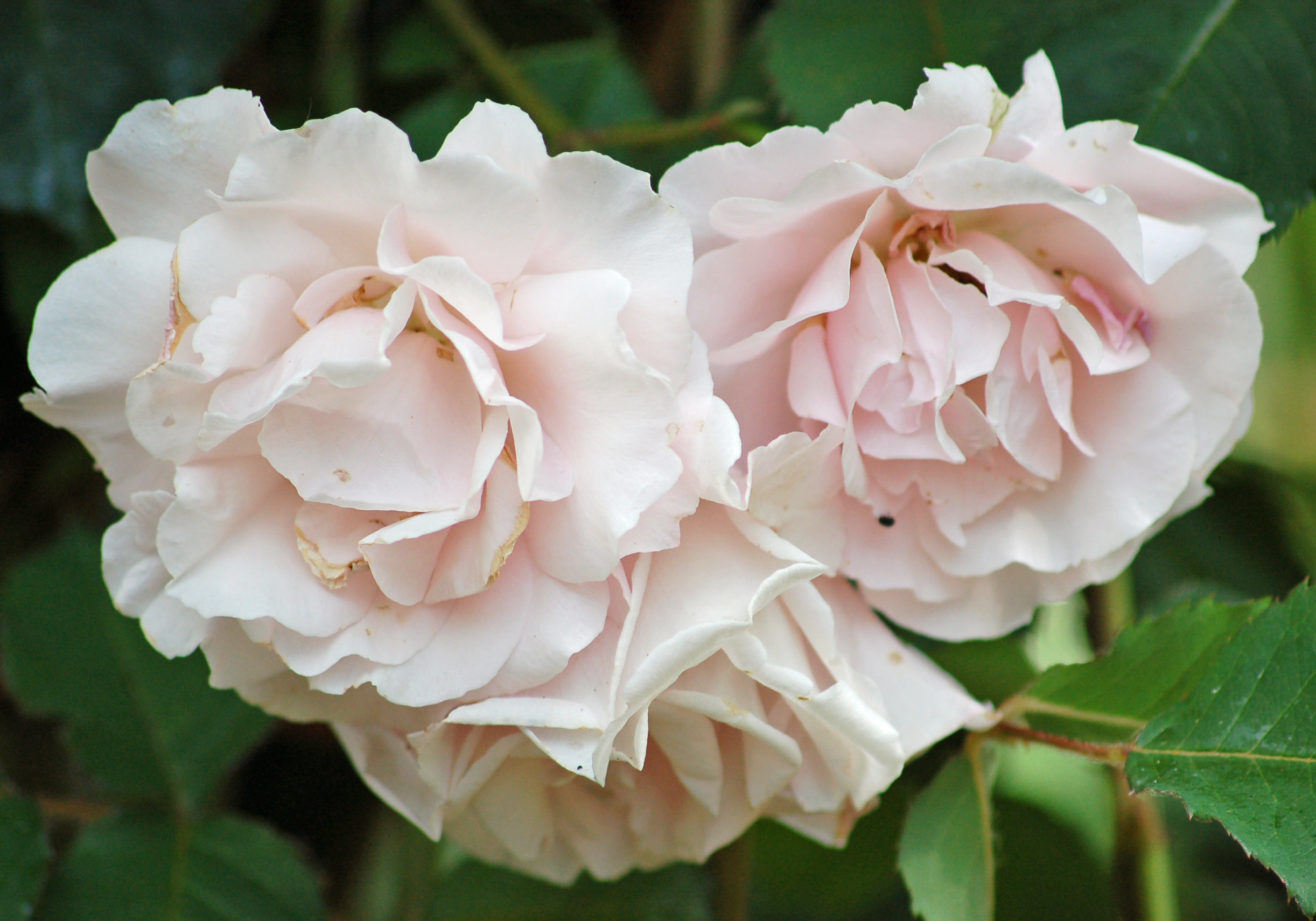
'Johanna Röpcke', 1931

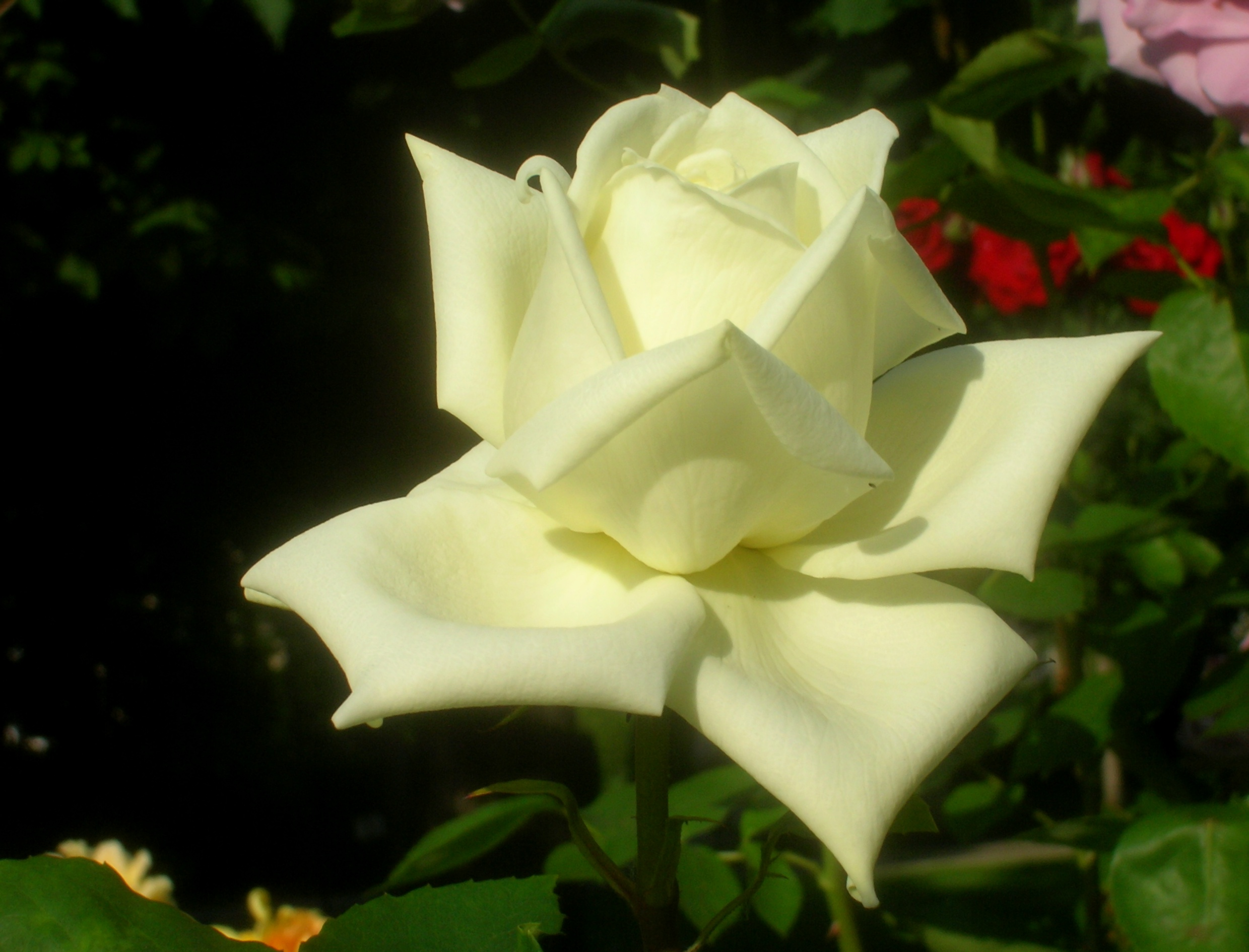
'Polarstern', 1963

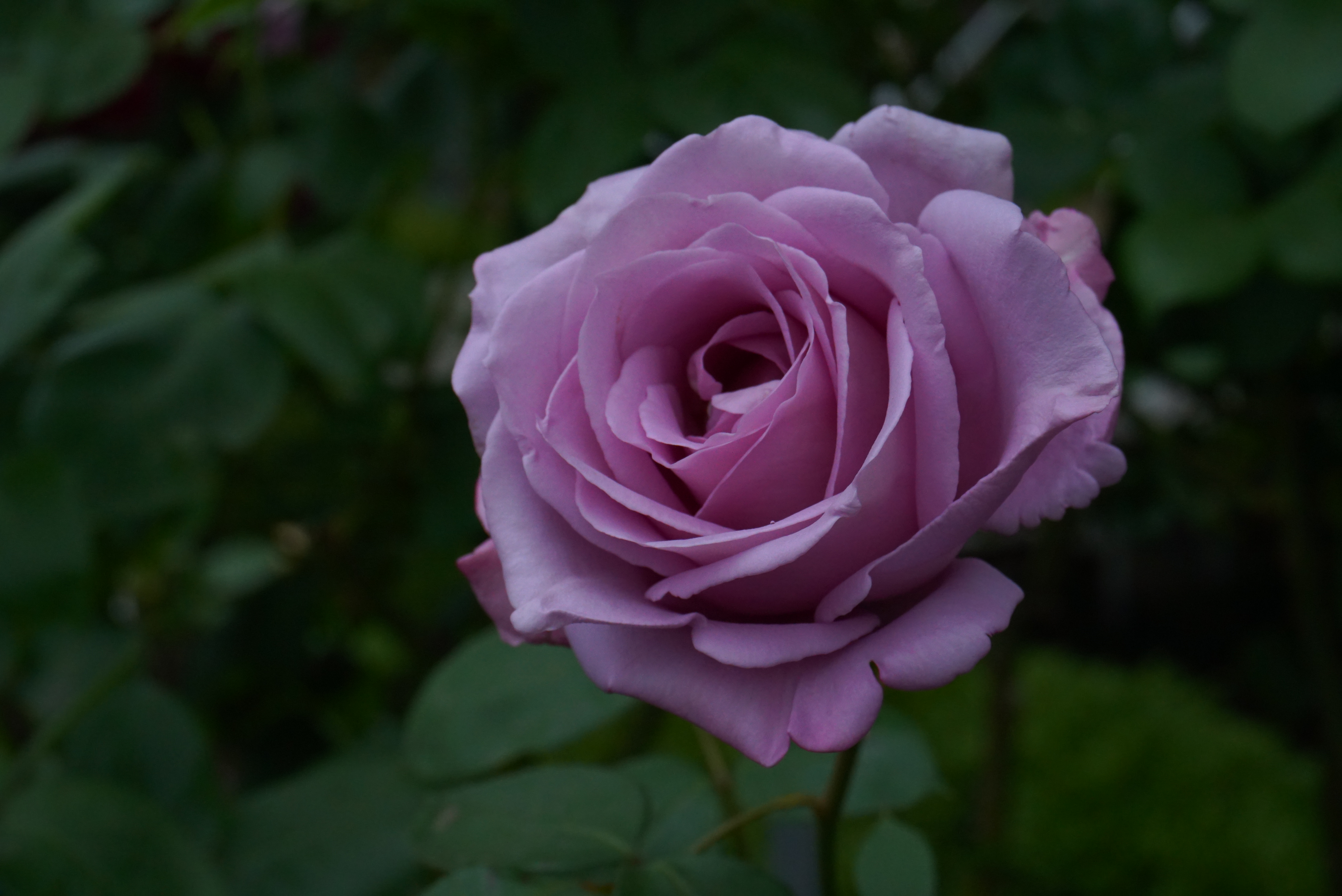
'Mainzer Fastnacht (Blue Moon, Blue Monday)', 1964

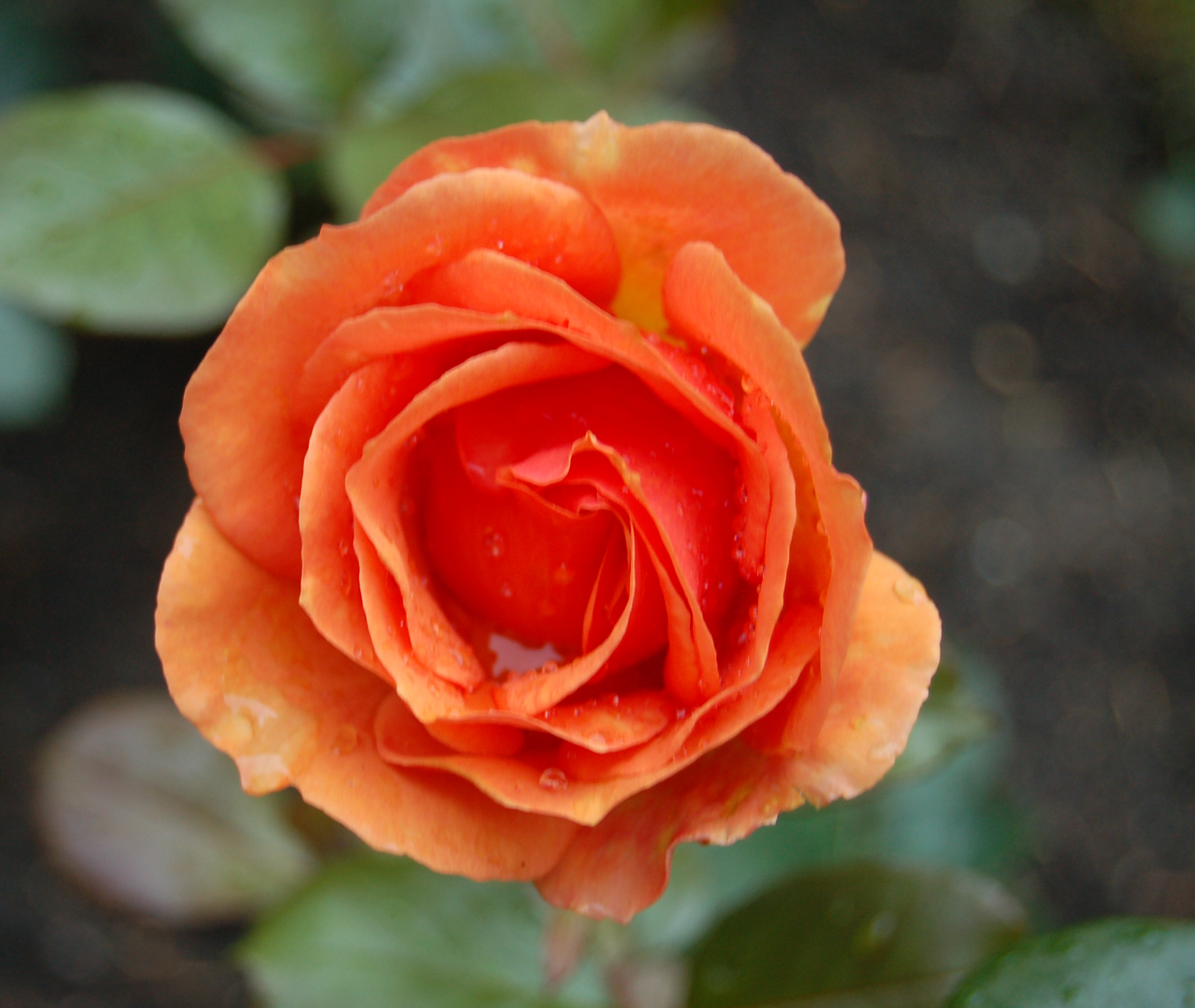
'Ashram', 1999

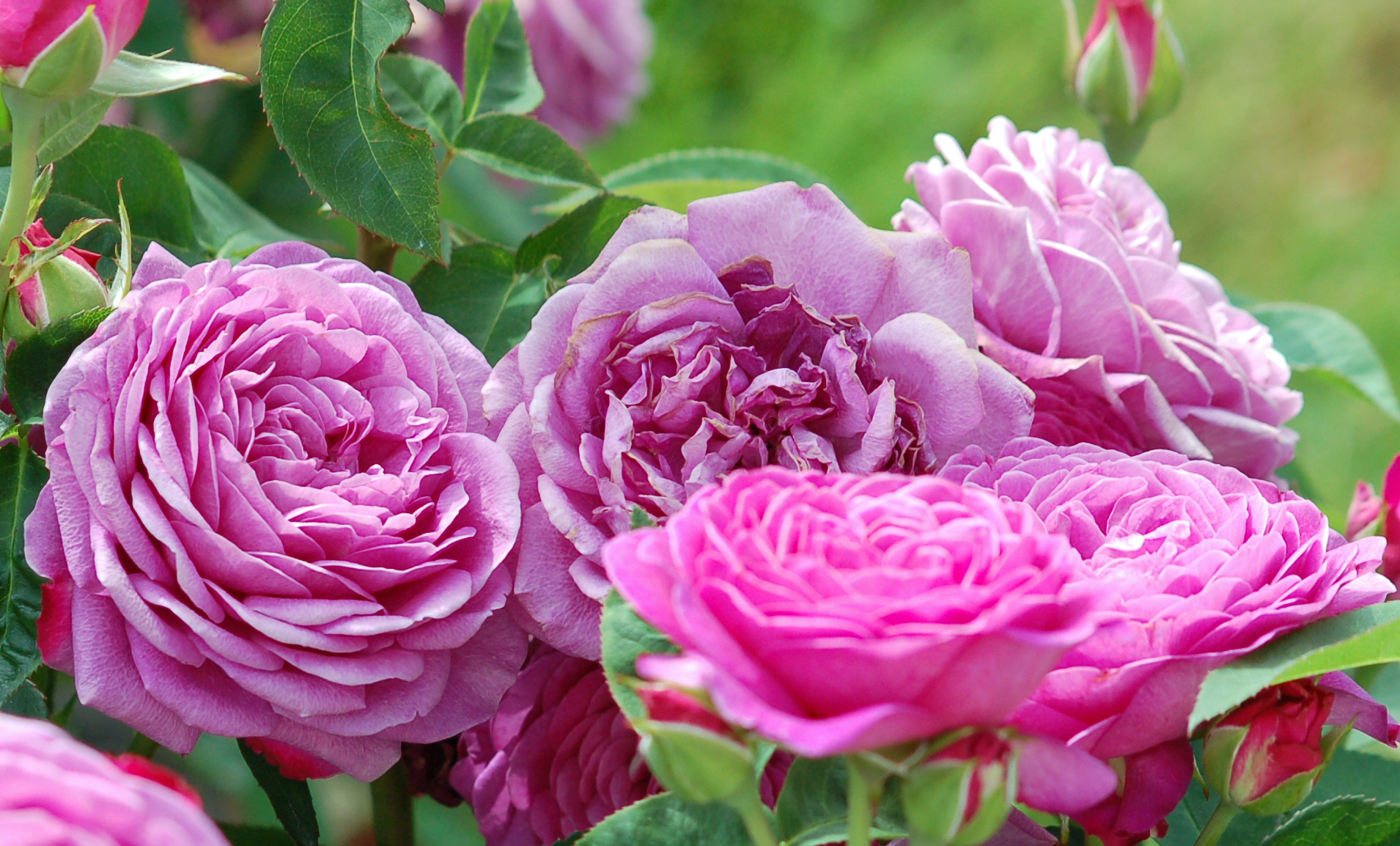
'Heidi Klum Rose', 2005

- 'Johanna Röpcke' (1931)
- 'Garnette' (1947)
- 'Konrad Adenauer' (1954)
- 'Super Star' (1960)
- 'Fragrant Cloud' (1963)
- 'Polarstern' (1963)
- 'Mainzer Fastnacht (Blue Moon, Blue Monday)' (1964)
- 'Black Lady' (1976)
- 'Camp David' (1984)
- 'Ilseta' (1985)
- 'Monica' (1985)
- 'Santana' (1985)
- 'Diadem' (1986)
- 'Bernstein Rose' (1987)
- 'Schneewalzer' (1987)
- 'Barkarole' (1988)
- 'Majolika' (1988)
- 'Mirato' (1990) ("ADR-Rose" 1993, "Rose of the Year" and TGC 1992, "Top Rose" the Netherlands)
- 'Pierette' (1992) ("ADR-Rose" 1992)
- 'Satina' (1992) ("ADR-Rose" 2004)
- 'Schneekönigin' (1992) ("ADR-Rose" 1995)
- 'Softy II' (1992)
- 'Foxi' (1993) ("ADR-Rose" 1993)
- 'Sonnenschirm' (1993) ("President Trophy" England)
- 'Tea Time' (1994) ("Rosenkönigen" Mainau 1997-2002 und 2004)
- 'Black Magic' (1995) ("Goldene Rose" Baden-Baden 2000)
- 'Aspirin-Rose' (1997) ("ADR-Rose" 1995), Gold medal, Barcelona, 2007
- 'Austriana' (1997), Gold medal, Westbroekpark 1997
- 'Ashram' (1999)
- 'Augusta Luise' (1999)
- 'Pastella' (2004) ("Golden Rose" Baden-Baden 2003)
- 'Chippendale' (2005)
- 'Heidi Klum Rose' (2005)
- Sweet Haze, Rose of the year, 2007
