= Heidi Klum rose =

Flowering plant cultivar

Rosa 'Tan00681'
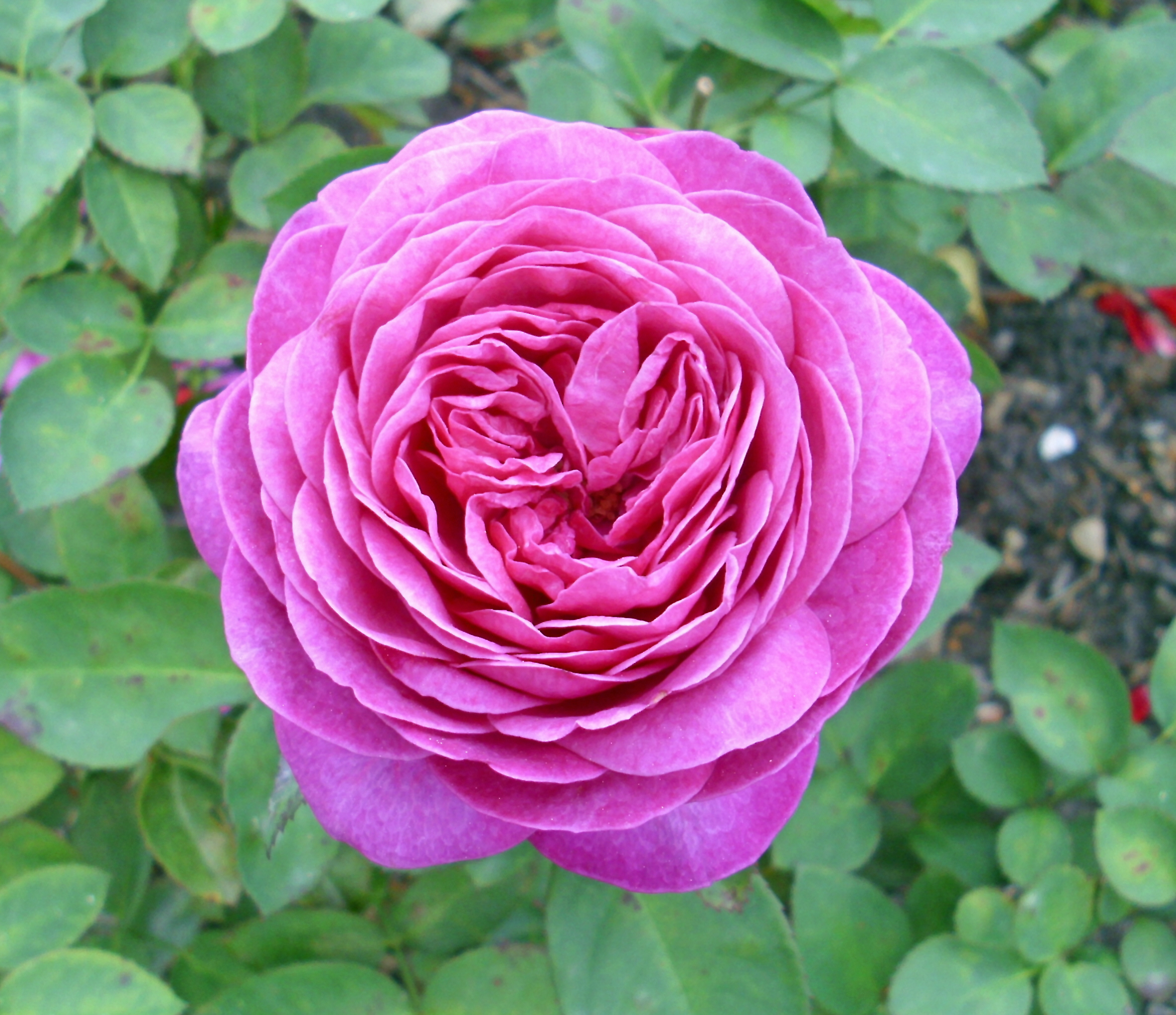
- Hybrid parentage: see text
- Cultivar: Rosa 'Tan00681'
- Marketing names: Heidi Klum Rose
- Origin: Tantau, Germany, 1999

The Heidi Klum rose is a variety of Floribunda rose from the Tantau company, registered in 1999 with the registration number RT 00681. It was made by crossing Old Port and Barkarole roses. Heidi Klum named the variety after herself in 2005.

It is a compact, richly flowering rose with a powerful scent. Under normal conditions it reaches a height of 40 to 50 cm. The flowers can reach a size of up to 9 cm, and can have as many as 40 petals. The flower color is predominantly violet and the foliage is green and rich.

The Heidi Klum rose can tolerate temperatures as low as –23 °C but is somewhat susceptible to mildew and Diplocarpon rosae. Therefore, it needs regular maintenance.

== Other names ==
Rose 'Heidi Klum', Floribunda rose 'Heidi Klum', Cluster flower rose 'Heidi Klum', Rosa 'Heide Klum Rose', Rosa 'TAN00681', Rosa 'RT00-681'.
