= Martin A. Couney =

American physician and neonatal technology pioneer

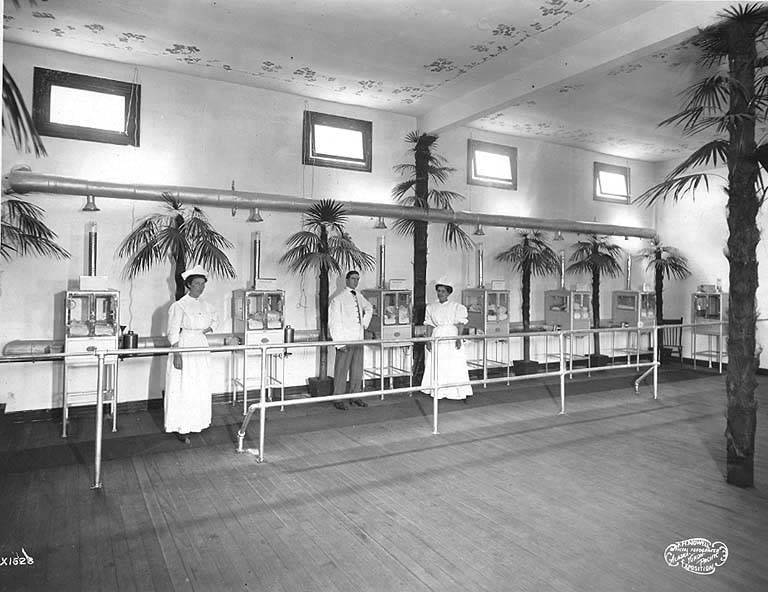
- Couney (middle) at his exhibit for the Alaska–Yukon–Pacific Exposition, 1909
- Born: Martin Cohen; 1869; Krotoszyn, Kingdom of Prussia (now Poland)
- Died: March 1, 1950 (aged 80); Coney Island, New York, U.S.
- Education: Leipzig or Berlin
- Spouse: Annabelle Maye (m. 1903; died 1936)
- Children: Hildegarde Couney
- Medical career
- Profession: Physician
- Field: Neonatology
- Sub-specialties: Neonatal incubators

Martin Arthur Couney (born Michael Cohen, 1869 – March 1, 1950) was an American obstetrician of German-Jewish descent, an advocate and pioneer of early neonatal technology. Couney, also known as 'the Incubator Doctor', was best known in medical circles and public view for his amusement park sideshow, "The Infantorium", in which visitors paid 25 cents to view prematurely born babies displayed in incubators.

After allegedly apprenticing under Pierre-Constant Budin, an established French obstetrician in the 1890s, Couney began exhibiting incubators at expositions and fairgrounds around In Europe, and then America. Couney is best-known for his Infantorium at Coney Island, New York. During Couney's active years at fairgrounds across America, it was widely believed that premature babies were "weaklings", who were unfit to survive into adulthood. Couney was one of the first advocates for premature babies, and his Infantoriums have become widely accredited with saving the lives of over 6,500 premature babies. Couney is additionally recognised as one of the first pioneers of neonatological technology.

== Early life ==
Martin Couney was born Michael Cohen (or Cohn) in 1869 in the town of Krotoszyn, which was then part of German Prussia and is now Poland. Couney's cultural and professional background remain contested as Couney repeatedly changed the details about his personal background throughout his life. The ambiguity of his early life has long impacted his work and reputation. The mystery Couney enforced on his background was compounded by his lack of an official medical licence.

Couney stated he had studied in Leipzig and Berlin and that his medical licence was European, and therefore, that his doctorate was not applicable in America. However, there is no record of Couney ever studying medicine in any European institution. There is some evidence to suggest that Couney immigrated to the United States in 1888 when he was 19 years old; however this casts doubt on his claims both of having completed a medical degree and of having studied under Budin, due to the inconsistencies in this timeline.

In 1903, Couney married Annabelle Maye, a nurse employed in one of his 'Infantoriums'. In 1907, Couney's daughter, Hildegarde Couney, was born six weeks premature, weighing just three pounds (1.4 kilos). Couney's wife predeceased him in 1936.

== Apprenticeship and early career ==
Despite the many unknowns of Couney's life, it is widely accepted that he was an apprentice in Paris under Pierre-Constant Budin, an established obstetrician known as the founder of modern perinatal medicine. In 1896, Couney entered his first exhibition as Budin's intermediary to exhibit Budin's Kinderbrutanstalt, or 'child hatchery', to spectators at Berlin's Great Industrial Exposition. The exhibit was a success and in 1897, Couney was invited by exposition promoter Samuel Schenkein to host an exhibit at the Diamond Jubilee Celebration for Queen Victoria in London to present his first infant incubator show.

Following the European success of Couney's displays and a move to the United States, Couney held the American debut of his incubator show at the Trans-Mississippi Exposition in Omaha. Couney then began showcasing his Incubator shows in fairgrounds across the US, including the Pan-American Exposition in Buffalo, New York in 1901.

== Incubator evolution ==
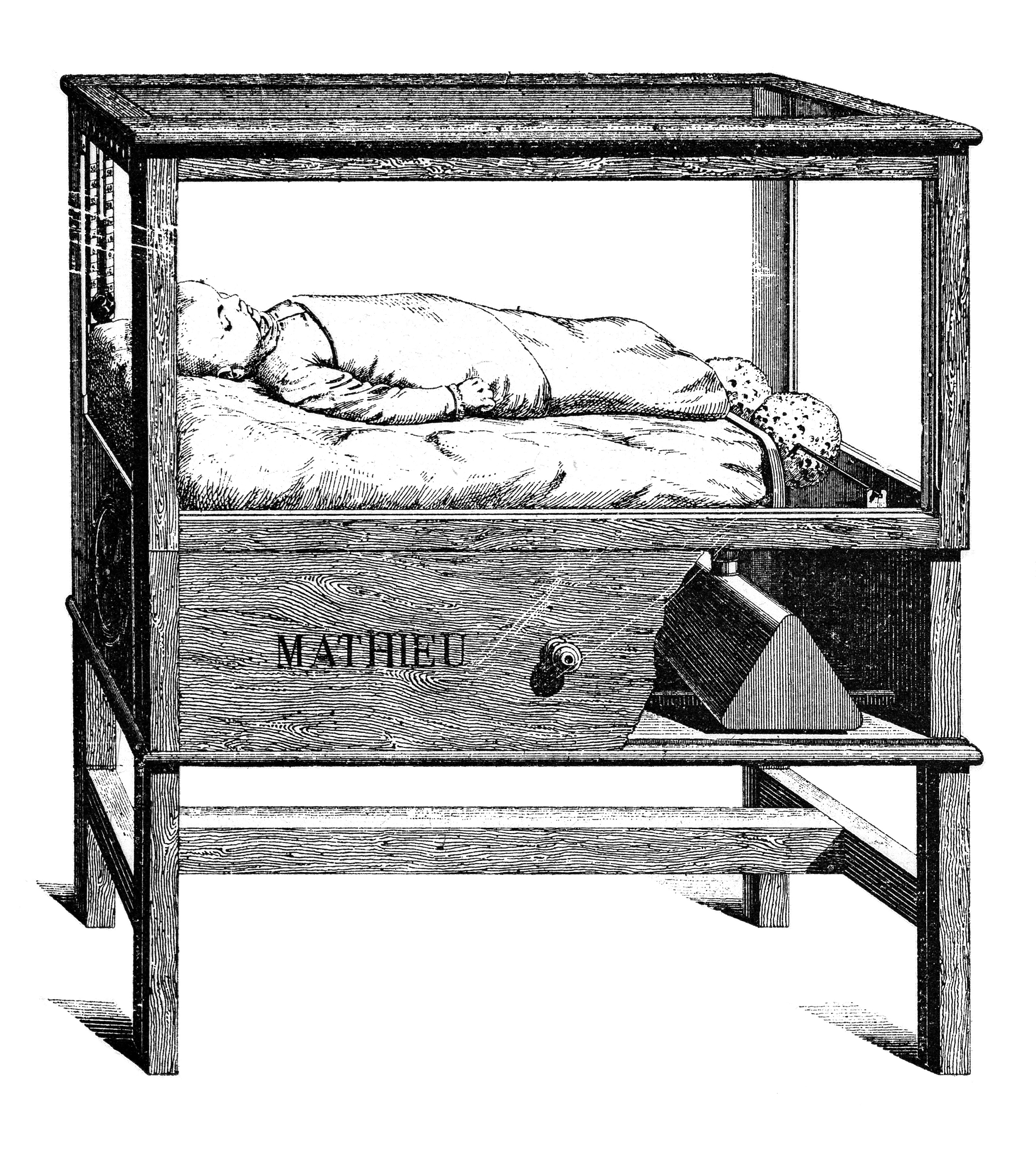
Artificial incubator for premature babies designed by R. Mathieu. Note the sides of glass and the inclusion of thermometer and sponges in the model.

Originally, incubators were used by poultry farmers to hatch chicken eggs, with the original design being little more than a heated, enclosed box. Stéphane Tarnier, a prominent French obstetrician in the nineteenth century, has been widely recognised as the first to implement incubators in the care of human infants. At the time, his ideas were deemed unscientific. It was not until his assistant, Budin, exhibited the incubators at Berlin's World Fair that the incubators gained considerable attention. Couney's alleged apprenticeship under Budin allowed him the knowledge and ability to promote and spread the medical importance of these machines.

The importance of the infant incubators was noted early on in Couney's career by medical journal The Lancet during the Diamond Jubilee of Queen Victoria in 1897. The Lancet editors visiting the infant exhibit noted that while the use of the incubators had "not yet become general in England", they further claimed that "any successful attempt to improve the construction of incubators and to render this life-saving apparatus available to the general public must be welcomed."

Each incubator at Couney's Infantorium measured around 1.5m high, with steel walls, framework and a glass front. In order to fill the incubators with warm air, water boilers fed warm water into pipes that ran underneath where the babies rested, and thermostats were placed inside the incubators to maintain and regulate temperatures. Couney was also concerned with the entrance of impurities into the air of the incubators. In order to filter out impurities in the air, the air fed into the pipes was first filtered through wool suspended in antiseptic, then again through dry wool. The air was then cycled out of the incubators, constantly refreshing the infant's air.

== The 'Infantorium' ==
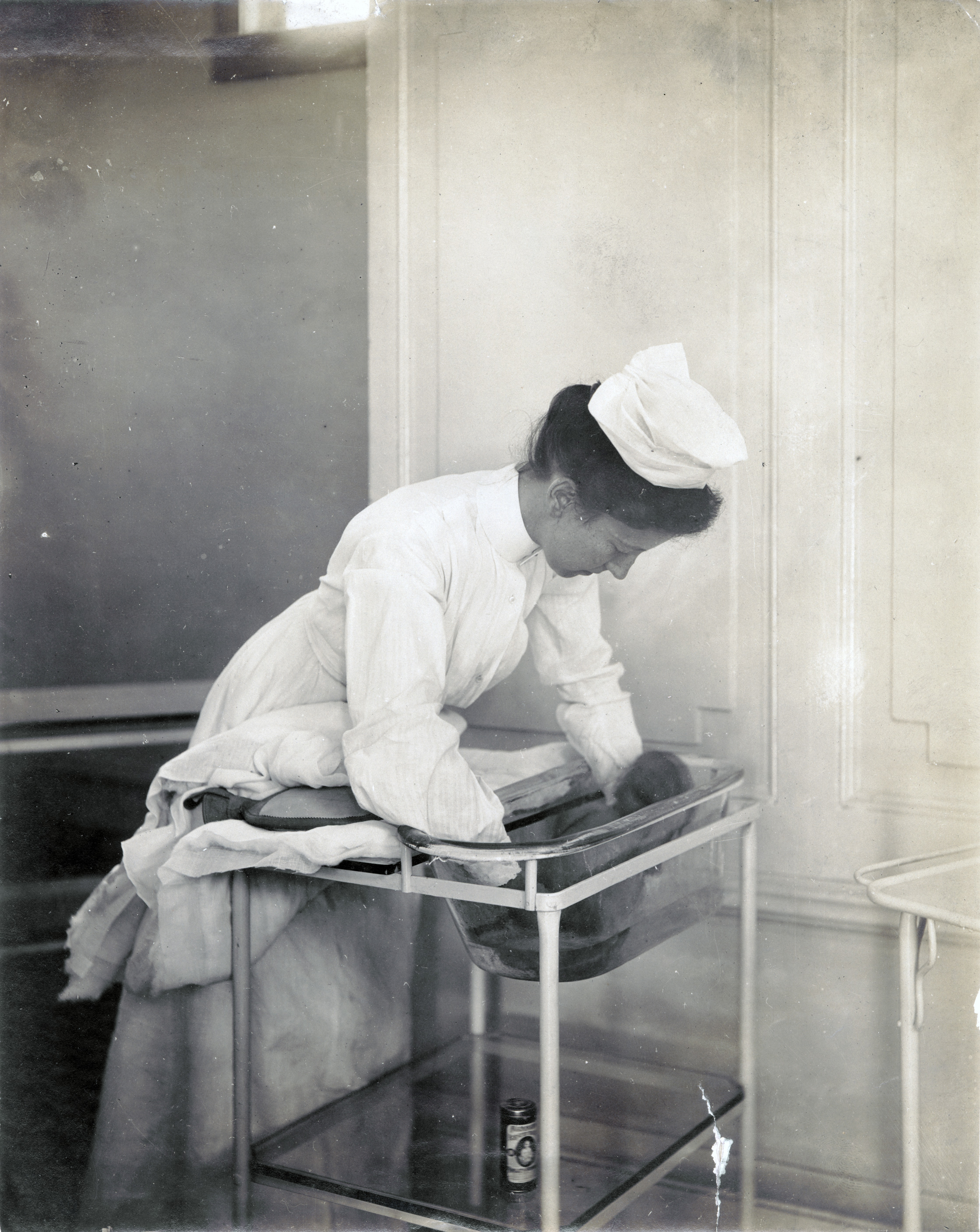
Nurse bathing an infant in the Baby Incubator exhibit

Couney's shows varied in name from fairground to fairground, including the 'Infantorium' and 'Baby Incubators'. Couney's slogan was 'All the world loves a baby' and he encouraged nurses to take the babies out and cuddle them in front of audiences. The babies were placed in incubators with glass doors to allow visitors to see in, and contained warm, filtered air. At the Coney Island 'Infantorium', Couney worked in tandem with established doctor Julius Hess and he employed a team of nurses who lived onsite, taking care of the premature infants at all hours. Couney is usually remembered for his Coney Island facility, but he also established a similar exhibit in Atlantic City which ran for 38 years, from 1905 to 1943. Couney's facilities were known for their professionalism and cleanliness. Couney was influenced by one of his employed nurses, and later wife, Annabelle Maye who insisted upon the importance of strict hygiene and systematic procedure.

In 1903, the average cost for the care of one infant at Couney's facility was $15 (equivalent to $537 in 2025). The care costs of premature babies was expensive, however, Couney did not charge the parents of his patients for their care. Couney made up the costs of caring for the infants through the entrance fees during the exhibitions. The entrance fees covered not only the care of the infants, but also allowed Couney to pay his nurses a good wage and facilitated the frequent travel of the exhibit.

=== Infant care ===
Upon being admitted to Couney's care, infants would all undergo the same routine. The infants were first bathed in lukewarm water and, if they were capable, were given a small dose of brandy. Ribbons, either pink or blue, were tied around the babies and allowed visitors to identify the sex of the infants. The infants would be on show throughout the day in individual incubators, excluding two hours for feeding. The 'preemies' were fed breastmilk in three different ways, depending on the varying abilities of the infants to receive milk. Most were fed by either wet nurses or using bottles. However, some infants were administered breastmilk spooned through the nose by Madame Recht, one of Couney's long-time employees.

Couney placed strict diet restrictions on his wet nurses. While under his employment, wet nurses were not allowed to smoke, consume foods such as hamburgers, or drink alcohol, as Couney believed doing so would impact the quality of their breastmilk. Couney also encouraged his nurses to take the babies out of the incubators and cuddle them in front of audiences. In addition to holding the infants at Coney Island, Madame Recht would show a diamond ring to audiences before sliding it up the babies' arms to emphasize the tiny size of the infants.

These performances however triggered outcry from child protection groups, claiming Couney objectified the infants for monetary gain. Indeed, in 1897 as Couney was starting his career in the field of neonatology, an anonymous source in the medical journal The Lancet condemned the exposition as “an unscrupulous way to make money”. Couney defended his sideshow, claiming his exhibits were the last resort for many 'preemies', and that his practice's survival rate was much higher in fact than many hospitals. In 1934, in order to demonstrate the importance and success rates of the incubators, Couney hosted a reunion at the Chicago World Fair for the babies that he and Hess had cared for in 1933. On July 25, 1934, 41 of the 58 babies, accompanied by their mothers, returned to Coney Island for a 'Homecoming' ceremony.

== Reputation ==
Couney's reputation suffered after the 1911 Coney Island Fire. Despite all of the infants being rescued, the incident highlighted the dangers of caring for infants in amusement parks. Others decried the entire notion of infant incubators in fairgrounds. In the medical journal The Lancet in 1897, an article titled "The Danger of Making a Public Show of Incubators for Babies" lamented the proximity of infant incubators to animal exhibits and peep shows, concerned that the unsanitary conditions of the animal exhibits would endanger the babies. It was also seen as inappropriate to house the infants so close to 'scandalous' peep shows, especially as the Infantorium shows attracted many families and children. The perceived dangers of 'preemie' fairground exhibits were accentuated by imposter shows, which began appearing in fairgrounds as a result of the profitability of shows such as Couney's Infantorium. These shows often did not adhere to the same cleanliness and professional standards as the well-known Infantorium. As a result, medical journals at the time condemned the shows as risky and dangerous for the premature infants.

The support of Julius Hess, who came to be known as the father of American neonatology, during the 1933 Chicago World Fair, improved Couney's reputation. The exhibit ran for two consecutive summers, over 18 months from 1933–1934. The facility cost $75,000 ($1.4 million today) to construct and was fronted by a huge sign bearing the words, “Living Babies in Incubators”. By the end of the second summer, Chicago's health commissioner had become involved in Couney's efforts. It was not long after the end of the fair that Chicago became the first American city to officially implement policies for the explicit purpose of premature infant care.

Throughout Couney's career, whenever a midway or fairground closed, Couney attempted to donate his incubators to local hospitals, though his donations were never accepted. By the year of Couney's death in March 1950, incubators had been integrated into public hospitals. Couney is now recognised as a pioneer of early infant care. His exhibits worked against the claims of the then popular eugenics movement and helped introduce the issue of premature births to the general populace. Due to the high fatality rates of prematurely born infants in the first half of the twentieth century, the topic was generally undiscussed. Couney's promotion of his Infantorium demonstrated that 'preemie' infant care could be successful, if expensive.

=== Eugenics movement ===
The eugenics movement of the early twentieth century presented an ideological contrast to Couney's treatment of premature babies. The eugenics movement was reaching its peak at the beginning of the 20th century and Couney's 'Infantoriums' were often showcased in the same fairgrounds as exhibitions supporting the eugenics movement. Articles in medical journals at the time condemned Couney's treatment of premature babies, stating the babies would pass on their “deficiencies, deformities and vices” to the next generation. A film produced by an American doctor in the early 1900s was even tagged “Kill Defectives, Save the Nation” and articles in medical journals questioned efforts to save premature infants, doubting the efficacy of such efforts. The prominence of the eugenics movement led many doctors at the time to perceive Couney as farcical, and premature babies were often left to die without medical intervention.

== See also ==
- Development of modern neonatology
- Wonderland Amusement Park (Minneapolis)

== Additional reading ==
- Raffel, Dawn The Strange Case of Dr. Couney: How a Mysterious European Showman Saved Thousands of American Babies (New York: Blue Rider Press, 2018)
- Prentice, Claire Miracle at Coney Island: How a Sideshow Doctor Saved Thousands of Babies and Transformed American Medicine (Amazon Kindle e-book, 2016)
