= Rosa 'Camp David' =

Rose cultivar

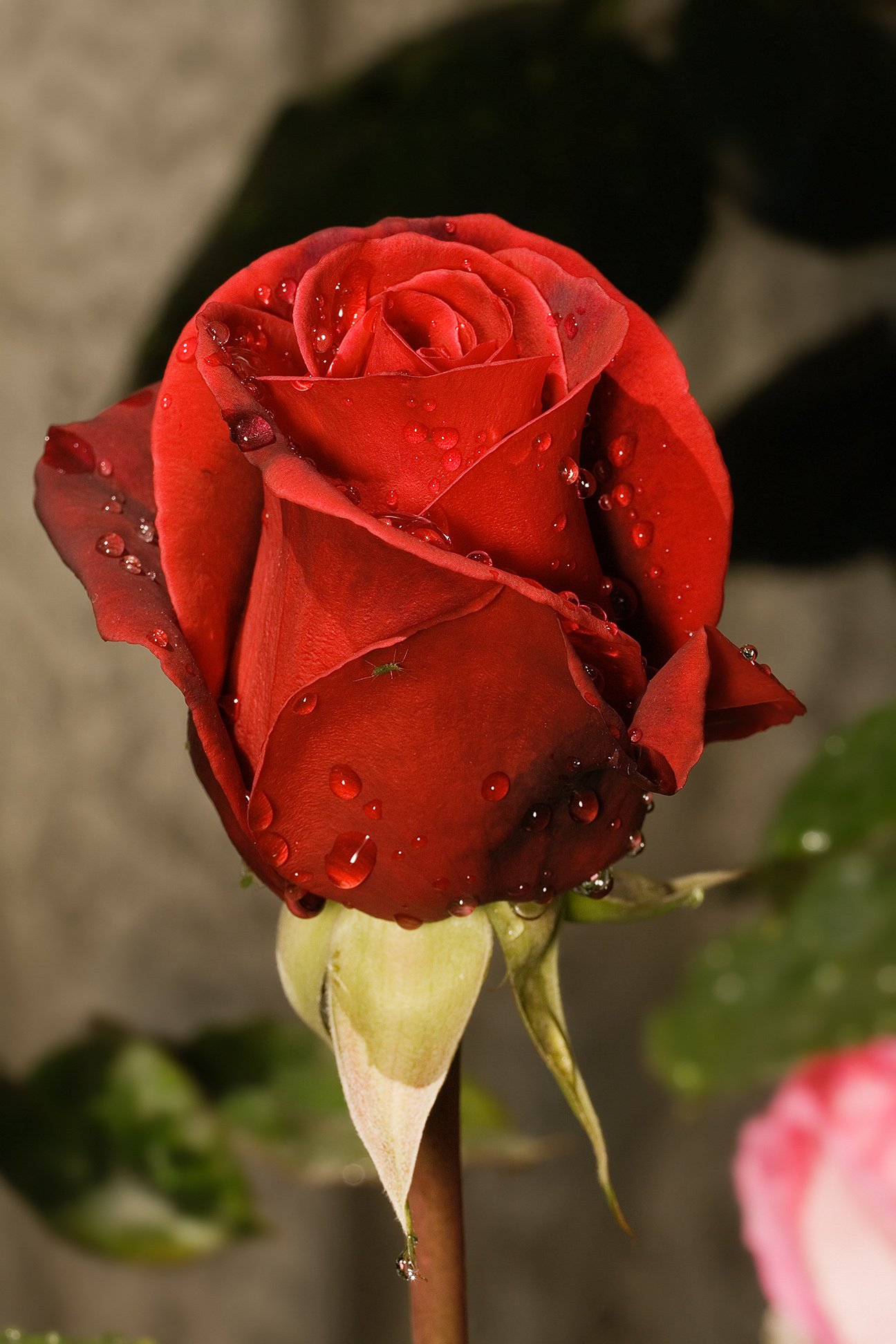
- Genus: Rosa
- Cultivar group: Hybrid tea
- Cultivar: 'Camp David'
- Origin: Tantau, Germany, 1984

Rosa 'Camp David' is a red hybrid tea rose developed by Mathias Tantau, Jr. in 1984.

== Description ==
The cultivar forms nearly black buds, which turn a deep red when blooming – and retain that color better under sun exposure than many other red roses. The fragrant flowers have an average diameter of about 13 cm and conserve their elegant form for a long time. Due to their solitary growth, they are used as cut flowers as well as in gardens.

The robust shrubs are of average height (~1.5 m), very weather and disease resistant and bloom in flushes throughout the season.

While the rose was hybridized in Germany, it was not introduced in its home country but in Australia, where the cultivar is well liked.

== Sources ==
- Agnes Pahler: Rosen : die große Enzyklopädie; [mit 2000 Sorten]. Dorling Kindersley, Starnberg 2004, ISBN 3-8310-0590-7
