= Wonder World Tour (disambiguation) =

Wonder World Tour was a 2009 concert tour by American singer Miley Cyrus.

Wonder World Tour may also refer to:

- Wonder World Tour (Wonder Girls), 2012

== See also ==
- Wonder: The World Tour, a 2022 concert tour by Canadian singer-songwriter Shawn Mendes
