= Wonderland (Heidi Klum song) =

Single by Heidi Klum
- Released: November 17, 2006 (Germany)
- Recorded: 2006
- Genre: Pop
- Length: 3:43
- Label: Warner Music Group

"Wonderland" is the debut single of German model Heidi Klum, released in Germany on iTunes Deutschland on November 17, 2006. The song was written for a series of television advertisements for the German retailer Douglas. Proceeds from the single were given to a children's charity in her hometown of Bergisch Gladbach.

== Charts ==
Chart (2006)	Peak position
Austria (Ö3 Austria Top 40)	21
Germany (GfK)	13
Switzerland (Schweizer Hitparade)	38
