= Noosa (singer-songwriter) =

American singer-songwriter

- Origin: Long Island, New York City, U.S.
- Genres: Electropop · dream pop · synthpop
- Years active: 2012–present
- Members: Sky Barbarick (vocals, songwriting & production)
- Website: instagram.com/sky.barbarick/

Sky Barbarick, known professionally as Noosa, is a Los Angeles–based American singer-songwriter and multi-instrumentalist.

== Career ==
The name comes from the place of the same name in Australia where Sky became inspired to write songs as a way of "translating [her] spirit to the world".

Noosa was exposed to the world when Sky's song "Mirrors in the Moonlight" was transformed into her first single "Fear of Love". This and a string of later singles went to #1 on The Hype Machine. Since then, Noosa has released a 5 track EP in 2013, with one of its tracks featured on a Kellogg's commercial, and a debut studio album entitled Wonderland in 2014. In 2017 Noosa collaborated with progressive house producer Pierce Fulton on his album Better Places including tracks "1 800 SUCCEED", "Autumn Blossom", and "The Sound", leading to the "Better Places tour" along with NVDES. Following the album, the two released their song "Overthinking Rain" in 2019, which has amassed millions of plays. Sky’s creative and fun vibe combined with a deep sense of the ethereal journey of life makes for thoughtful and beautiful lyrics.

== Discography ==
=== Studio albums ===
- Wonderland (2014)

=== EPs ===
- Noosa (2012)
- The California Songs (2017)

=== Singles ===
- "Fear of Love" (2012) (#1 on The Hype Machine)
- "Walk on By" (2012)
- "Walk on By (Sound Remedy remix)" (2012) (The Hype Machine Top Ten Tracks of 2012)
- "Heartache" (2012)
- "Halo" (2015)
- "Like You" (2017)

=== Featured singles ===
- Ghost Beach – "Close Enough" (2013) (#1 on The Hype Machine)
- Pierce Fulton (artist) – "Overthinking Rain" (2019)
- Pierce Fulton (artist) – "What Is Gonna Make You Happy" (2019)
