= Wonderland (Noosa album) =

Studio album by Noosa
- Released: 21 May 2014
- Recorded: In Mickey Valen's apartment
- Genre: dream pop, synthpop
- Length: 36:45
- Label: Independent
- Producer: Mickey Valen

Wonderland is the debut album by the American singer-songwriter Noosa, released May 21, 2014.

The album was recorded in 2013 by producer Mickey Valen in his apartment, and mixed by Jared Robbins. Wonderland is pressed in vinyl.

== Track listing ==
All tracks are written by Sky Barbarick

No.	Title	Length
1.	"Love"	3:55
2.	"Wildfire"	3:47
3.	"Begin Again"	3:36
4.	"Golden One"	4:20
5.	"Clocktower"	4:15
6.	"Walk on By"	3:56
7.	"Forest Lane"	3:49
8.	"Sail"	4:45
9.	"Stranger"	4:22
