= Wonderland Amusement Park (Beijing) =

Unfinished amusement park in Beijing

Wonderland
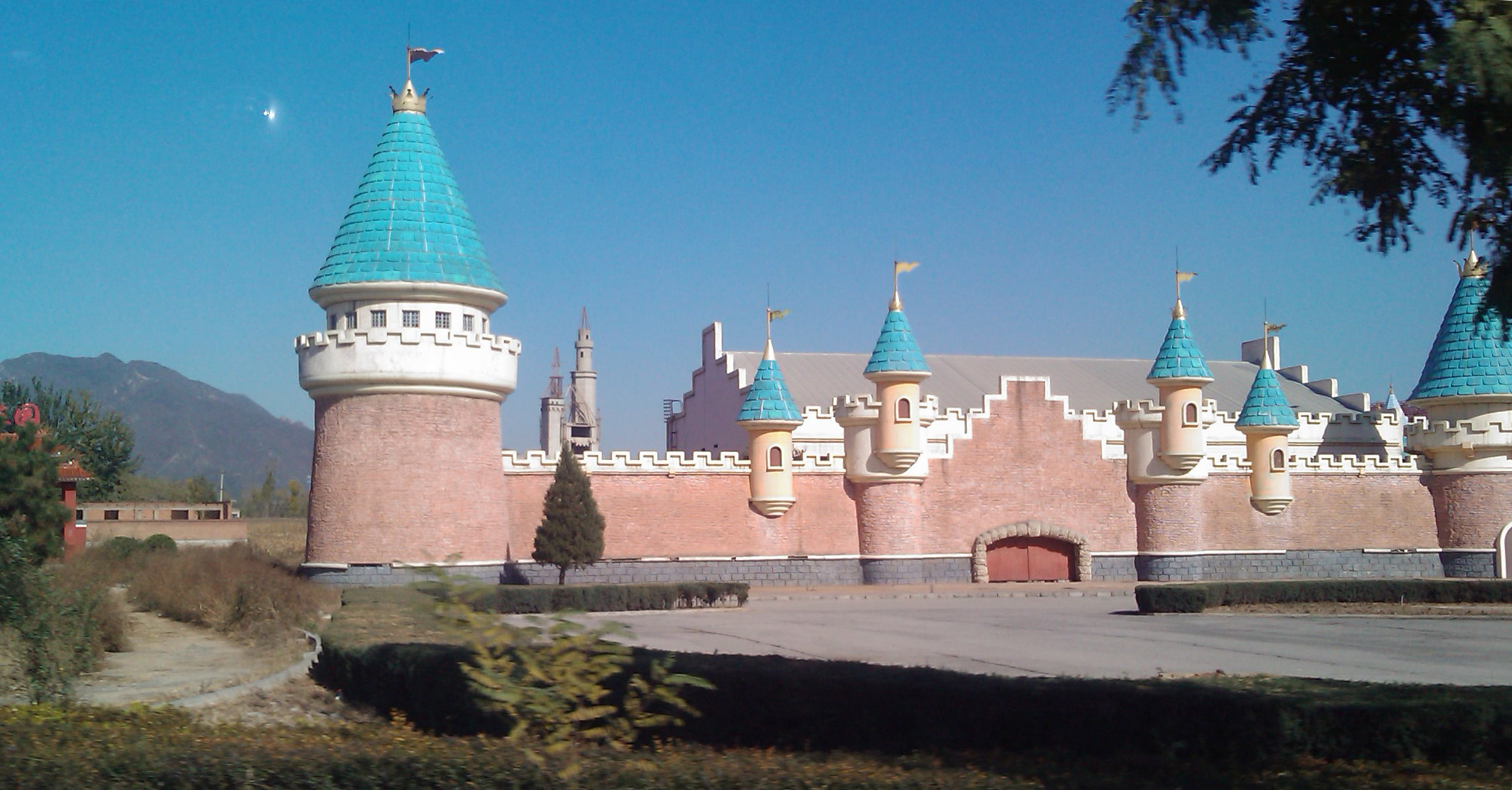
- View of Wonderland in 2010 before the structure was demolished.
- Interactive map of Wonderland
- Location: Changping District, Beijing, China
- Coordinates: 40.2330°N 116.1638°E
- Status: Defunct
- Opened: Never opened (abandoned)
- Owner: Reignwood Group
- Area: 120 acres (49 ha)

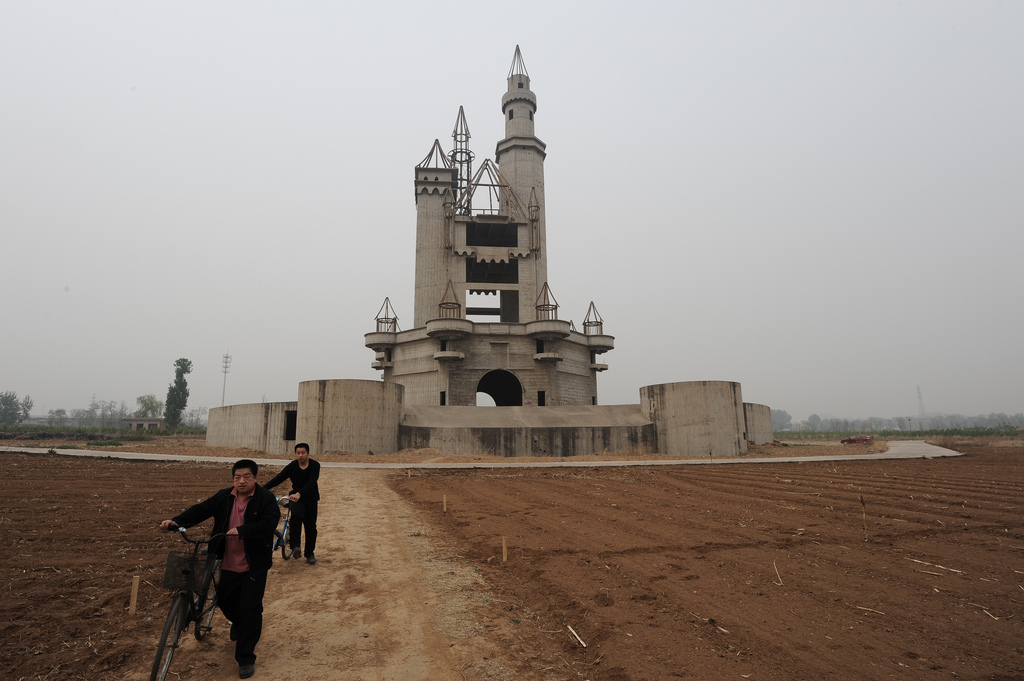
View of the park's unfinished castle, which is still intact as of 2025.

Wonderland was an unfinished amusement park project located in Chenzhuang Village (陈庄村), Nankou Town (南口地区), Changping District, Beijing, China. Originally proposed by the Thailand-based property developer Reignwood Group, and designed to be the largest amusement park in Asia (to have covered 120 acres (49 ha)), construction stopped in 1998 following financial problems with local officials, while a 2008 attempt to start construction again also failed.

The site featured a number of abandoned structures, including the framework of a castle-like building and medieval-themed outer buildings. Land was reclaimed by local farmers to grow their various crops while the site was abandoned. People have reported when visiting the site that, sometimes, there would still be parking attendants in the site's parking lot, presumably to tend to onlookers and curious sightseers that came to visit.

The abandonment of such a massive construction project raised concerns about the existence of a property bubble in China.

The incomplete and abandoned structures were demolished in May 2013, leaving no hope for the abandoned park to ever be finished. While there was no official indication of what would be done with the grounds of where the park once stood, An Feng, Reignwood Group's chief inspector for the company's investment supervision department, stated a "comprehensive luxury product supermarket" would be built on the site, but at that time the project was still going through "planning permission formalities".

Construction on a shopping mall, the Badaling Outlets (Chinese: 八达岭奥莱; pinyin: Bādálǐng Àolái), was later completed in 2015 and opened to the public on 26 June of that year.

== See also ==
- Beijing Shijingshan Amusement Park
- New South China Mall
