= Wonderland Amusement Park (Minneapolis) =

Closed amusement park in Minneapolis, Minnesota, United States

- Shoot the Chutes at Wonderland Amusement Park
- Interactive map of Wonderland Amusement Park
- Location: Minneapolis
- Coordinates: 44.946346°N 93.225690°W
- Status: Defunct
- Opened: 1905
- Closed: 1911
- Owner: H. A. Dorsey
- Operating season: late May through early September

Wonderland was an amusement park that operated in the Longfellow neighborhood of Minneapolis from 1905 through 1911. The ten-acre site was located between Lake Street and 32nd Street and 31st and 33rd Avenues.

== Attractions ==
A 120-foot tower, lit by thousands of electric lights, was Wonderland's focal point and could be seen from a distance of five miles. Among the other attractions were a scenic railway (roller coaster), old mill, carousel and house of nonsense. After the park's demise, some of its rides ended up at Excelsior Amusement Park on Lake Minnetonka. The aerial swing, however, was purchased by Marion Savage for use at Antlers Park in Lakeville.

One of the park’s most popular features was the "Infant Incubator Institute", whose owner, Dr. Martin A. Couney, had similar exhibits at amusement parks and expositions throughout the country and in Europe. The hospital, the only remaining structure from Wonderland, is now an apartment building at the intersection of 31st Avenue and 31st Street.

== Lawsuit ==
In 1905 Elim Presbyterian Church sued Wonderland in an effort to close the park down. Elim, on the northwest corner of 32nd Avenue and Lake Street, was opposite Wonderland’s main entrance. It argued that the park's crowds and noise interfered with worship services. The case was settled out of court, and the owners of Wonderland had the church moved to land they had purchased at 33rd Street and 30th Avenue. The congregation, later known as Vanderburgh Presbyterian Church, continued at that location for decades, and a house of worship is found there still.

== Gallery ==
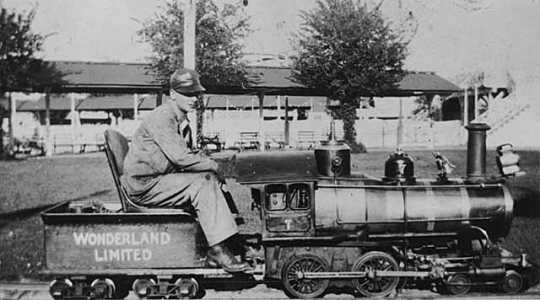
Miniature train

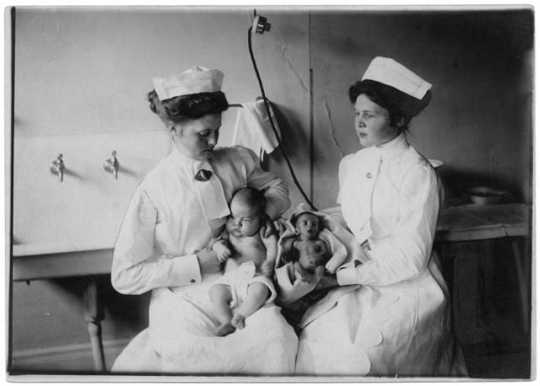
Premature infants who were kept in incubators at the Infantorium

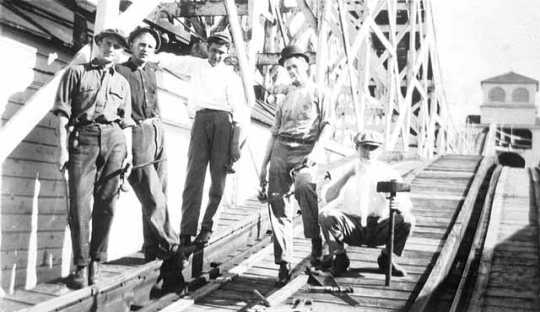
Roller coaster crew

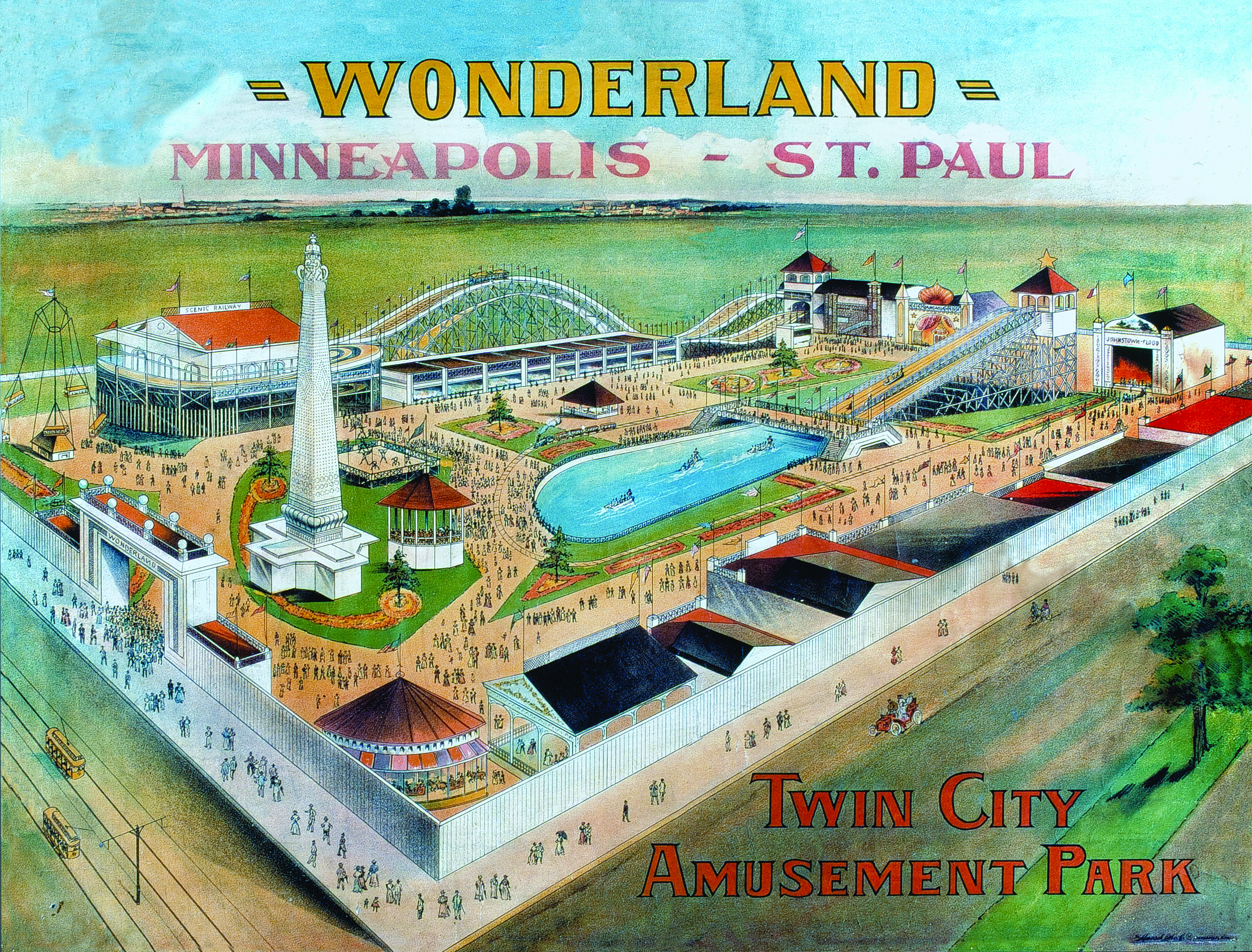
Wonderland Amusement Park Poster

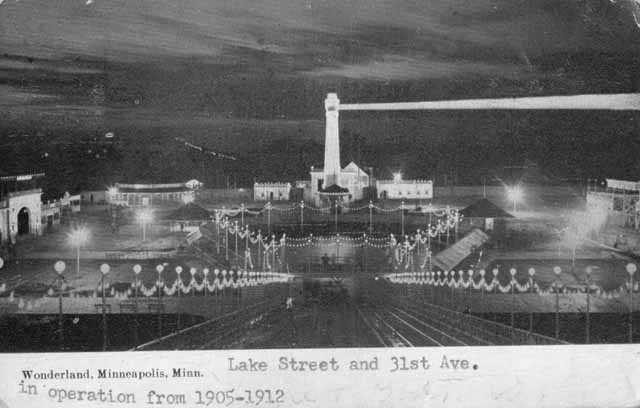
Wonderland Amusement Park at night

== See also ==
- Trolley park
