= Stonehenge replicas and derivatives =

This is a list of Stonehenge replicas and derivatives that seeks to collect all the non-ephemeral examples together. The fame of the prehistoric monument of Stonehenge in England has led to many efforts to recreate it, using a variety of different materials, around the world. Some have been carefully built as astronomically aligned models whilst others have been examples of artistic expression or tourist attractions.

== Astronomically aligned replicas ==
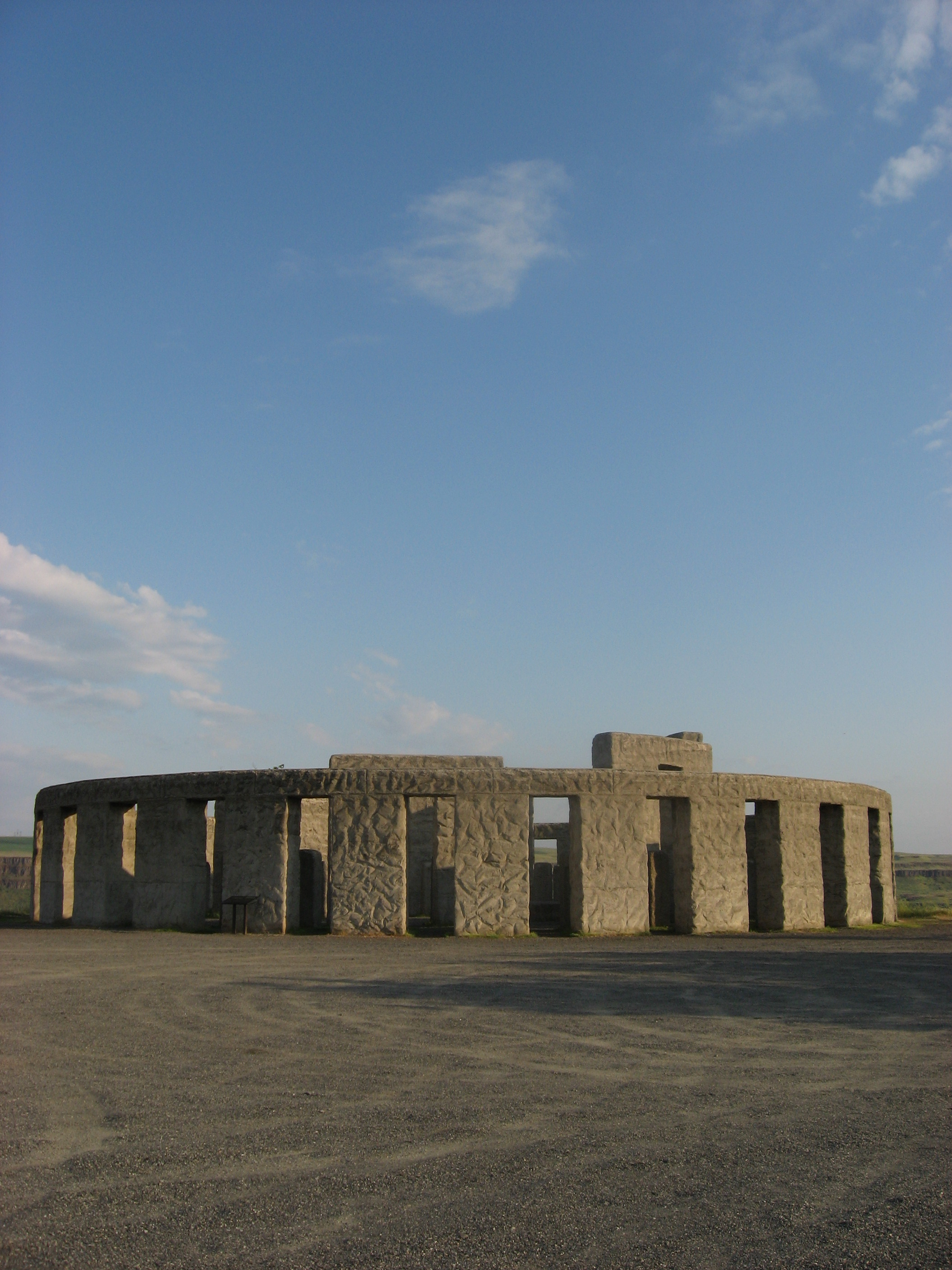
Maryhill's full-size replica of Stonehenge

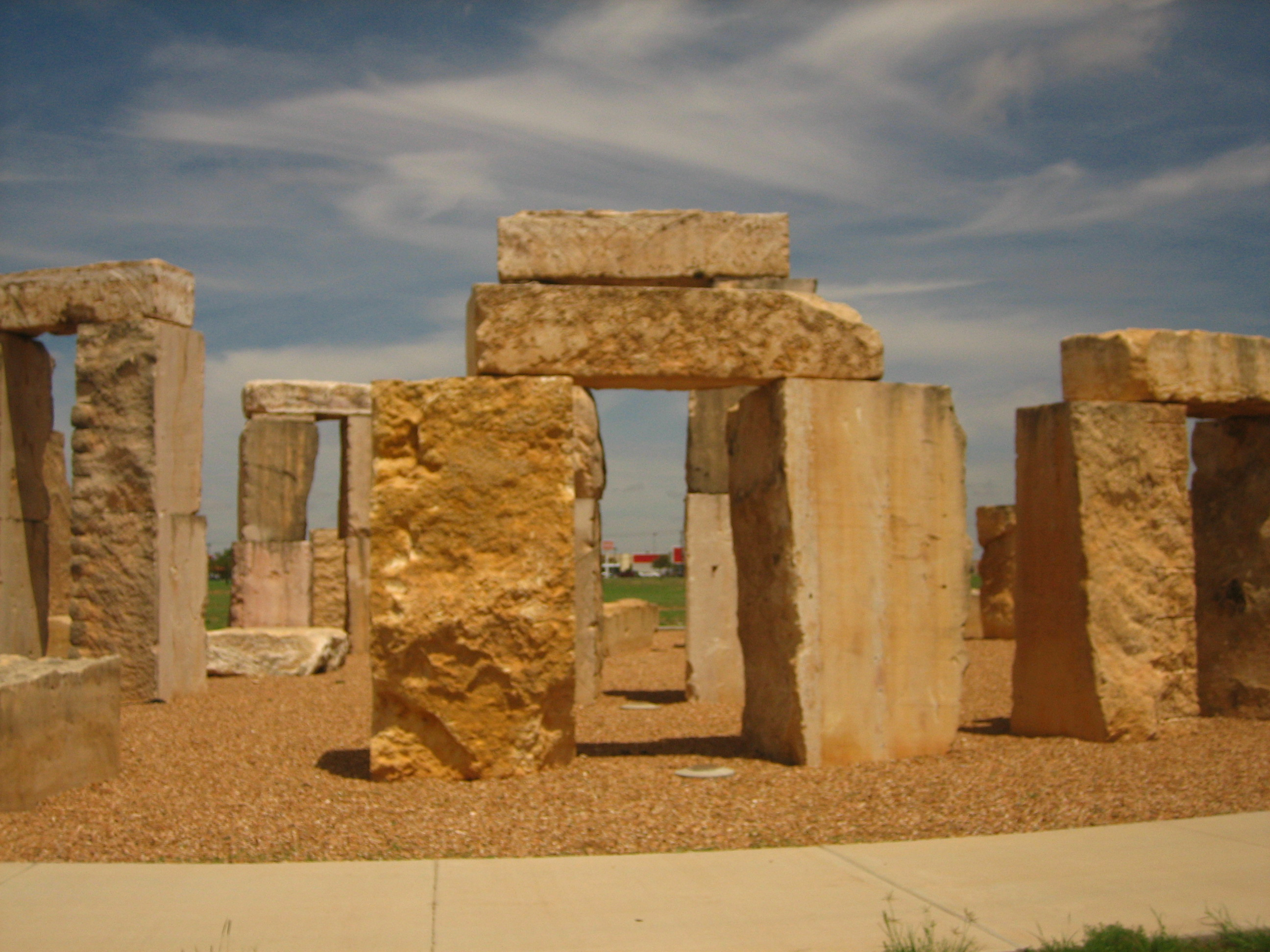
Stonehenge replica on campus of the University of Texas of the Permian Basin in Odessa

=== Australia and New Zealand ===
- The only astronomically aligned, full-scale, "exact" replica of (a pristine) Stonehenge in natural stone (granite) is Esperance Stonehenge at Esperance, Western Australia. It cost over A$250,000 to build. Some of the blocks weigh more than 50 tonnes.
- Stonehenge Aotearoa, in the Wairarapa region of New Zealand, is a modern adaptation aligned with the astronomy seen from the Antipodes. It was built by the Phoenix Astronomical Society from wood and sprayed concrete.
- A full-scale replica in sandstone was started in the rural township of Buckland in Tasmania in the first years of the 21st century, but was demolished by order of the municipal authorities. It did not have the necessary planning approval from the local council.

=== North America ===
- The Maryhill Stonehenge: A full-size concrete replica of Stonehenge, as it would have been originally built, saw construction commence and had its original dedication on 4 July 1918. Built in Maryhill, Washington by Sam Hill, it was the first monument in the United States to honour the dead of World War I, and specifically soldiers from Klickitat County, Washington who had died in the still on-going war. The altar stone is aligned to the astronomical horizon, rather than the sunrise on the Summer Solstice, resulting in a three-degree difference between it and Stonehenge. The true horizon for the replica is also obscured by the surrounding topography, which, combined with the latitude difference between it and Stonehenge, further complicates the reliability of the replica as an astronomical calendar. Hill, a Quaker pacifist, relied on the contemporary archaeological interpretation of Stonehenge as a site of human sacrifice and thus constructed the replica as a reminder that "we are [still] sacrificing the blood of our youth to the gods of war." The monument was originally located in the centre of Maryhill, which later burned down leaving only the Stonehenge replica. There was a second formal dedication of the monument upon its completion on 30 May 1929.
- There is a full-scale, limestone replica of Stonehenge on private property just northeast of Fortine, Montana, owned by inventor Jim Smith.
- A Stonehenge replica is located on the campus of the University of Texas of the Permian Basin in Odessa, Ector County, US. About twenty stone blocks, similar in size, shape, and appearance to the ancient Stonehenge, were unveiled in the summer of 2004.
- Foamhenge is a full-size, astronomically aligned Stonehenge made out of foam in Virginia, US.
- Bamahenge is a full-size, astronomically-aligned fiberglass replica of Stonehenge located in Baldwin County, Alabama, US.
- Missouri S&T has a half-scale replica built from solid granite located on campus.

=== Other ===
- British Foamhenge, a full-size, correctly aligned replica made from carpet tubes and polystyrene, was constructed for a UK TV programme titled "Stonehenge Live", broadcast in June 2005. The positions of each stone were accurately plotted using RTK GPS, which has centimetric accuracy. The replica quickly became known as "Foamhenge". It was removed soon after filming, and the "stones" placed in storage.

== Less accurate replicas ==
=== Europe ===
- Bavarian Strawhenge; a full-size replica, was assembled in Kemnath in Bavaria in 2003 from 350 bales of straw and used as a music venue.
- In the late 1970s, in Glasgow, an astronomically aligned stone circle was built in Sighthill Park.
- Tankhenge existed in the border zone of Berlin in the early 1990s after the collapse of the Wall. It was constructed from three ex-Soviet armoured personnel carriers.
- At the 2007 Glastonbury Festival, England, graffiti artist Banksy constructed a "Stonehenge" made from portable toilets.
- Achill-henge is a 2011 concrete structure on Achill Island, off the northwest coast of Ireland.
- In 2012, British artist Jeremy Deller created a life-size inflatable bouncy castle-style replica of Stonehenge titled 'Sacrilege' which first appeared in Greenwich Park, London and other parks in the capital; the interactive artwork has since toured nationally and internationally.
- Bladehenge is the name of a Charlotte Moreton sculpture located at Solstice Park, Amesbury, 2 miles from Stonehenge, England. The final piece of the "Solstice Park Sculptures", it is inspired by aeronautical forms of propellers and turbine, with three twisting steel monoliths designed to recall Stonehenge. It was installed in 2013.
- Steel Henge, which is in fact made using iron ingots, at Centenary Riverside Park, Rotherham, Yorkshire, England.

=== North America ===
- Carhenge was constructed from vintage American cars near Alliance, Nebraska by the artist Jim Reinders in 1987.
- The Georgia Guidestones were sometimes referred to as an "American Stonehenge".
- Canadian Strawhenge is in Ontario.
- Phonehenge is made of old-fashioned British telephone booths and is located at Freestyle Music Park in Myrtle Beach, South Carolina.
- Phonehenge West was an unrelated folk art construction in Los Angeles County, California, eventually demolished by authorities for building code violations.
- Mudhenge was erected for the 1996 Burning Man Festival.
- Munfordville Stonehenge, built by a local stonemason in Kentucky and set up along compass lines.
- Twinkiehenge, another Burning Man replica, constructed in 2001 out of Twinkies.
- Stonehenge II in Texas is a concrete sculpture inspired by the original.
- The Clarke Memorial Fountain, also nicknamed Stonehenge, is a war memorial on the campus of the University of Notre Dame.
- Stroudhenge: East Stroudsburg University, in East Stroudsburg, Pennsylvania, has a small replica located on its campus called "Stroudhenge".
- Mystical Horizons, located near Carbury, North Dakota, consists of six granite walls of varying heights that are intended to represent a 21st-century design. It functions as a working solar calendar. It was built in 2005.
- Fridgehenge: another modern take on Stonehenge once existed outside of Santa Fe, New Mexico, constructed out of junked refrigerators, known as 'Fridgehenge'. The structure was created by the artist Adam Jonas Horowitz. It no longer exists: all fridges have been removed after a complaint, confirmed on 5 August 2008.
- Truckhenge, "an eclectic combination of farm, salvage & recycled art ..... consists of 6 antique trucks jutting out of the ground - reminiscent of England's Stonehenge", Topeka, Kansas
- Ponyhenge, located in Lincoln, Massachusetts, consists of a variety of toy rocking horses often arranged in a circular formation.

=== Other ===
- Stonehenge microstructure: in 2004, scientists from the National University of Singapore created the smallest 3D replica of Stonehenge. Measuring only 80 micrometres in diameter, the Stonehenge microstructure was created by a process called silicon micromachining which uses a high-energy proton beam writer to produce 3-D microshapes and structures of high structural accuracy on the surface of materials such as silicon.
- In 1995, Graeme Cairns of Hamilton, New Zealand, built a replica of Stonehenge out of 41 refrigerators at a farm in Gordonton.
- Hanazono Central Park (花園中央公園, south of Hanazono Rugby Stadium, 1 Chome-1-1 松原南 Higashiosaka, Osaka, Japan, has a Stonehenge type pedestrian park feature.

== Other replicas ==
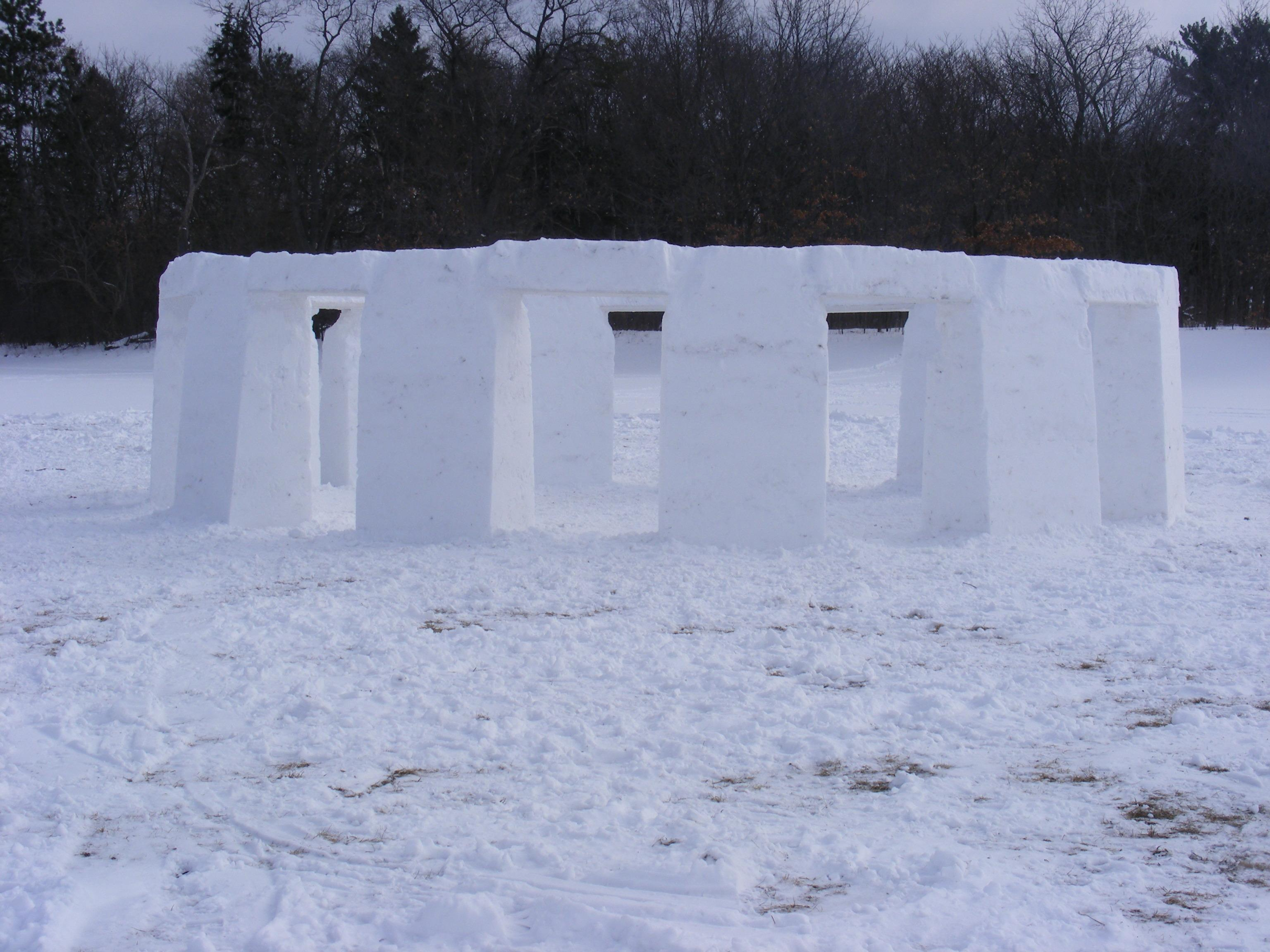
Snowhenge: 6.5 feet (2.0 m) tall and 30 feet (9.1 m) in diameter, consisting of nearly 1,000 cubic feet (28 m^{3}) of packed snow

The rock band Black Sabbath had a Stonehenge stage set for the 1983–1984 Born Again tour that ended up being too large to fit in most venues. This was parodied in the film This is Spinal Tap, when the band orders a Stonehenge set but it arrives in miniature due to a confusion between feet and inches.

In 1984, US artist Richard Fleischner constructed an abstract Stonehenge-like series of granite blocks at the University of California, San Diego as part of the Stuart Collection called The La Jolla Project. It is affectionately known as Stonehenge by students and faculty.

In 2005, the archaeological television programme Time Team created a replica of a timber circle located near Woodhenge as part of the Stonehenge Riverside Project.

In February 2010, Peter Salisbury, founder of the Michigan Druids, created a 1/3 scale replica of Stonehenge, made of snow, at the MacKay Jaycees Family Park in Grand Rapids, Michigan. It was named Snowhenge.

Muchołapka, a 10 metres tall dodecagonal concrete ring structure with a diameter of 30 metres, which was built during World War II near Ludwikowice Kłodzkie, Lower Silesia, Poland, is nicknamed "Hitler's Stonehenge". It was presumably the base of a cooling tower, but some people claim it was built for testing advanced aircraft.

== Comparable archaeological sites ==
A henge near Stonehenge containing concentric rings of postholes for standing timbers, discovered in 1922, was named Woodhenge by its excavators because of similarities with Stonehenge. The name woodhenge is also used for a series of timber circles found at the Native American site of Cahokia (Cahokia Woodhenge). The timber Seahenge in Norfolk was named as such by journalists writing about its discovery in 1998.

In November 2004, a circle of postholes 7 metres (23 ft) in diameter was found in Russia and publicised as the Russian Stonehenge. Other prehistoric sites elsewhere, often also with proposed astronomical alignments, are often described by journalists as being that region's "answer to Stonehenge".

In May 2006, reports emerged of an "Amazon Stonehenge" near Calçoene, 390 kilometres from Macapá, the capital of Amapá state, near Brazil's border with French Guiana. It comprises 127 stones, possibly forming astronomical observing points.

America's Stonehenge is an unrelated and controversial site in the U.S. state of New Hampshire.

== Gallery ==
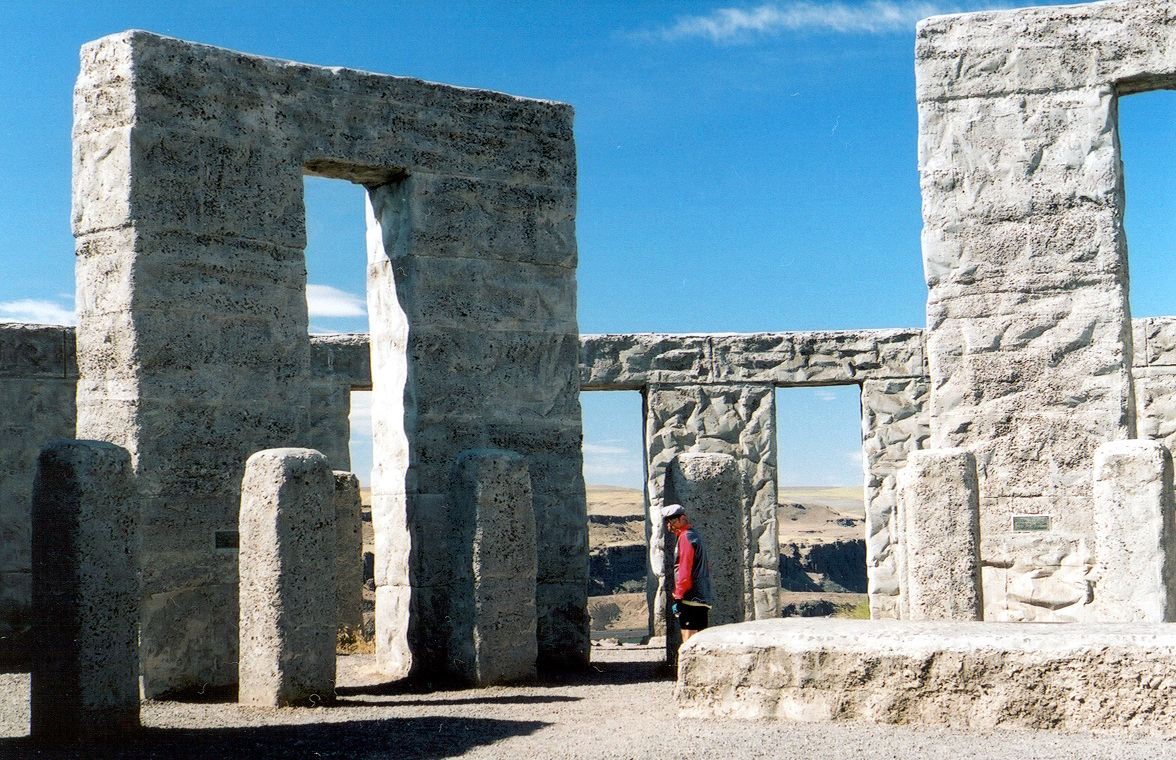
Replica at Maryhill, Washington

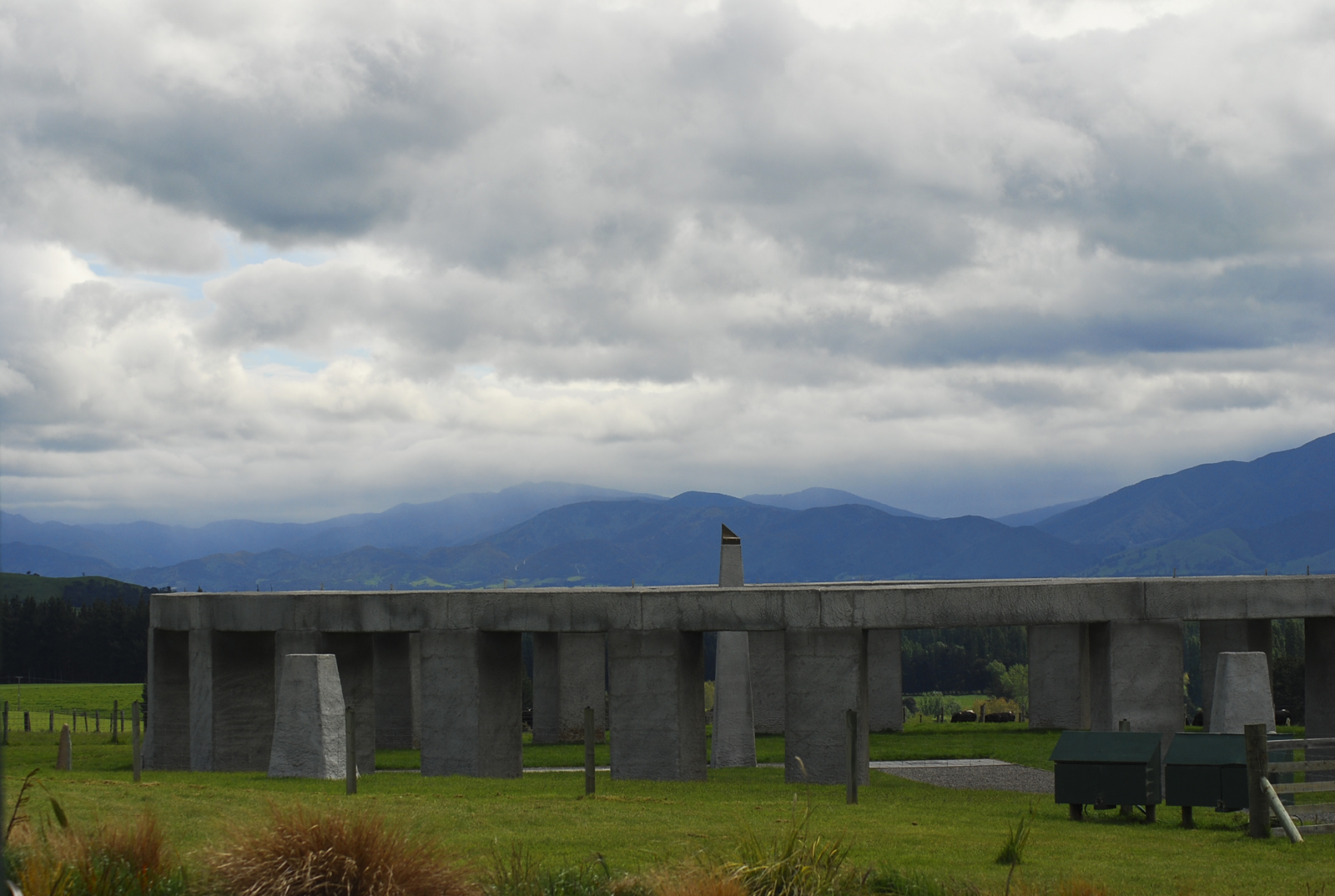
Detail of the Stonehenge Aotearoa exterior

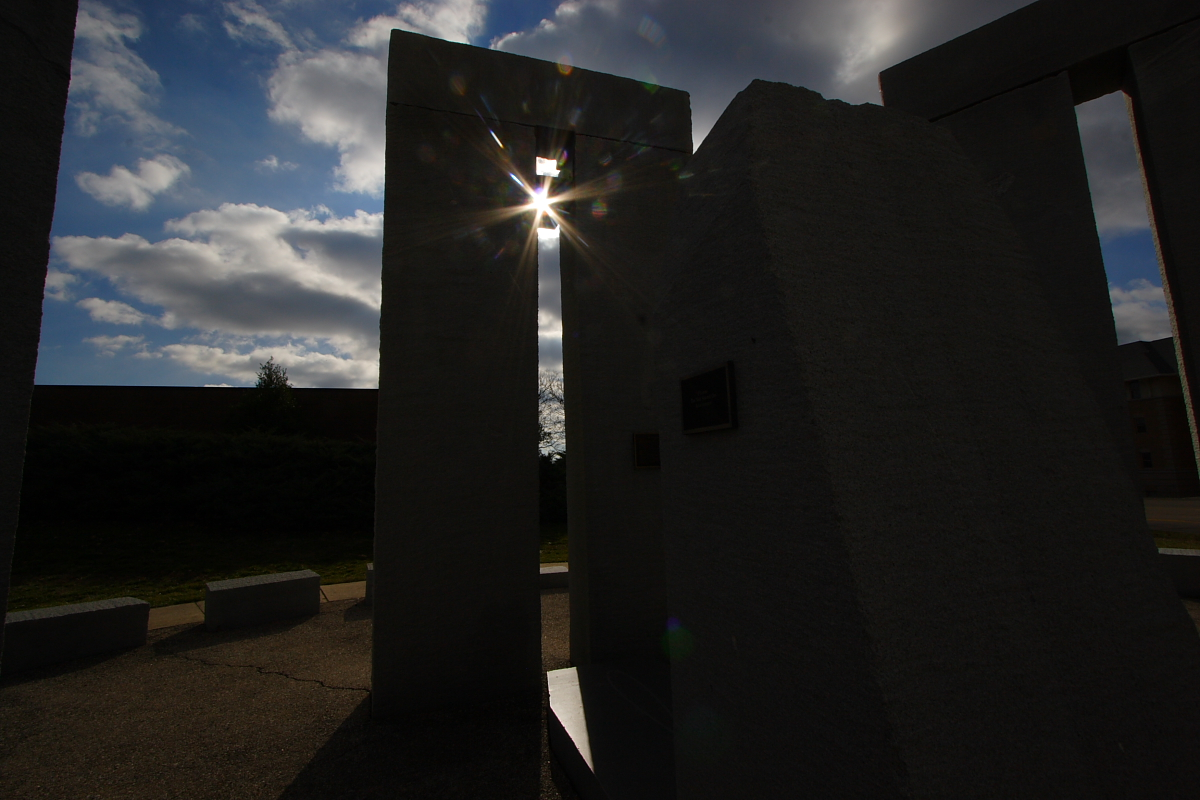
Missouri S&T's half-scale replica

== See also ==
- Manhattanhenge, a solar phenomenon in New York City, named in reference to Stonehenge
- MIThenge, a solar phenomenon at the Massachusetts Institute of Technology
