= Dinosaur Kingdom II =

Tourist attraction in Natural Bridge, Virginia

Coordinates: 37.6309°N 79.5408°W

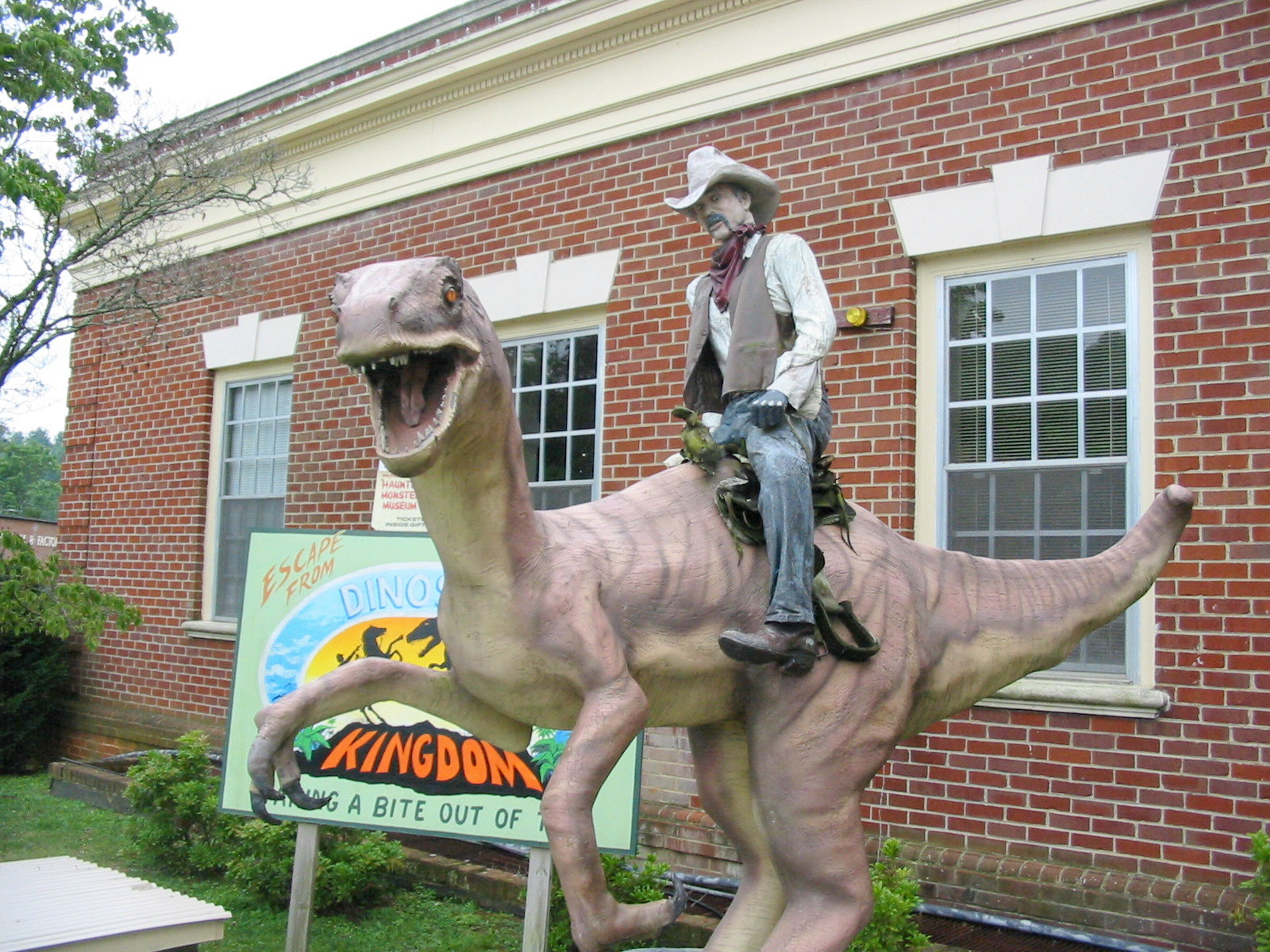
A sculpture outside the gift shop

Dinosaur Kingdom II (also called Escape From Dinosaur Kingdom) is a tourist attraction in Natural Bridge, Virginia, consisting of statues which depict a dinosaur attack on the Union Army. The park contains thirty fiberglass dinosaur statues, a smaller number of Union soldiers, and several other characters, including Abraham Lincoln and a gorilla in a cowboy hat. Dinosaur Kingdom, which opened in 2005, is the work of local artist Mark Cline, who also created nearby Foamhenge.

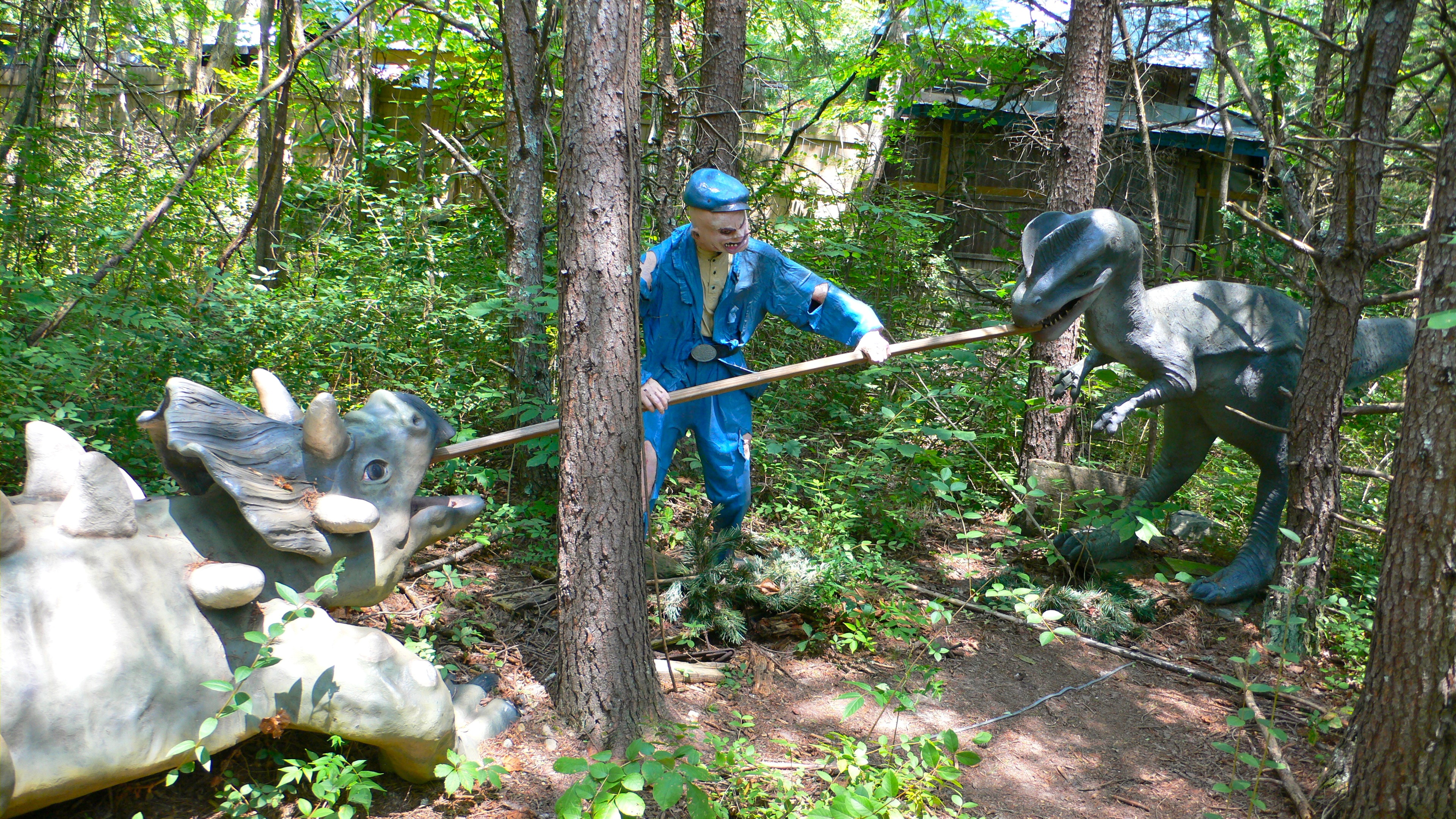
A Union soldier breaks up a fight between a dilophosaurus and some ceratopsian

The park's statues are built around the premise that paleontologists discovered dinosaurs in Virginia in 1863; when the Union Army attempted to use the dinosaurs as weapons, the dinosaurs turned on them. Cline originally planned to have the dinosaurs besiege Pancho Villa's army, but chose to use the Union Army instead to win local favor, claiming "people still fight the Civil War down here". Cline had desired to build dinosaur statues ever since stopping at the Dinosaur Land park in White Post, Virginia in his youth; his inspiration for Dinosaur Kingdom's theme came from the movie The Valley of Gwangi, in which cowboys discovered living dinosaurs in a Mexican valley.

According to Cline, Northerners have never complained about playing the villain in the attraction; he plans to open a similar park at Gettysburg reenacting Pickett's Charge with dinosaurs, in which the Confederates will be attacked.
