= Dinosaur Land (Virginia) =

Tourist attraction in White Post, Virginia

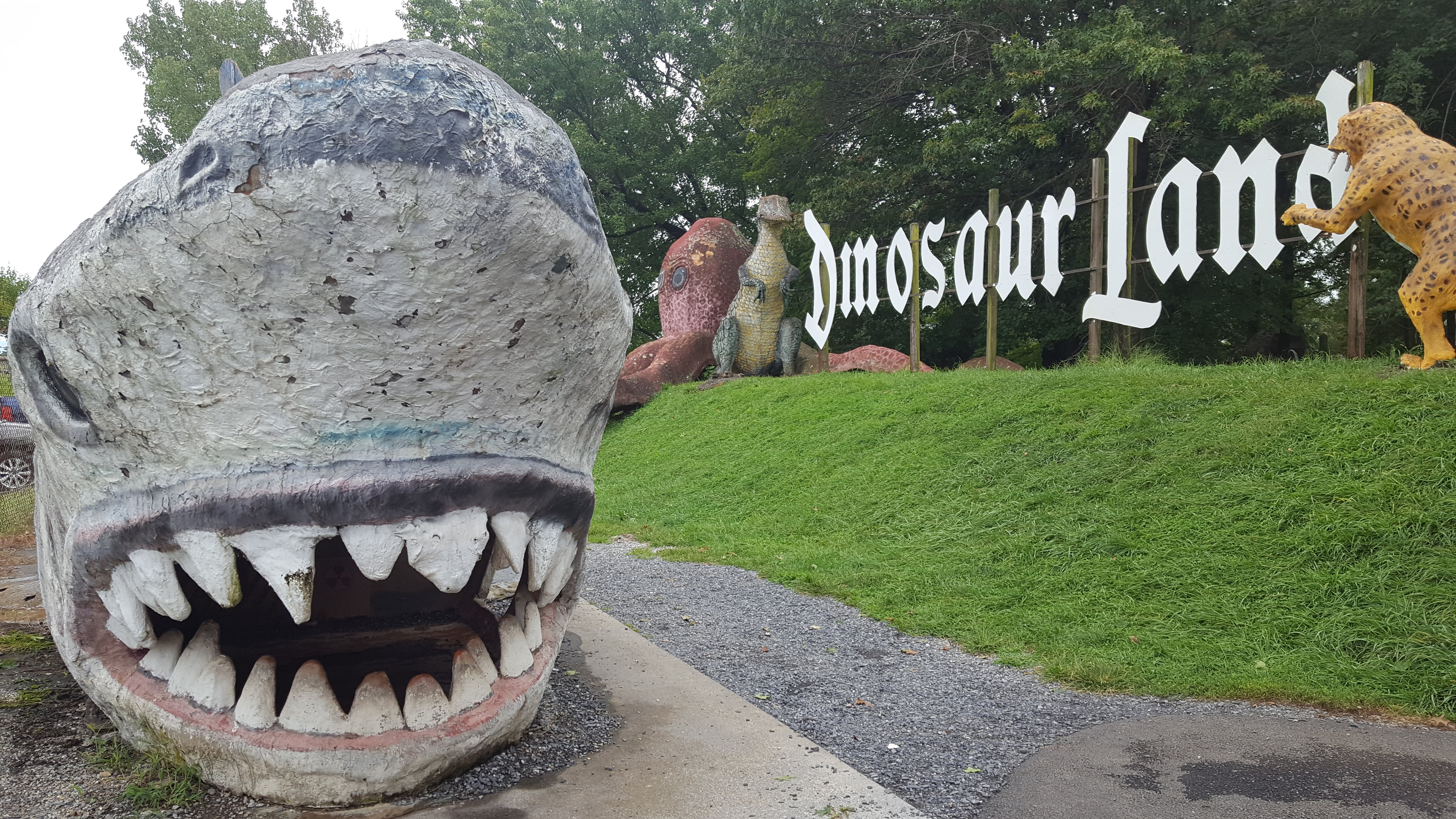
- Interactive map of Dinosaur Land
- Location: White Post, Virginia, United States
- Coordinates: 39.059866°N 78.139881°W
- Status: Operating
- Opened: 1963
- Owner: Joann Leight and Barbara Seldon
- Area: 2 acres (0.81 ha)

Dinosaur Land is a tourist attraction in White Post, Virginia established in 1963. The park has more than fifty dinosaur statues; the differing styles of the recreations demonstrate changing anatomical knowledge and aesthetic design over the decades.

== Description and history ==
Dinosaur Land was started around 1963 by Joseph Geraci as a gift shop called "Rebel Korner"; the name was changed to Dinosaur Land in 1967. Geraci admired other dinosaur sculptures created by James Q. Sidwell, a dinosaur replica designer for the Field Museum of Natural History in Chicago, and commissioned Sidwell to create sculptures for a gift shop. The site was started with five dinosaurs created with wooden frames covering wire mesh and fiberglass; new sculptures were added regularly throughout the years. Several of the original dinosaurs were covered with fur and had moving parts, such as a woolly mammoth statue with a moving trunk and flapping ears; those elements have been removed as they were difficult to maintain.

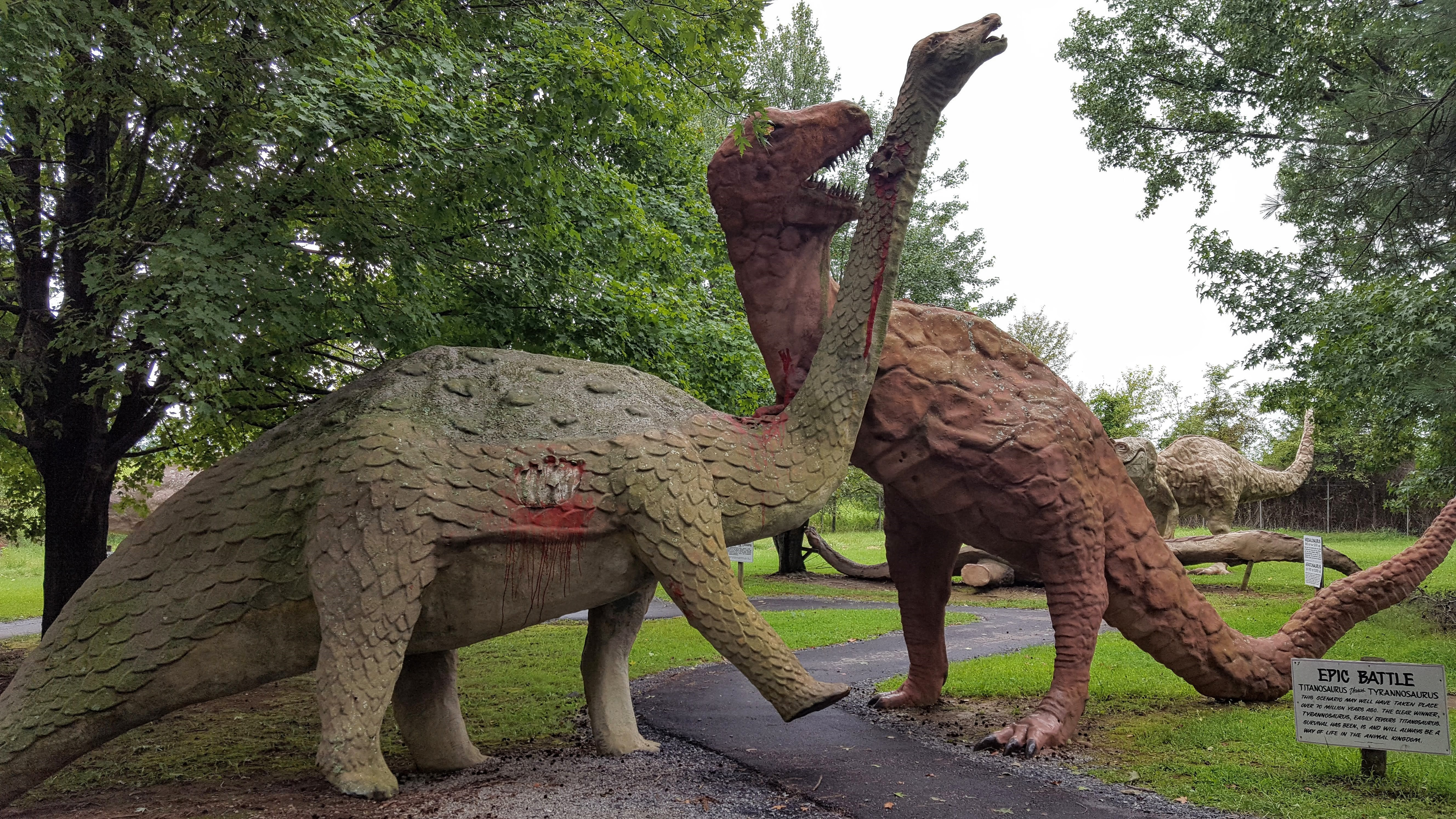
Sculptures of a Titanosaurus and a Tyrannosaurus engaged in an "epic battle"

About 35 of the dinosaurs on display were created by Sidwell. The park's newer, more scientifically accurate dinosaurs have been created by Mark Cline, creator of nearby roadside attractions Dinosaur Kingdom II and Foamhenge. The site also includes non-dinosaur figures, such as a 70-foot purple octopus, a 60-foot-long shark, and a King Kong statue which provides a photo opportunity with visitors standing in its oversized hand. Figures representing horror creatures such as Dracula and the Mummy were removed after they proved too frightening for younger children.

When Geraci died in 1987, his daughters continued to run the site. As of 2015, two of his daughters, Joann Leight and Barbara Seldon, were running the business, with members of the extended family taking roles in maintaining the site and running the gift shop.

The park's gift shop sells educational material and toys, including dinosaur memorabilia; the site has been criticized by some visitors for selling Confederate flags and figurines featuring blackface.

== See also ==
- List of dinosaur parks
