= George W. Barber =

American businessman and philanthropist (1940–2026)

- Born: September 11, 1940
- Died: February 15, 2026 (aged 85)
- Occupations: Business executive, philanthropist
- Parent: George Warren Barber

George Warren Barber Jr. (September 11, 1940 – February 15, 2026) was an American businessman, real estate developer and philanthropist from Alabama.

== Early life ==
Barber's father, George Warren Barber, founded Barber Dairies in the 1930s. It became the largest dairy company in Alabama. His father promoted the use of pasteurized milk in the United States.

== Career ==
Barber was a racecar driver. Later, he was a real estate developer and served as the Chairman of Barber Dairies. In 2012, artist Mark Cline, commissioned by Barber, designed and built the Bamahenge monument. It was installed at George's Barber Marina. In 1998, he sold the family business to Dean Foods. In 2003, he established Barber Motorsports Park in Birmingham, Alabama.

== Motorcycle collection ==
Barber started collecting motorcycles in the 1970s. It is "the world's largest collection of motorcycles," and it is in the Guinness Book of Records with more than 1,400 motorcycles covering all timelines from vintage to modern. He was inducted into the Motorcycle Hall of Fame in 2014.

== Philanthropy ==
Barber donated approximately $54 million toward the purchase of the Leeds, Alabama land that became Barber Motorsports Park, and contributed in excess of $125 million in total to develop and gift the park to the Birmingham community. He supported more than 90 organizations across Alabama and underwrote over 500 college scholarships in communities served by Barber Dairies. He served on the board of the Forever Wild Land Trust and founded the Birmingham chapter of the Coastal Conservation Association.

== Death ==
Barber died on February 15, 2026 in Birmingham, aged 85, after a brief illness.
