= The Valley of Gwangi =

1969 film by Jim O'Connolly

- Theatrical release poster by Frank McCarthy
- Directed by: Jim O'Connolly
- Written by: William Bast; Julian More; Willis H. O'Brien
- Produced by: Charles H. Schneer
- Starring: James Franciscus; Gila Golan; Richard Carlson; Laurence Naismith; Freda Jackson; Gustavo Rojo
- Cinematography: Erwin Hillier
- Edited by: Henry Richardson; Selwyn Petterson
- Music by: Jerome Moross
- Production company: Charles H. Schneer Productions
- Distributed by: Warner Bros.-Seven Arts
- Release dates: June 11, 1969 (Detroit); September 3, 1969 (New York City)
- Running time: 96 minutes
- Country: United States
- Language: English

The Valley of Gwangi is a 1969 American fantasy Western film produced by Charles H. Schneer and Ray Harryhausen, directed by Jim O'Connolly, written by William Bast, and starring James Franciscus, Richard Carlson, and Gila Golan.

Creature stop-motion effects were by Harryhausen, the last dinosaur-themed film that he animated. He had inherited the film project from his mentor Willis O'Brien, responsible for the effects in the original King Kong (1933). O'Brien had planned to make The Valley of Gwangi decades earlier but died in 1962 before it could be realized. Producer Charles H. Schneer called it "probably the least of the movies Ray and I made together."

== Plot ==
In early 20th century Mexico, T.J. Breckenridge hosts a rodeo. Her former lover, Tuck Kirby, a former stuntman working for Buffalo Bill's Wild West Show, wants to buy her out. He is followed by Lope, a Mexican boy who intends to join the rodeo on a quest for fame and fortune. T.J. is not interested in Tuck, who is still attracted to her. T.J. accepts Tuck when he saves Lope from a bull.

T.J. has an advantage she hopes will boost attendance at her show – a horse called El Diablo. Tuck meets British paleontologist Horace Bromley, who is working in a nearby Mexican desert. Bromley shows Tuck fossilized horse tracks, and Tuck notes their similarity to El Diablo's feet. Tuck sneaks Bromley into the circus for a look at El Diablo, which Bromley declares to be an Eohippus.

The horse came from a place known as the Forbidden Valley. Romani Tia Zorina claims that the horse is cursed, and demands that it be returned. Later, she and the other Romani collaborate with Bromley to steal El Diablo and release it in the valley. Bromley hopes to follow the horse to its home in search of other prehistoric specimens. Carlos, a former member of the Romani tribe now working for T.J.'s circus, walks in on the theft and tries to stop it, but is knocked out.

Tuck arrives just as the Romani leave. Carlos sees him as he is regaining consciousness. Tuck notices that the horse is missing, and follows Bromley. T.J. and her crew discover Carlos, who claims that Tuck stole El Diablo for himself. Carlos, T.J., and the others decide to follow Tuck and Bromley into the valley.

In the Forbidden Valley, Tuck, T.J., and the rest of the group gather and discover why the valley is said to be cursed when a Pteranodon swoops down and snatches Lope. However, due to the extra weight, it falls back to the ground. After Carlos kills the Pteranodon, they spot an Ornithomimus, which they try to capture. It is eventually killed by Gwangi, an Allosaurus, which chases Bromley and the rest of the group. However, a Styracosaurus appears and drives Gwangi away, while Lope reveals Carlos's lie.

Gwangi pursues the group to their base camp. They try to rope him, but he breaks free when the Styracosaurus reappears. Gwangi kills the Styracosaurus and later kills Carlos, but is knocked out by a rockslide while trying to exit the valley in pursuit of the rest of the group.

Securing the creature with ropes, Tuck and the other men in the group take Gwangi back to town to be put on display in T.J.'s show. On the opening day, a dwarfed Romani who works for Tia Zorina sneaks in and begins to unlock Gwangi's cage to free him, but is killed when Gwangi breaks free. The crowd flees as Gwangi attacks, and Tia Zorina is trampled to death. Bromley is crushed by a broken piece of the cage, and Gwangi kills an Asian elephant and a few cowboys before rampaging through the town. Tuck, accompanied by T.J. and Lope, tries to hide the crowd in a cathedral, but Gwangi breaks in. Tuck urges the crowd to leave through a back exit, leaving himself inside with Gwangi, T.J. and Lope.

Gwangi tries to eat them, but is distracted when the cathedral's organ sounds. Tuck wounds him and throws a torch onto the floor near it, setting the building on fire. Tuck and the others escape, leaving Gwangi trapped in the collapsing building. Shrieking as he is burned alive, Gwangi is finally crushed to death by the debris. Lope sheds tears for the dinosaur as he, Tuck, T.J. and a crowd watch the cathedral burn.

== Cast ==
- James Franciscus as Tuck
- Gila Golan as T.J.
- Richard Carlson as Champ
- Laurence Naismith as Professor Bromley
- Freda Jackson as Tia Zorina
- Gustavo Rojo as Carlos
- Mario De Barros as Bean (as Mario de Barros)
- Dennis Kilbane as Rowdy
- Jose Burgos as the Dwarf
- Curtis Arden as Lope

== Production ==
=== Development ===
Ray Harryhausen presented Gwangi to film producer Charles H. Schneer in the mid-1960s, hoping to revive a project started by Harryhausen’s mentor Willis O'Brien from a screenplay originally called Valley of the Mists. O'Brien, responsible for the pioneering special effects in King Kong (1933), envisioned a film with a similar premise as Kong, following a tragic monster captured then released into civilization. It was a co-production with RKO Pictures and Colonial Pictures; President of RKO George J. Schaefer agreed to finance the film, providing O’Brien with a $552,000 budget. O’Brien anticipated his stop-motion effects would be complimented well by director Ernest B. Schoedsack’s live action. Marcel Delgado sculpted several prototypes of the film’s monster: an Allosaurus named “Gwangi”. Unfortunately for O’Brien, due to executive changes at RKO and wartime constraints, the project was scrapped in 1942, and no filming took place.

Despite the project’s demise, O’Brien reappropriated ideas from it for subsequent films. Mighty Joe Young (1949) and The Beast of Hollow Mountain (1956) both incorporated similar thematic elements; the latter film acknowledged O’Brien with a co-credit for the screenplay and utilized the armature from the original Gwangi puppet.

In the late 1960s, Ray Harryhausen and producer Charles H. Schneer decided to reunite after several years of making films apart. Harryhausen suggested reviving two old O'Brien projects, War Eagles, which had been developed for MGM, and Valley of the Mists. Schneer did not see how they could get a script out of War Eagles, but was enthusiastic about the Valley script and bought the rights from O'Brien's widow. Although O'Brien was the creator of the original story, an on-screen credit for him was not included in The Valley of Gwangi .

Schneer had the script rewritten by William Bast and offered the project to Columbia, who had made all Schneer's previous collaborations with Harryhausen. The studio turned it down but Warner Bros agreed to finance. James O'Connelly signed to direct.

Harryhausen said they decided to keep the story's early 20th Century time period to eliminate the "cliches about the army moving in with tanks and missiles."

Gwangi was described in O'Brien's original script as an Allosaurus, although O'Brien apparently did not draw much distinction between Allosaurus and Tyrannosaurus, as he also referred to the Tyrannosaurus in the original King Kong (modeled by Marcel Delgado) as an "Allosaurus". According to Ray Harryhausen, his own version of Gwangi (and O'Brien's Gwangi too, as well as Delgado's Tyrannosaurus) was based on a Charles R. Knight painting of a Tyrannosaurus – one of the two most famous paintings by Knight, and one that is instantly recognizable by the eye being placed too far forward on the skull (this was based on concurrently incomplete skeletal remains and the eye was mistakenly placed in one of the antorbital fenestrae), as well as ultimately and incorrectly portraying Tyrannosaurus with a three-fingered hand. This famous Tyrannosaurus image is also reflected in Harryhausen's "Rhedosaurus" in The Beast from 20,000 Fathoms. In an interview featured on the Valley of Gwangi DVD, Harryhausen said "We sometimes called it an Allosaurus... They're both meat eaters, they're both Tyrants... one was just a bit larger than the other." Gwangi was scaled to be 14 feet tall, within the size range of an average adult Tyrannosaurus (although not the largest), and at the upper limit of the largest Allosaurus specimens.

=== Special effects ===
The Valley of Gwangi was the last dinosaur-themed film that Harryhausen animated, and he made much use of his experience in depicting extinct animals from his earlier films. Close to a year was spent on the special effects (there were more than 300 'Dynamation' cuts in the film, a record number for Harryhausen), with the roping of Gwangi being the most labor-intensive animated sequence. It was achieved by having the actors hold on to ropes tied to a "monster stick" that was in the back of a jeep. The jeep and stick when filmed with Gwangi are on a back rear projection plate and hidden by his body, and the portions of rope attached to his body are painted wires that are matched with the real ropes. The coordination of Gwangi's animation with live actors on horseback (and the horses appearing to react to Gwangi) was particularly difficult to film, and the source of an editorial lapse in a following scene. Gwangi bites through the ropes around his neck when first lassoed and later has his jaws roped together when unconscious. However, he is then shown being transported in a cart again held only by ropes around his neck but with jaws now un-bound.

The first animated sequence in the film is a diving act done by T.J. and her horse. Because it was decided that it was too risky to have a rider and horse jump off a 40-foot (12-meter) high platform into a tank of water, a model horse and rider were used. After tempting Gila Golan's horse to jump from a mock-up platform onto a trampoline, the film cut to an animated model suspended on wires (actually, it was just a tiny toy horse and rider bought in a toy store). The splash was real, triggered by an electric charge inside the tank.

After local Romani steal the Eohippus, it is released back into the Forbidden Valley. For all the scenes where the cowboys are chasing the creature, the animated model was used. However, in one long shot, a baby goat was used instead because the model would have been too small.

The pterosaurs were mistakenly given bat's wings (with elongate fingers supporting the membrane; pterosaurs had one finger forming the wing's leading edge but none on the membrane). The wings appear to mimic those of a pterosaur from an earlier Harryhausen film, One Million Years B.C. (1966). Close-up sequences of the pterosaurs in Gwangi were provided by life-size models. For the scene when Lope is snatched from his horse by the Pteranodon, the boy was raised by wires painted out in the studio and Harryhausen animated the eight-inch-(20-centimeter) high model pterosaur to correspond with his movements. However, once the creature gets up to a certain altitude the real boy was replaced with a model which was used until he crawls away from the creature which is being killed by Carlos on the ground. Bromley the paleontologist correctly identifies it as a pterodactyl (the classification of pterosaurs that Pteranodon is a part of) while he is inspecting it on the ground.

The scene where Gwangi pounces on the Ornithomimus has been copied many times in dinosaur films, primarily in Jurassic Park, when the Tyrannosaurus pounces on the Gallimimus. The smaller dinosaur had never appeared on the film screen before and although its movements were unlikely it was one of Harryhausen's favorite sequences in the film. The battle between Gwangi and the Styracosaurus features battle moves, such as biting, stabbing, butting and pinning. After Gwangi is captured, he is wheeled back to town in a cart; and for several of the long shots of this scene the crew built and used a full-sized mock-up of Gwangi, again because an actual model would have been far too small.

Harryhausen originally planned to have used a real elephant in some of the scenes for the fight with Gwangi. This did not work out because he wanted to have used a 15-foot (5-meter) tall elephant (the world's biggest elephant was two feet shorter than this). So, the live 8-foot (2-meter) elephant was only used in the beginning when a woman is seen briefly riding on its back. For some of the elephant fight scenes, Harryhausen used the animation table as the bullring floor.

For Gwangi's death scene, a number of special effects were used. When the torch hits the ground near Gwangi, the flames are seen quickly developing and surrounding Gwangi. The flames were added in by double printing the camera. The outside of the burning church was a mixture of composites: the lower half was the real church photographed on location in Spain, and the upper, burning half was a miniature, again added in by double printing the camera.

The model of the Eohippus was supposed to have toes but appears to have regular hooves with 'toes' painted on (the sound effects of the animal moving also resemble hooves). The model of the Styracosaurus featured an inflatable air 'bladder' to simulate the animal breathing heavily after its combat with Gwangi (a feature first used in models made for much earlier films by Marcel Delgado).

Some of the models used in the film were reused model armatures from earlier films. Gwangi, the Ornithomimus and the Styracosaurus were all made from the Ceratosaurus, the Phorusrhacos and the Triceratops, who were stripped down and had their armatures modified for further use. The actual model of Gwangi was about 14 inches (36 cm) high and the Ornithomimus was about 5 inches (13 cm) high. A solid-latex, non-armatured model of Gwangi was also used for the scenes when he knocks himself out while trying to exit the valley in pursuit of the cowboys (but, Harryhausen was never pleased with this, as the solid model did not look right).

=== Casting ===
Actress Gila Golan was cast at the insistence of Warner Bros. Her Israeli accent was so strong that all of her lines were redubbed on the film by a voice actress.

Actor Laurence Naismith, who plays Professor Bromley, had earlier appeared in Harryhausen's Jason and the Argonauts as the shipbuilder Argos.

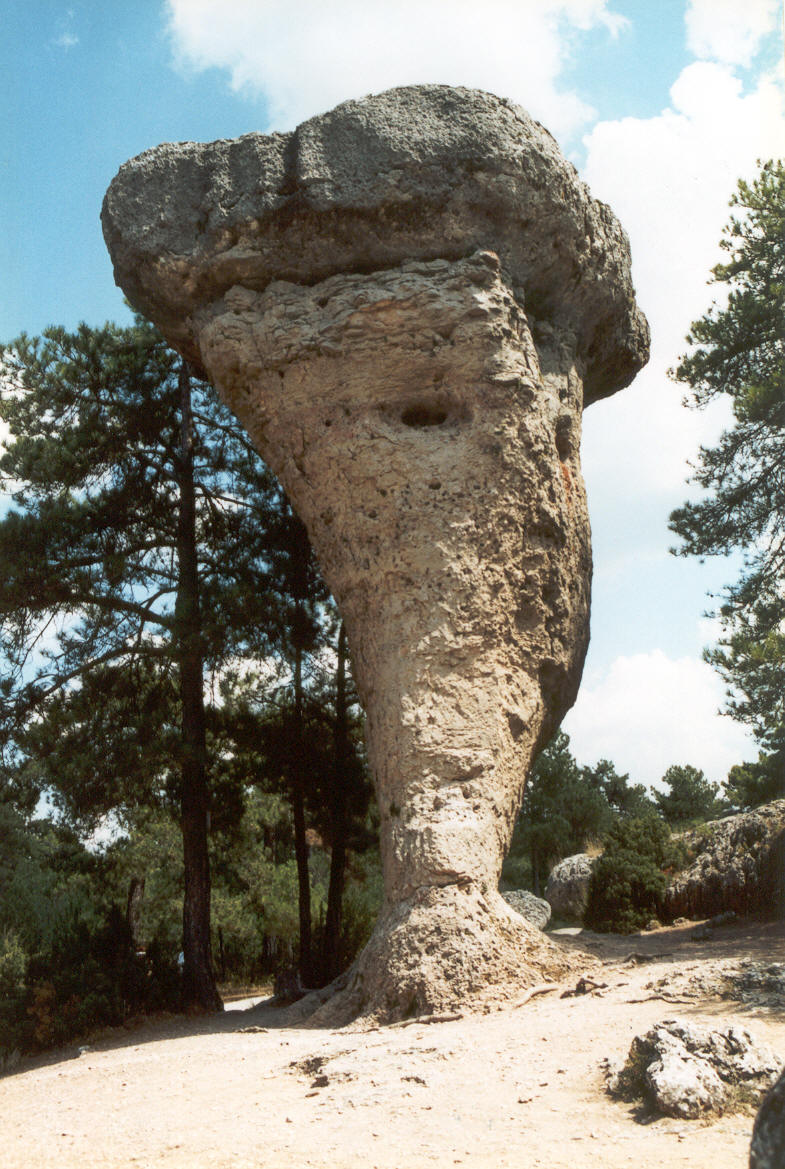
Mushroom rock in the "Ciudad Encantada" of Cuenca, where scenes of the titular Valley were shot.

==== Location shooting ====
The film was filmed in Almería and Cuenca, Spain. The bullring scenes were shot in Almería's Plaza de Toros and the finale at Cuenca's cathedral. Some scenes with dinosaurs like the Pteranodon scene or the fight between the Allosaurus and Styracosaurus were filmed in Almería, in Tabernas Desert. The unusual rock formations of Ciudad Encantada near Cuenca were used for the forbidden valley.

Schneer says the director "lost interest in the middle of shooting. I don't think he enjoyed it. He just didn't have his heart in it, when he was halfway through."

According to Bast, "the director was monumentally stupid. Charlie opted for someone who matched his own insensitivity. O’Connolly started tampering with the script as they were leaving. I thought, 'This is going to be a mess'."

== Reception ==
=== Box office ===
According to Harryhausen, "We got trapped in a change of management shuffle at Warner Bros. If only they had publicized it properly! They just dumped the picture on the market. A lot of people who would have loved it never got a chance to see it, never knew it was playing."

"The new administration didn't give it the kind of release I expected," said Schneer. "They didn't know how to market our type of picture as well as Columbia did. It was their money and their property, and they did what they wanted. I had no rapport with that new management. There was nothing I could do to change their minds."

=== Critical reception ===
Schneer later said he "wasn't very keen about" the film. "Because of the subject matter and the period in which it was set, it just didn't have the same appeal to me that our other pictures had. The central image of the cowboys roping the dinosaur was imaginative, but it didn't hold up for feature length."

On the review aggregator website Rotten Tomatoes, 73% of 11 critics' reviews are positive, with an average rating of 5.6/10.

== Comic book adaptation ==
- Dell Movie Classic: The Valley of Gwangi (December 1969)

== Legacy ==
By the time of the film's release, interest in monster movies of this type was waning. Management at Warner Bros. Pictures and Warner Bros.-Seven Arts also changed, and the film was released with little promotional effort on a double-bill with a biker film; it thus missed its target audience and was not as successful as earlier Harryhausen efforts. It has since become a cult classic.

Among the critics, The New York Times called it a "generally run-of-the-mill monster rally."

The scene where Gwangi suddenly appears from behind a hill and snatches the fleeing Ornithomimus in his jaws was later copied in Steven Spielberg’s big-budget dinosaur film, Jurassic Park.

During the 1980s hit TV series Scarecrow and Mrs. King, anytime a television was shown on in the series, The Valley of Gwangi was on the screen.

In episode 2–28 (2000) of the American version of the TV series Whose Line Is It Anyway?, the scene of Tuck fighting the pterodactyl was used for the green screen video during the Newsflash segment.

Artist Mark Cline's 2005 attraction Dinosaur Kingdom was inspired by The Valley of Gwangi.

Justin Parpan's 2007 children's read-aloud book, Gwango's Lonesome Trail (Red Cygnet Press, Inc., ISBN 1-60108-004-2) features a prehistoric dinosaur named "Gwango" roaming the contemporary American Southwest.

In the episode "The One Where Joey Speaks French" (2004) of the sitcom Friends (1994), Ross Geller watches the film while in a hospital.

In the 2011 animated film, Scooby-Doo! Legend of the Phantosaur, during a night time chase scene through the town a movie theatre can be seen in the background playing two dinosaur-themed monster movies, The Valley of Gwangi (1969) and The Beast from 20,000 Fathoms (1953) [another Ray Harryhausen film from Warner Bros].

In July 2018, The Valley of Gwangi was shown at the Pickwick Theater in Park Ridge, Illinois as part of the G-Fest convention events going on in Rosemont, Illinois. Playing on a double-bill with another 1960's dinosaur fantasy film using stop-motion animation (albeit not by Harryhausen), Dinosaurus!.

== See also ==
- The Beast of Hollow Mountain, a similar 1956 sci-fi western film.
- Weird West
- List of films featuring dinosaurs
- List of stop-motion films
- Journey to the Beginning of Time

== Bibliography ==
- Swires, Steve (March 1990). "Merchant of the Magicks Part Three". Starlog. pp. 65–68, 71.
- Newsom, Ted (Spring 1995). "Dynamation Ray Harryhausen Part Two". Imagi Movies. Vol. 2, no. 3. pp. 14–28.
- Film Fantasy Scrapbook by Ray Harryhausen, 1972
- From the Land Beyond Beyond: The Making of the Movie Monsters You've Known and Loved – The Films of Willis O' Brien and Ray Harryhausen, by Jeff Rovin, 1977
- Ray Harryhausen: An Animated Life, by Ray Harryhausen and Tony Dalton, foreword by Ray Bradbury, 2003
- The Art of Ray Harryhausen, by Ray Harryhausen and Tony Dalton, foreword by Peter Jackson, 2005
- A Century of Model Animation: From Méliès to Aardman, by Ray Harryhausen and Tony Dalton, 2008
- Ray Harryhausen: A Life in Pictures, by Tony Dalton, foreword by George Lucas, final word by Ray Bradbury, 2010
- Ray Harryhausen's Fantasy Scrapbook, by Ray Harryhausen and Tony Dalton, foreword by John Landis, 2011
- Ray Harryhausen – Master of the Majicks, an exhaustive limited edition three-volume set of books by Mike Hankin showcasing Harryhausen and his films (a re-print is currently pending).
- Webber, Roy P. (2004). The Dinosaur Films of Ray Harryhausen. Forewords by Jim Aupperle and Bill Maylone. McFarland. ISBN 978-0-7864-6936-9. (A 2nd edition will be published in 2026.)
