= Gila Golan =

Israeli model and actress (born 1940)

Gila Golan גילה גולן
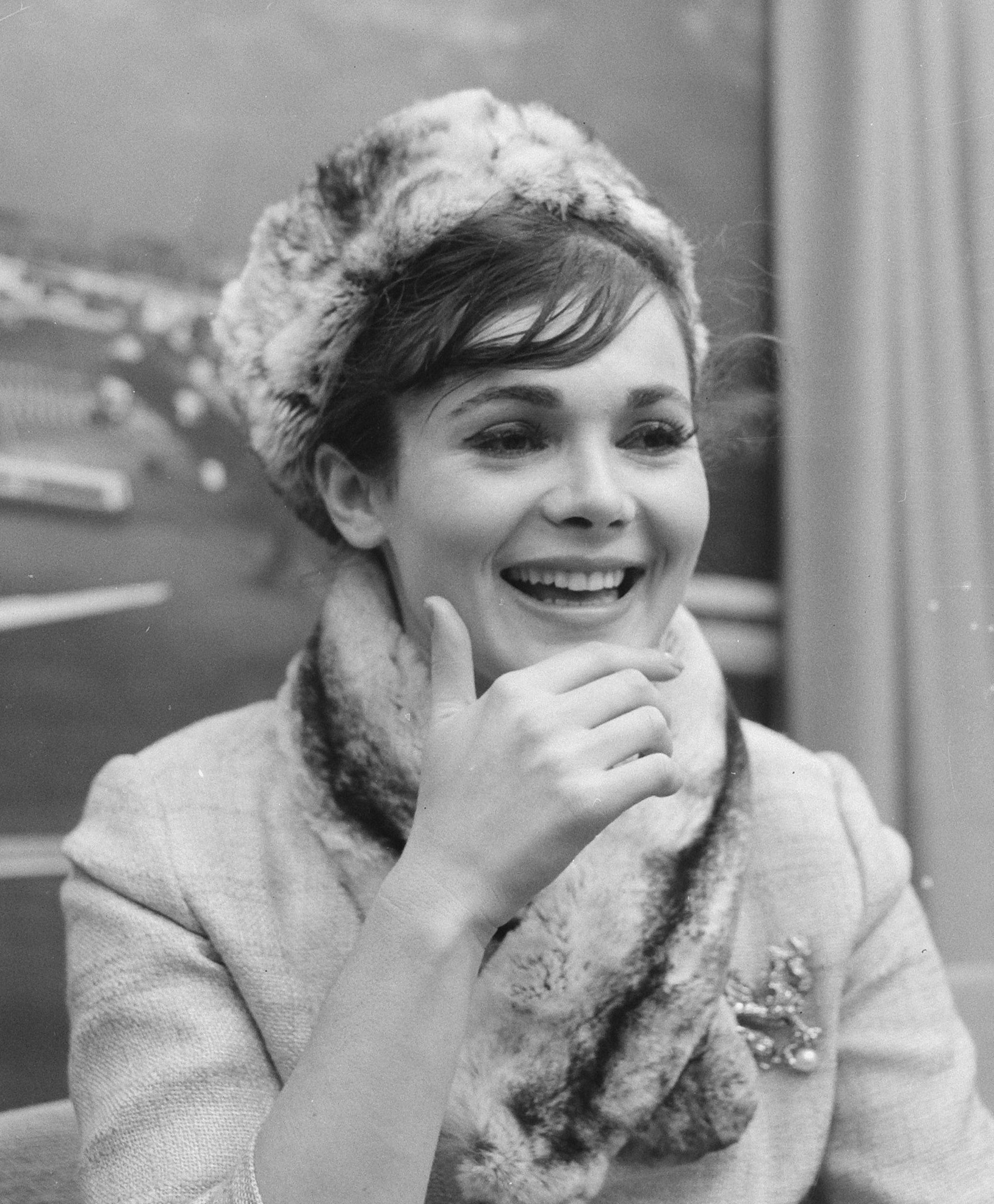
- Gila Golan in 1966
- Born: Kraków, German-occupied Poland
- Other names: Gila Rosenhaus; Miriam Goldenberg
- Occupations: Model and actress
- Spouses: Alex Urban (m. 1964; div. 1968); Matthew Bernard Rosenhaus (m. 1969; died 1980): Third husband?
- Children: 3
- Beauty pageant titleholder
- Years active: 1964–1985
- Major competitions: Miss Israel 1960 (1st Runner-Up); Miss World 1960 (1st Runner-Up)

Gila Golan (Hebrew: גילה גולן) is an Israeli actress and former model.

== Early life ==
Golan does not know when or where she was born. Her parents were murdered in the Holocaust and she was adopted by Zoshia Zawatcki, who saw her wandering the streets of Kraków. She was given the name Zoshia Zavatski by her Polish family and renamed to Mara Goldenberg in Israel. She also used the names Miriam Goldenberg and Gila Goldenberg.

Golan attended a Youth Aliyah boarding school in Aix-les-Bains, France for two years before moving to Israel on January 14, 1948. She worked at a kibbutz for four years. Golan was not conscripted into the Israel Defense Forces due to her not knowing her age.

== Career ==
Golan was spotted by an American photographer and appeared in the Israeli women's magazine LaIsha. In 1960, she was the runner-up for Miss Israel behind Aliza Gur. She placed second in the Miss World 1960 competition and changed her name to Gila Golan to prevent the religiously conservative family she lived with in Tel Aviv from learning about it. She was sent to the United States to raise funds after the competition.

In June 1964, Golan signed a contract with Columbia Pictures. Her first role was as Elsa Lutz in Ship of Fools as a replacement for Sabin Singen, who dropped out due to illness. She was given acting lessons by Herbert Berghof. The Hollywood Foreign Press Association selected her to hand out the awards for the 22nd Golden Globe Awards.

Golan starred in Our Man Flint, which was banned in Lebanon due to her being an Israeli citizen. She also appeared in The Valley of Gwangi and Three on a Couch. Golan ended her career in 1969, citing her poor pay of $150 a week for Our Man Flint while Columbia earned $1,500 as she was on loan, and said that her former agent was sabotaging her career. In the 1980s she aided the fundraising and organization of the 2nd Israel Film Festival.

== Personal life ==
Golan married Alex Urban in 1964, but became separated in 1965, and divorced in Ciudad Juárez, Mexico, in 1967. She married Matthew Bernard Rosenhaus on September 16, 1969, in Montreal, Canada, and had three children with him. Rosenhaus became the largest stockholder in Columbia in 1973.

The city of Seattle ceremonially adopted Golan on April 29, 1966, with Mayor James d'Orma Braman as her godfather. She became a citizen of the United States in 1969. Golan sold her apartment at The Pierre for $10 million in 2014. She now lives in Florida with her third husband.

== Filmography ==
Year	Title	Role	Notes	Reference
1965	Ship of Fools	Elsa		
1965	Kraft Suspense Theatre	Constanze “Tantsy” Lipp	Episode: The Safe House	
1966	Our Man Flint	Gila		
1966	Three on a Couch	Anna Jacque		
1966	I Dream of Jeannie	Princess Tarji	Episode: This is Murder	
1967	Catch as Catch Can	Emma		
1969	The Valley of Gwangi	T.J.		

== Works cited ==
- Who's Who in America. Vol. 2 (37 ed.). Marquis Who's Who. 1972. ISBN 0837901375.
- Ragan, David (1976). Who's Who In Hollywood 1900-1976. Arlington House Publishers. ISBN 0870003496.
