= Josephine, Alabama =

Unincorporated community in Alabama, United States

- Unincorporated community
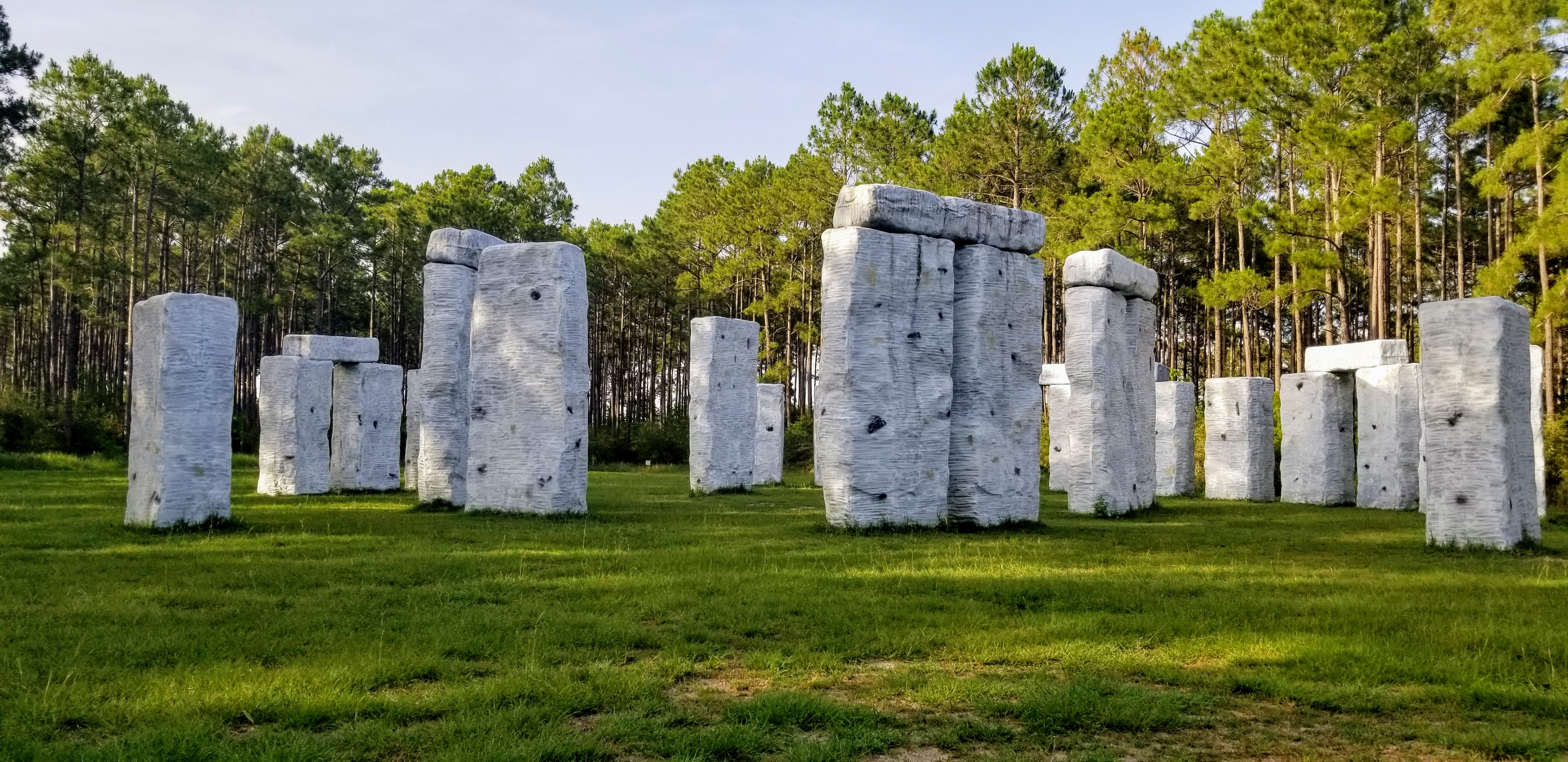
- Bamahenge, a full-scale fiberglass replica of Stonehenge, is located on the grounds of Barber Marina outside of Josephine

- Location within Alabama Location within the United States
- Coordinates: 30°19′36″N 87°31′52″W
- Country: United States
- State: Alabama
- County: Baldwin
- Elevation: 10 ft (3.0 m)
- Time zone: UTC-6 (Central (CST))
  - Summer (DST): UTC-5 (CDT)
- Area code: 251
- GNIS feature ID: 121057

Josephine is an unincorporated community in Baldwin County, Alabama, United States.

== History ==
The community is named for Josephine Ross, who was the daughter of the first postmaster. A post office operated under the name Josephine from 1881 to 1959.

Raphael Semmes, who served as the captain of the commerce raider CSS Alabama during the Civil War, had a summer home in Josephine. In 1898, the McPherson family bought the Semmes property. They operated the Mexiwana Hotel on the site of the Semmes home until 1935. A school, which served grades 1–6, operated in Josephine from 1903 to 1917. The community was also home to a bakery before it moved to Foley.

A small sand mound, built by Native Americans who lived in the area, is located near the site of the former Josephine post office. Bamahenge, a full-scale fiberglass replica of Stonehenge, is located on the grounds of Barber Marina outside of Josephine.
