= Stonehenge Aotearoa =

Stone circle and open-air observatory in New Zealand

Coordinates: 41.0998°S 175.5796°E

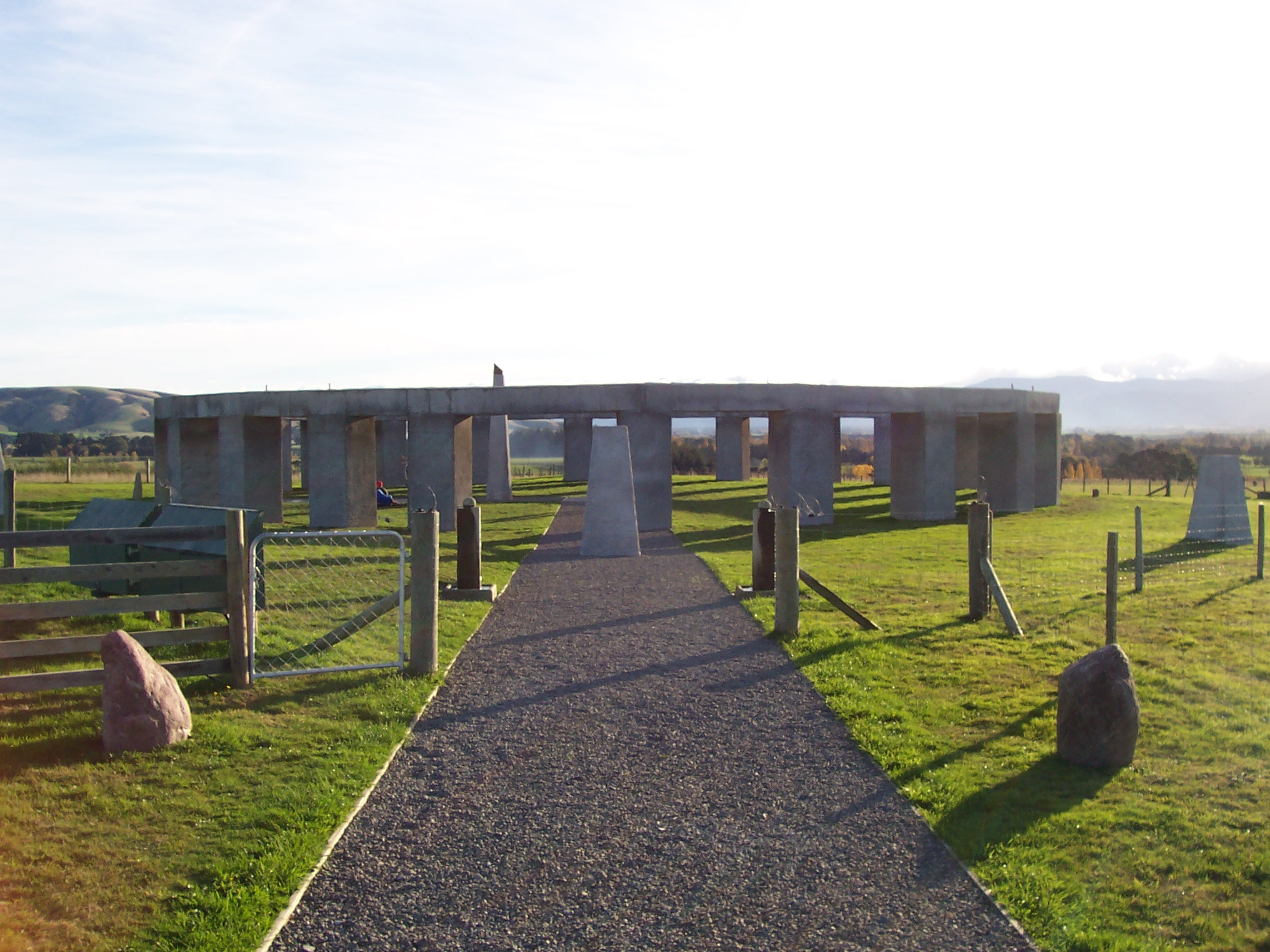
Entrance to Stonehenge Aotearoa

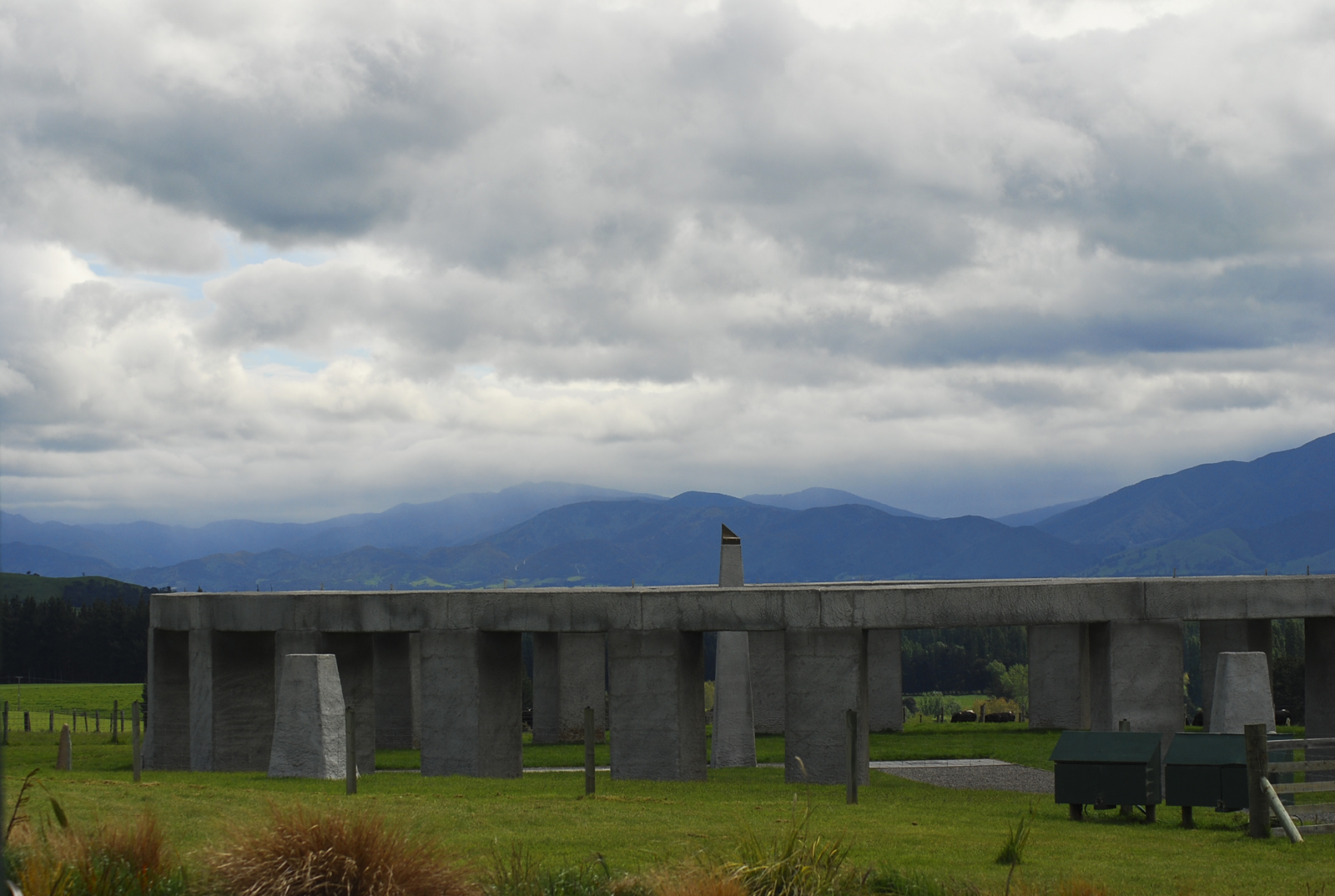
Detail of the Stonehenge Aotearoa exterior

Stonehenge Aotearoa, is one of the largest astronomical installations in New Zealand, an open-sky observatory inspired by and built on a similar scale to the famous Stonehenge in England. The henge is a modern adaptation, inspired by the many stone circles and henges scattered around the world. Stonehenge Aotearoa is designed specifically for its location in Wairarapa region of New Zealand's North Island.

Following the closure of the US Naval Observatory’s Black Birch station in the mid‑1990s, some of the site’s equipment — including the observatory dome — was transferred to New Zealand astronomer Gordon Hudson and the newly formed The Phoenix Astronomical Society (TPAS). These assets, together with government funding and volunteer labour organised by TPAS, supported the construction of Stonehenge Aotearoa, completed in 2005 as a non-profit educational astronomical facility.

A government grant administered by the Royal Society of New Zealand’s Science & Technology Promotion Fund supported the construction of the installation.

The henge, built over 2 years, was opened on 12 February 2005 by Nobel Laureate Professor Alan MacDiarmid.

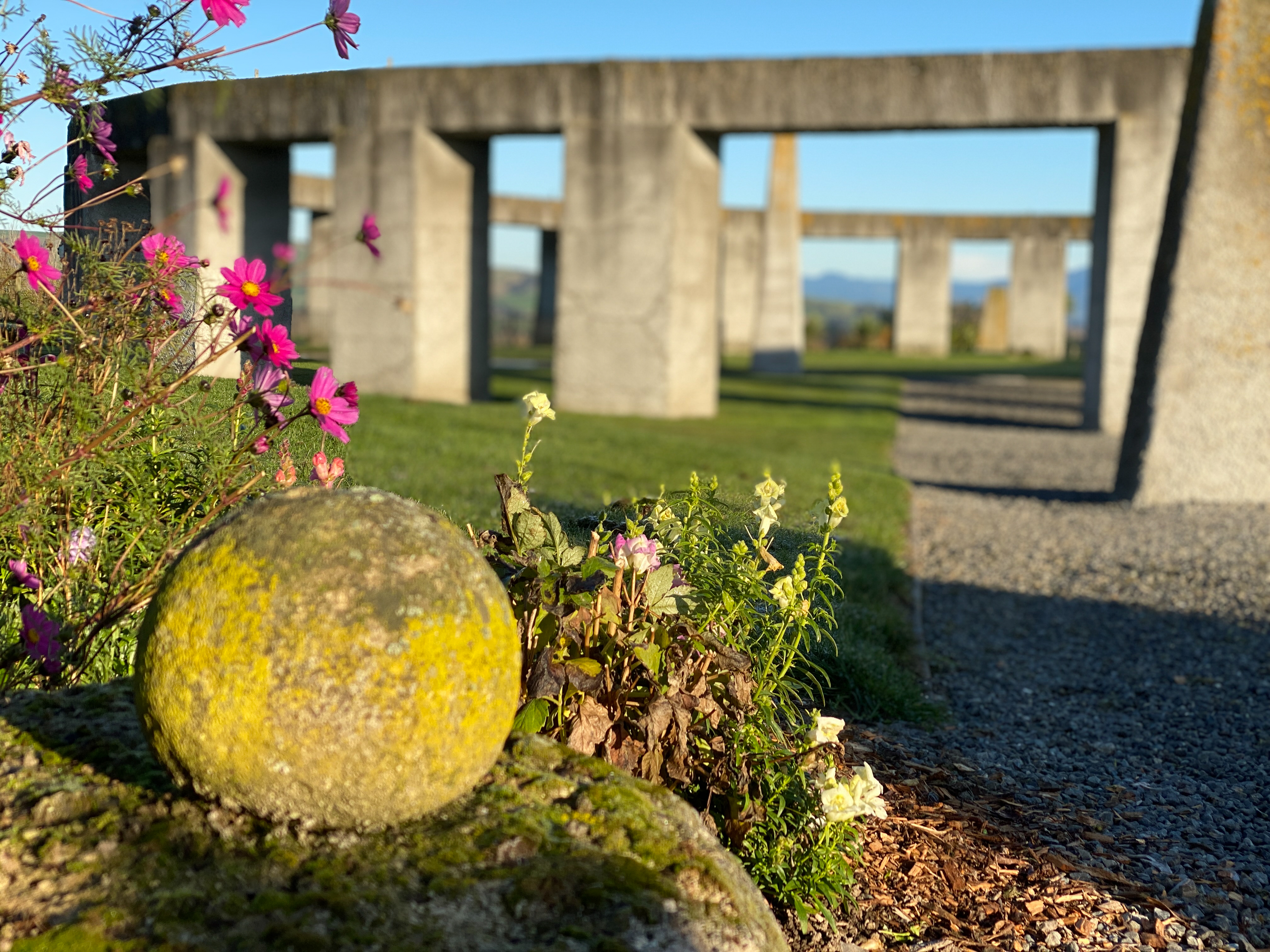
View of the causeway that runs from the East to the centre of the henge.

Stonehenge Aotearoa was built using hollow wooden and cement board structures, which were then coated with cement and sculpted plaster to resemble hewn stone.

It contains 24 pillars and is 30 metres (98 ft) in diameter and about 4 metres (13 ft) high. The pillars are capped with lintels, completing the circle, and a 5 metres (16 ft)-tall obelisk is near the centre of the henge. From the obelisk, along the meridian line is a 10-metres area called the analemma. The henge is similar to the sarsen cycle of the original Stonehenge and has the same diameter. Entry is via a causeway, which runs due west to the centre. Ten metres outside the circle of the henge stand six heel stones of varying heights.

The modern henge was designed to demonstrate how ancient peoples used such constructions to understand astronomy and also to explain basic astronomical ideas.

According to promotional materials, Stonehenge Aotearoa was also intended to illustrate the concept of the star compass, a navigational technique attributed to Polynesian voyaging traditions. The pillars are not equidistant and their placement reveals important navigational and seasonal stars.

The structure frames the rising points of the Sun, the Moon, and bright stars that are either important seasonal markers or navigational beacons.

== Astronomical Alignments and Matariki ==
The design incorporates various astronomical alignments, including those marking solstices, equinoxes, and the Māori New Year. As the Earth orbits around the Sun, the north and south poles are alternately tilted towards the Sun. The Sun's altitude therefore increases and decreases during the year, producing seasons. Stonehenge Aotearoa's six heel stones mark the place where the Sun is rising and setting at solstices and equinoxes.

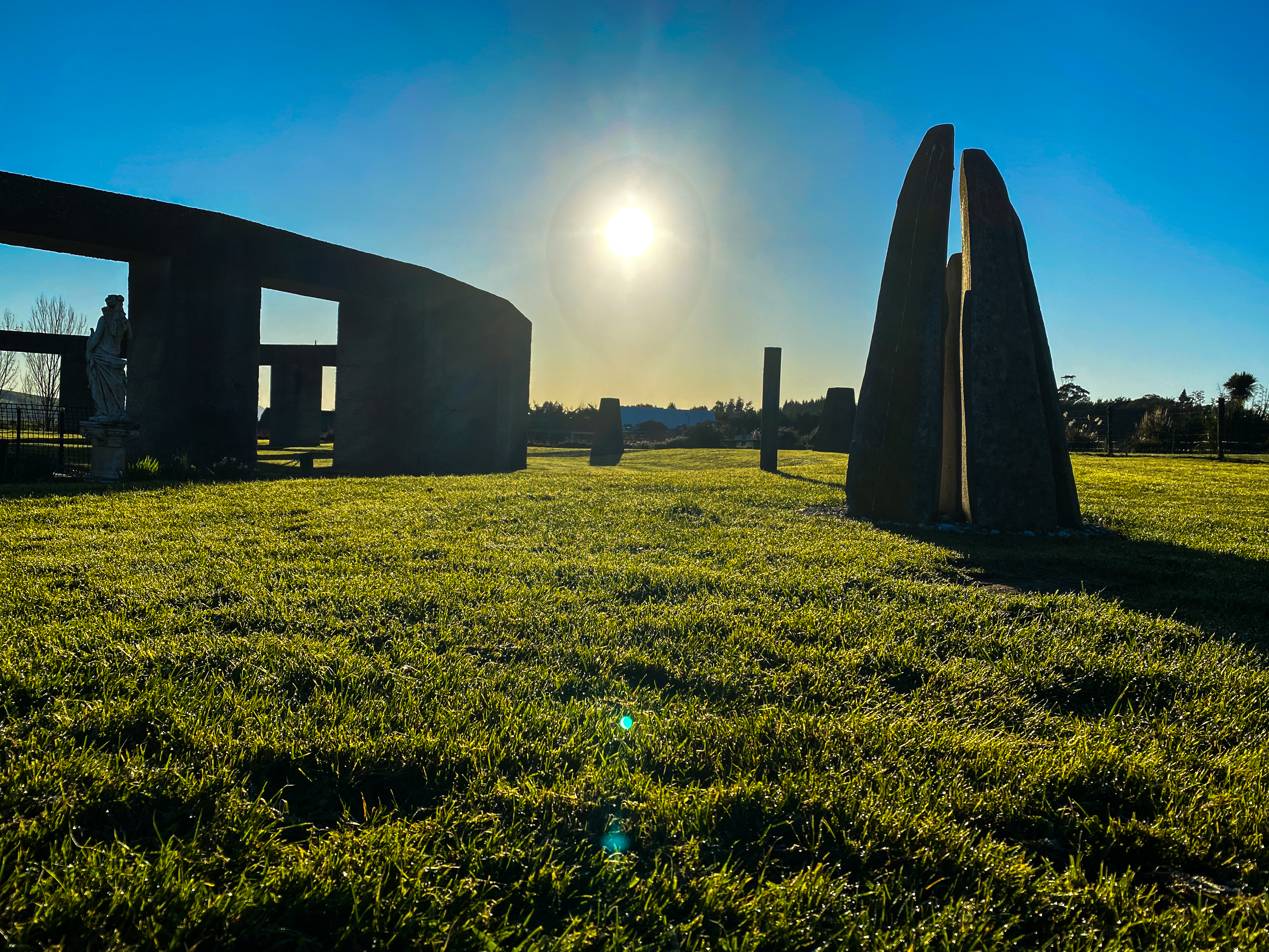
This sculpture marks the place of the heliacal rising of Matariki around winter solstice at Stonehenge Aotearoa.

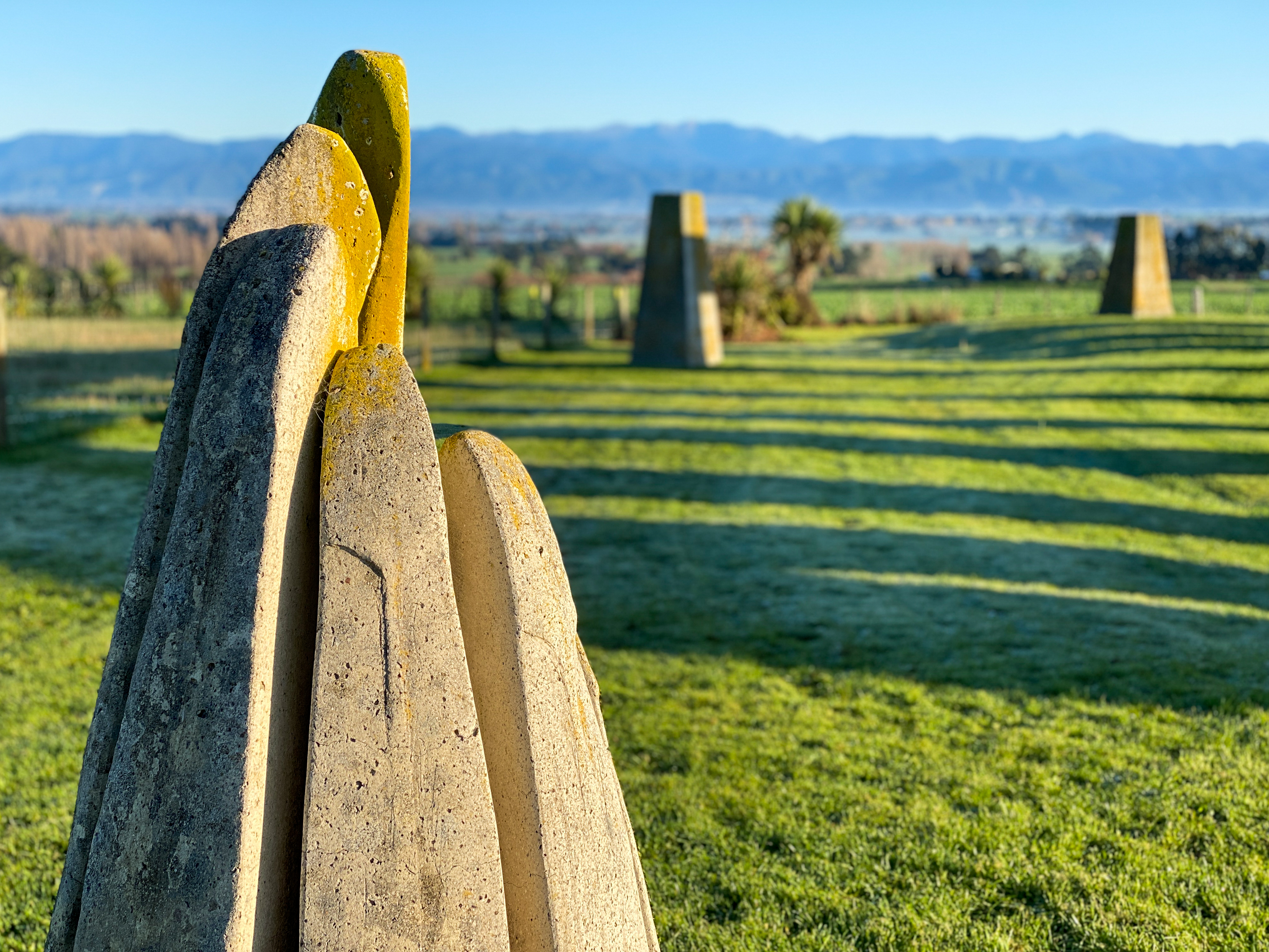
Stonehenge Aotearoa has various sculptures placed around the structure.

The stone sculpture "the Fingers of Mother Earth" marks the place where the heliacal rising of Matariki can be observed around the winter solstice in June.

== See also ==
- Stonehenge replicas and derivatives
