= Bamahenge =

Stonehenge replica in Alabama, United States

Coordinates: 30.331442°N 87.567297°W

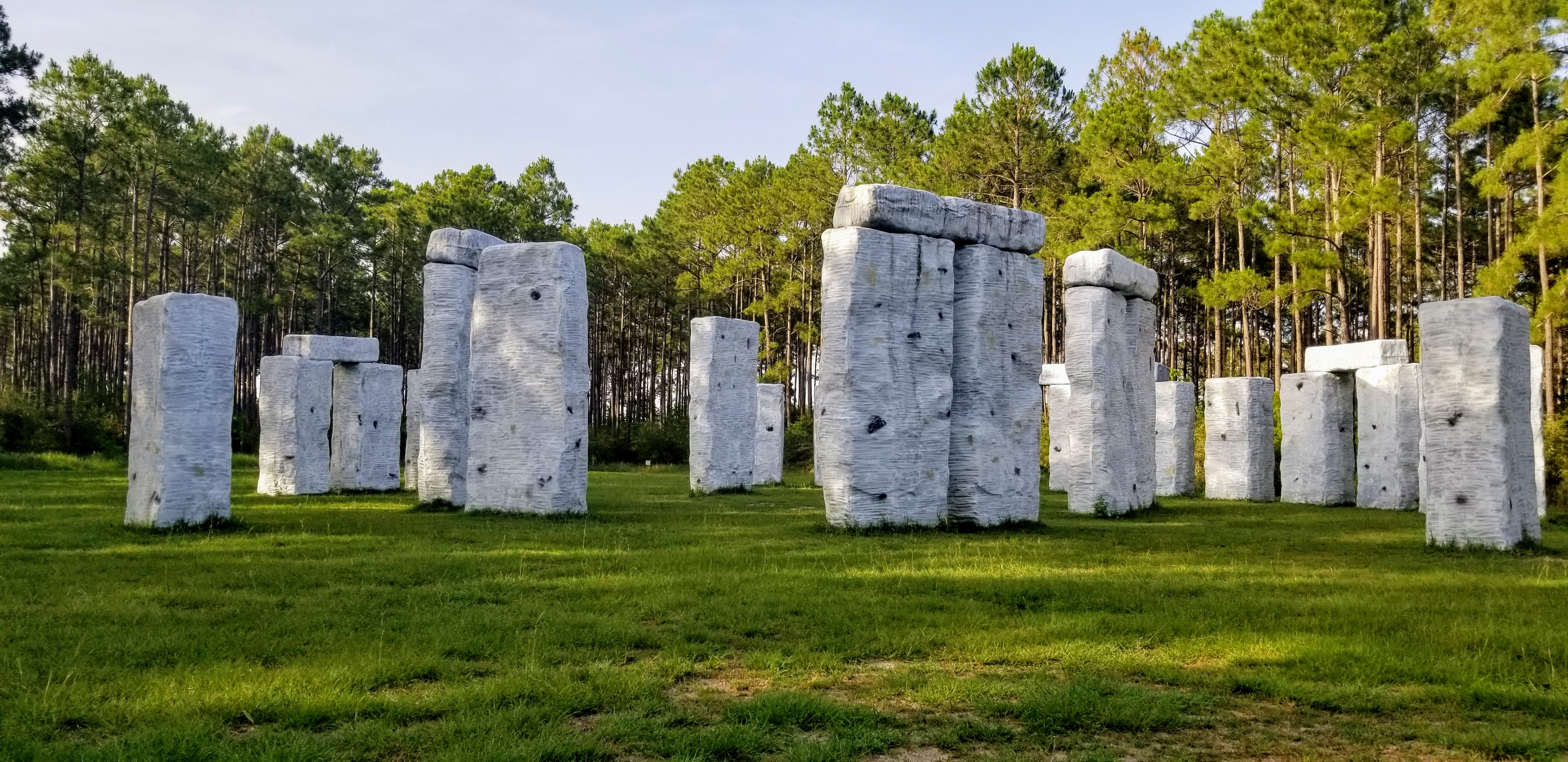
Bamahenge in Alabama

Bamahenge is a full-scale fiberglass replica of England's prehistoric Stonehenge monument, located on the grounds of Barber Marina near Josephine, Alabama. It was designed and built by artist Mark Cline, at the request of marina owner George W. Barber.

== History ==
The idea for a Stonehenge replica in Alabama originated with billionaire dairy magnate George W. Barber. In 1991, Barber had commissioned Virginia artist Mark Cline of Enchanted Castle Studios to design and install seven life-size dinosaurs as "lawn ornaments" on one of his properties. While Cline was onsite repairing hurricane damage to the sculptures in 2006, Barber, perhaps aware of the recent installation of Cline's Foamhenge replica in Virginia, asked him to build a life-size Stonehenge replica at his Vintage Motorsports Museum outside of Birmingham, Alabama. By the time Cline was able to begin work on the project in 2012, Barber had relocated four of the dinosaurs to the grounds of Barber Marina and decided to instead install the Stonehenge replica on the marina grounds, in the woods to the north of the dinosaurs.

The name Fiberhenge was briefly considered for the work, but Cline decided that it "didn't have the ring" he wanted and instead named the installation Bamahenge.

== Structure ==
Bamahenge is a full-scale replica of Stonehenge, measuring 21 feet (6.4 m) tall and 104 feet (32 m) across. Like Stonehenge, the installation is oriented so that the sun rises over the center of three lintels on the outer markers on the summer solstice. Bamahenge is not an exact replica, however: the monument is constructed from only four different shapes of fiberglass "stones", oriented in different ways. The pieces were designed so that the smaller ones could nest inside the larger ones for transportation from Cline's Virginia studio to the Alabama coast, which required four flatbed tractor-trailer loads.

Located only four miles (6.4 km) from the Gulf of Mexico, Bamahenge is located in an active tropical storm and hurricane zone. To protect the work from high winds, each "stone" is anchored by a wooden pole extending 8 feet (2.4 m) up into the "stone" and a similar distance underground. The lower portion of the "stone" and a pit beneath, surrounding the pole, are filled with concrete.

== Access ==
Bamahenge is located 200 yards (180 m) west of the access road to Barber Marina. A small parking area sits at the head of the path to the monument.

While most closely located to the unincorporated community of Josephine in Baldwin County, Alabama, Bamahenge is more often associated with the larger nearby town of Elberta, Alabama.
