= Ponyhenge =

Roadside art installation in Lincoln, Massachusetts

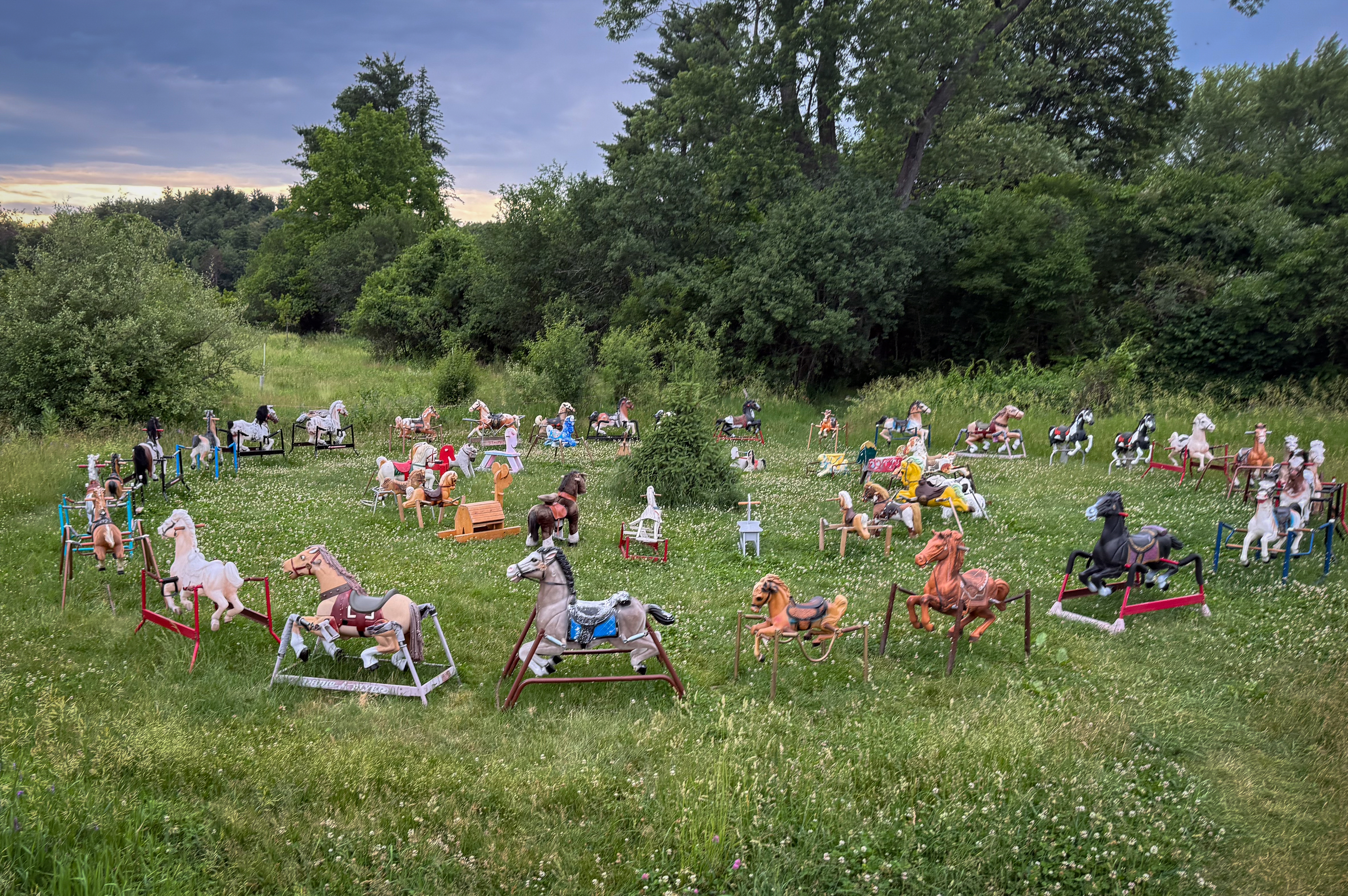
- Ponyhenge in June 2026
- Year: 2010
- Medium: Toy rocking horses, spring-mounted toy horses, hobby horses, and other horse figures
- Location: Lincoln, Massachusetts, United States; 42°24′05″N 71°19′45″W

Ponyhenge is a roadside art installation and local landmark in Lincoln, Massachusetts, United States. It consists of roughly fifty toy rocking horses, hobby horses, and other horse figures arranged in a pasture. The installation began in 2010 and has grown through anonymous additions by local residents and visitors. Its name refers to the way the horses are arranged in a circle, evoking Stonehenge.

== Description ==
Ponyhenge is located on privately owned land in rural Lincoln. The installation consists of a field of children's horse toys, including wooden rocking horses, plastic horse figures, and horses mounted on metal springs. The arrangement of the horses changes periodically, being placed in circles, rows, racing formations, scattered groupings, and other patterns, sometimes connected to current events or holidays. Many of the horses have been left by unknown people, and visitors have also rearranged or decorated the figures. During the COVID-19 pandemic, some of the horses wore surgical masks, and during the 2020 United States election season the field included political signs with horse-related puns.

== History ==
The first horse at Ponyhenge was placed in the field around 2010. It had belonged to the children of the field's owners, James Pingeon and Elizabeth Graver. Originally used in a headless horseman Halloween display, the horse was then left in the field.

After the first horse was left in the field, a neighbor added an additional horse toy. Soon, other horse toys began appearing anonymously. By 2015, the horse population had doubled, causing Ponyhenge to become a recognizable local landmark. The horse population expanded from about 30 to roughly 42 horses in a few weeks after this regional attention, with residents and visitors continuing to add to the collection. Pingeon occasionally culls broken horses from the herd.

== Reception ==
Ponyhenge has been covered by regional and national outlets as a roadside attraction and unusual local landmark. The Boston Globe, Atlas Obscura, Roadtrippers, Mental Floss, CBS Boston, and Discover Concord have profiled the installation. A couple married at Ponyhenge in March 2020.

== See also ==
- Roadside attraction
- Stonehenge replicas and derivatives
