= Phonehenge West =

Former folk art structure in Acton, California, USA

Coordinates: 34.524528°N 118.236563°W

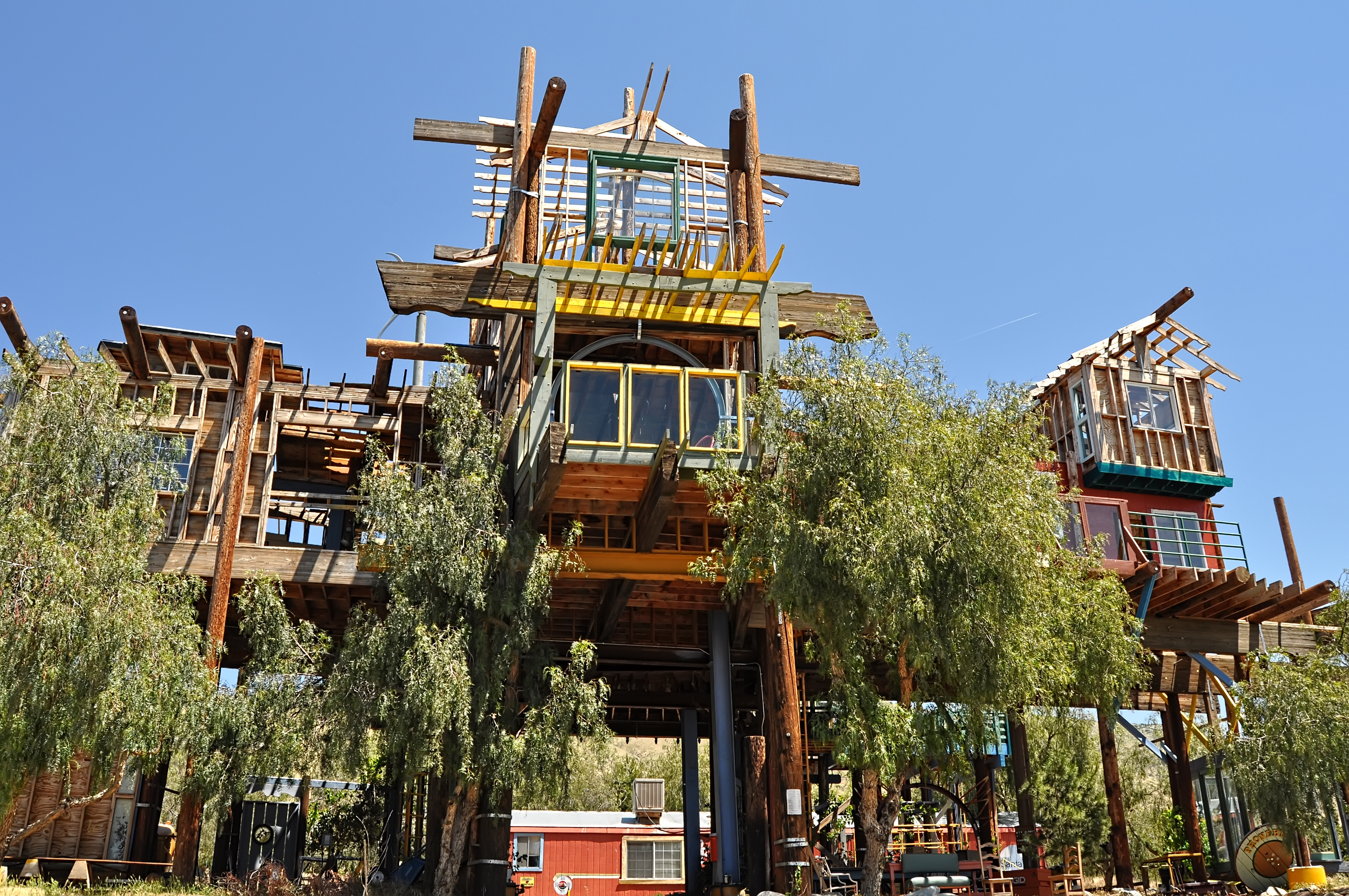
Unfinished tower 5 in May 2011, prior to its demolition

Phonehenge West was a large folk art structure envisioned and constructed by Alan Kimble "Kim" Fahey, which included a 70-foot tower made from reclaimed material such as telephone poles, and props from old movie sets. The structure rested on his 1.7 acre property in Acton, California. The compound included 13 structures and was a representation of folk art.

== Construction ==
The majority of the construction was done by Fahey himself over the course of 30 years. Fahey is a retired phone company technician; much of the building material consisted of discarded telephone poles.

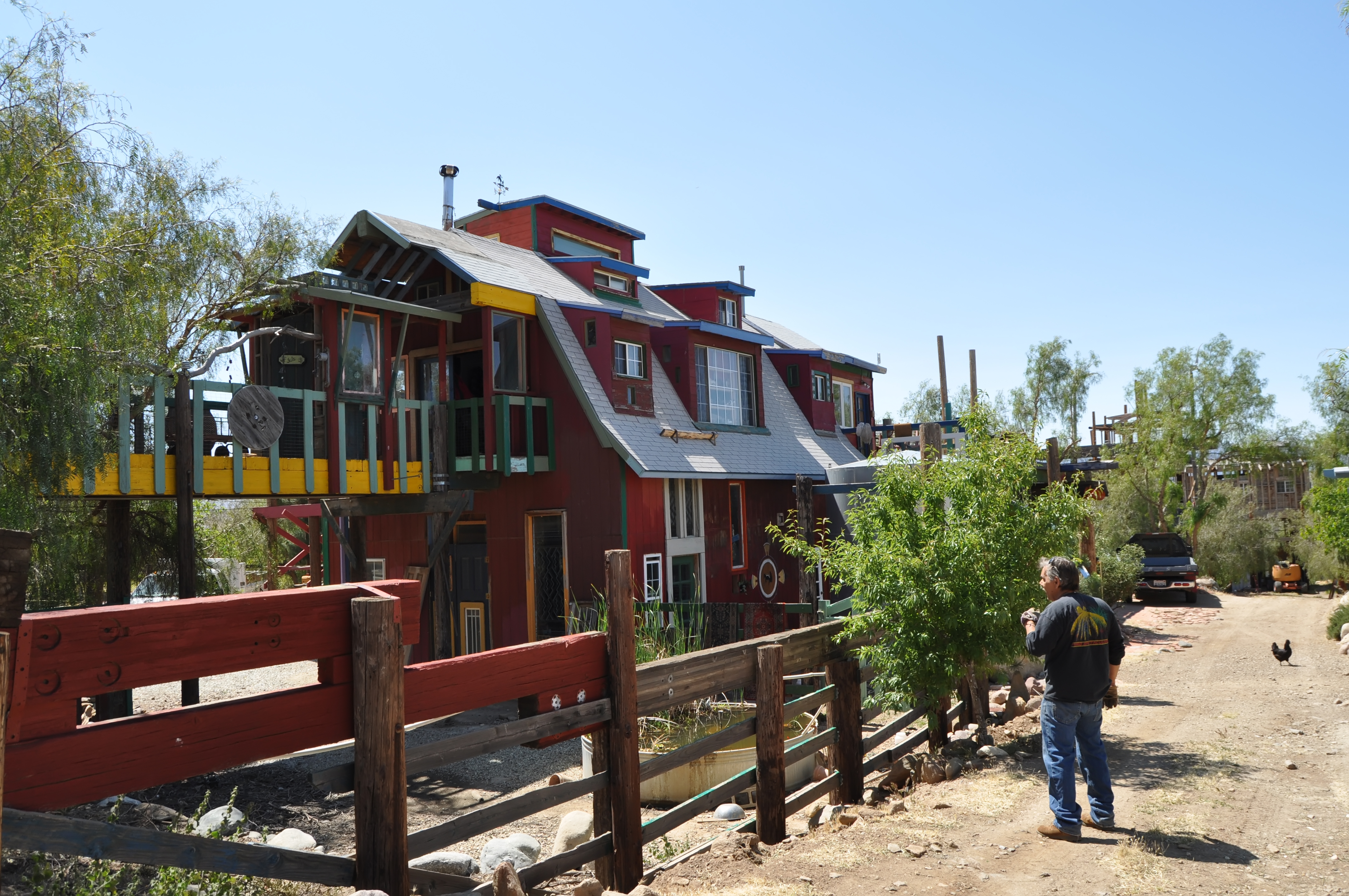
Phonehenge building in May 2011

== Destruction ==
The structure was destroyed by the county of Los Angeles in August 2011 for building code violations.

Los Angeles County Superior Court judge Daviann L. Mitchell ordered Fahey to pay the $83,488 in demolition costs, in addition to performing 63 days of community service, of which a minimum of 5 days had to be served at the L.A. County or Kern County morgue.

During the demolition, which took three weeks, four truckloads of material were removed from the property. Fahey requested that the material be saved for reuse but all 53 tons of telephone poles and 280 tons of steel were too badly damaged by the end of the demolition operation. In December 2012, Fahey was sentenced to 539 days in jail for failure to pay.

The name Phonehenge West is a parody of Stonehenge, a prehistoric monument located in the English county of Wiltshire.

== See also ==
- Vernacular architecture
