= Mystical Horizons =

Coordinates: 48°56′55″N 100°31′24″W

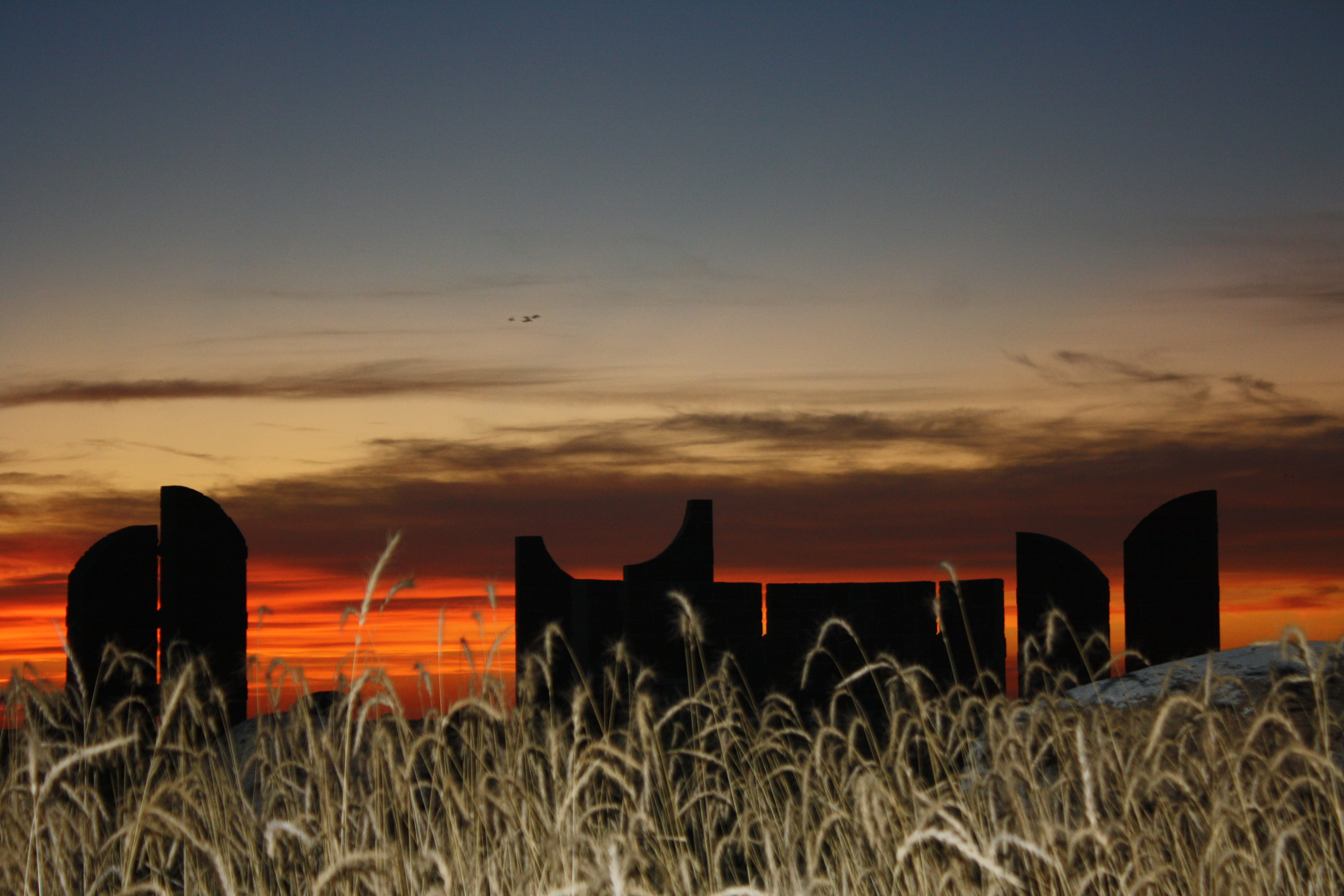
September sunset at Mystic Horizons

Mystical Horizons is an astronomical-themed site located near Carbury, North Dakota on North Dakota Highway 43 near the North Dakota and Manitoba border. The attraction contains a working solar calendar built from granite pillars, intended to represent a 21st-century Stonehenge, and other instruments intended to explain astronomical phenomena and principles.

== History and description ==
A plaque at the site reads "dedicated to Jack Olson's vision of a Century 21 Stonehenge". The concept was the vision of Jack Olson, an aerospace engineer and designer. Though Olson died of cancer in 2001 before construction began, the community raised funds to make his dream a reality, along with partnerships including the North Dakota Forest Service, North Dakota Department of Transportation, and the city of Bottineau. Mystical Horizons opened on October 21, 2005.

Mystical Horizons includes multiple components designed to connect visitors with the cosmos:

- six walls with slots that act as a solar calendar, with direct sunlight passing through the slots only on the winter and summer solstices and the vernal and autumnal equinoxes,
- a sighting tube in fixed position demonstrating the location of Polaris, and
- a human-sized sundial.

Each instrument is accompanied by information about how to use the devices and explanations of the scientific principles demonstrated.

A panoramic view of the Turtle Mountains, as well as the surrounding valley, is available from the site.

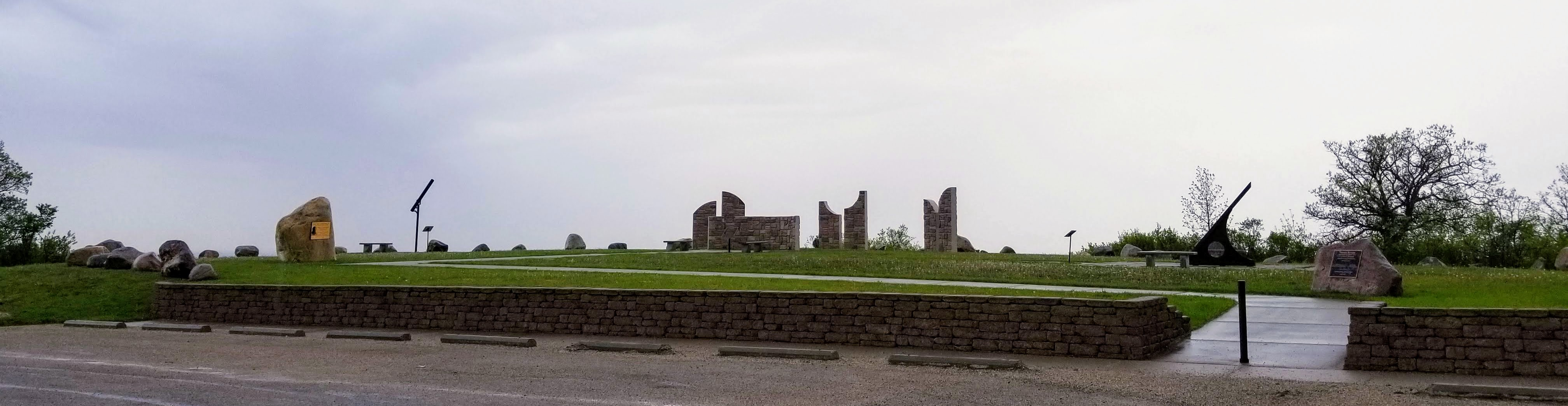
Mystical Horizons site (2020)

== Conceptual Designer ==
John (Jack) Olson was an aerospace engineer and inventor. He was born on a farm near Bottineau on October 24, 1922. Olson served in the Army Air Forces during World War II as a B-24 instructor pilot. In 1950 he joined Brown & Bigelow as the chief designer in metal and plastic products, receiving 120 mechanical and design patents and designing the Tupperware party favor "the pickle plucker".

Olson worked for Boeing from 1958 to 1984, working on projects such as the Boeing Jetfoil and the Morgantown Personal Rapid Transit system. He was also part of the engineering and design team for the landing pads for the Apollo Lunar Module and the Lunar Landing Vehicle. He held a seat on the National Space Society Board of Governors. Olson was also an artist of illustrations of space exploration, and 21 of his space paintings were displayed at the Smithsonian National Air and Space Museum. He earned a diamond badge from the Soaring Society of America, demonstrating advanced gliding skills, and held a master-photographer certification from the Photographic Society of America. Olson was the author of a book about his life growing up in the Turtle Mountains published posthumously in 2009: Once In The Middle Of Nowhere: The Center of the Universe: A Collection of Turtle Mountain Tales.

In his retirement, Olson spent time in Bottineau, creating a series of community projects, including making plans for Mystical Horizons. He died in Normandy Park, Washington, on August 28, 2001.
