= Esperance Stonehenge =

Stonehenge replica in Western Australia

Coordinates: 33.7879°S 122.0296°E

Esperance Stonehenge is a full-sized replica of Stonehenge, in Esperance, Western Australia. It was built from 137 locally quarried stones of up to 50 tonnes (110,000 lb), and is aligned to the summer and winter solstices. In total, it weighs 2,500 tonnes (5.5 million pounds). It is designed to be a copy of the original, intact Stonehenge from about 2000 BCE, rather than the currently extant ruins.

The stone was originally quarried and shaped for a similar project in Margaret River in 2008, funded by a millionaire. That project fell through after 12 months, after the stone had already been cut. The Rotary Club of Esperance promoted the idea of building a Stonehenge replica locally, but the plan was controversial, received mixed reactions from the community, and there was no agreed-upon site.

Kim and Jillian Beale, who owned a hobby farm across from the quarry, decided to build the replica on their property with their own money, after receiving approval from the Shire of Esperance in 2010, in January 2011. This construction was completed on 26 October, 2011. It was designed by architect Michael Sorensen of Sorensen Architects, and used 1,200 cubic metres (42,000 cu ft) of Desert Brown granite supplied and installed by AustralAsian Granite. It is operated as a tourist attraction, charging A$15 per adult and A$6 per child as of 2026.

== General references ==
- Duke, Jennifer (21 February 2015). "Stonehenge replica in Western Australia yours for $5 million". Domain.
- Burton, Jesinta (8 February 2019). "Steep uphill battle". The Esperance Express.
- Wynne, Emma (4 October 2011). "Full size Stonehenge replica in Esperance attracting international attention". ABC Esperance. Australian Broadcasting Corporation.
