= Mark Cline =

American artist and entertainer

- Born: 1961 (age 64–65); Waynesboro, Virginia

Mark Cline is an American artist and entertainer. Inspired by monster and science fiction films. He produces foam and fiberglass figures and fantasy characters for attractions and cities.

Cline has described Foamhenge as his greatest achievement. He later designed and built Bamahenge, a full-size fiberglass replica of Stonehenge, in Baldwin County, Alabama. Cline has also built hundreds of dinosaur statues, including thirty for his own Dinosaur Kingdom and nineteen for Dinosaur Land in White Post, Virginia, the park that inspired him to sculpt. Cline's work appears in attractions across Virginia, including a concentration of works in and around Natural Bridge, where he works out of Enchanted Castle Studios. His studio appears in the book Weird Virginia and the Roadside America books and website.

He often displays creations on April Fools' Day. For example, Foamhenge was unveiled on April Fools' Day 2004.

Cline was born in 1961 in Waynesboro, Virginia, where in 1987 he unsuccessfully lobbied city council to erect a 60-foot (18 m) bust of "Mad" Anthony Wayne atop the city's capped landfill. Cline was often featured in Waynesboro's newspaper, The News Virginian. He completed a mural on both abutments of a railroad bridge over U.S. Route 250 just outside city limits.

Fire destroyed much of Cline's studio in 2001 and in 2012. Foamhenge was moved to the Cox Farm and Dinosaur Kingdom II across from the Natural Bridge Zoo.
