= Foamhenge =

Styrofoam replica of Stonehenge

Coordinates: 37.640723°N 79.541333°W

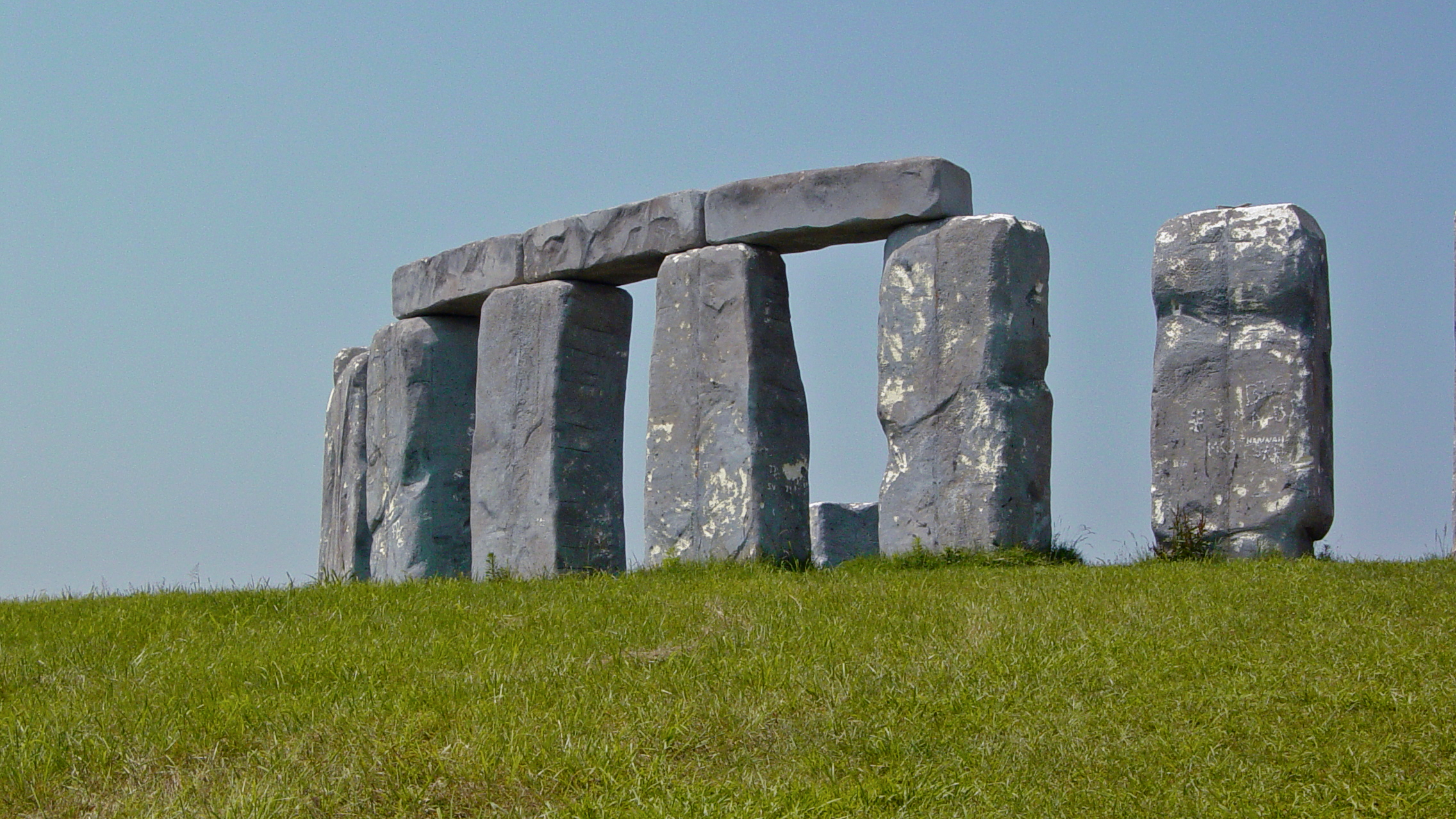
Foamhenge in 2006

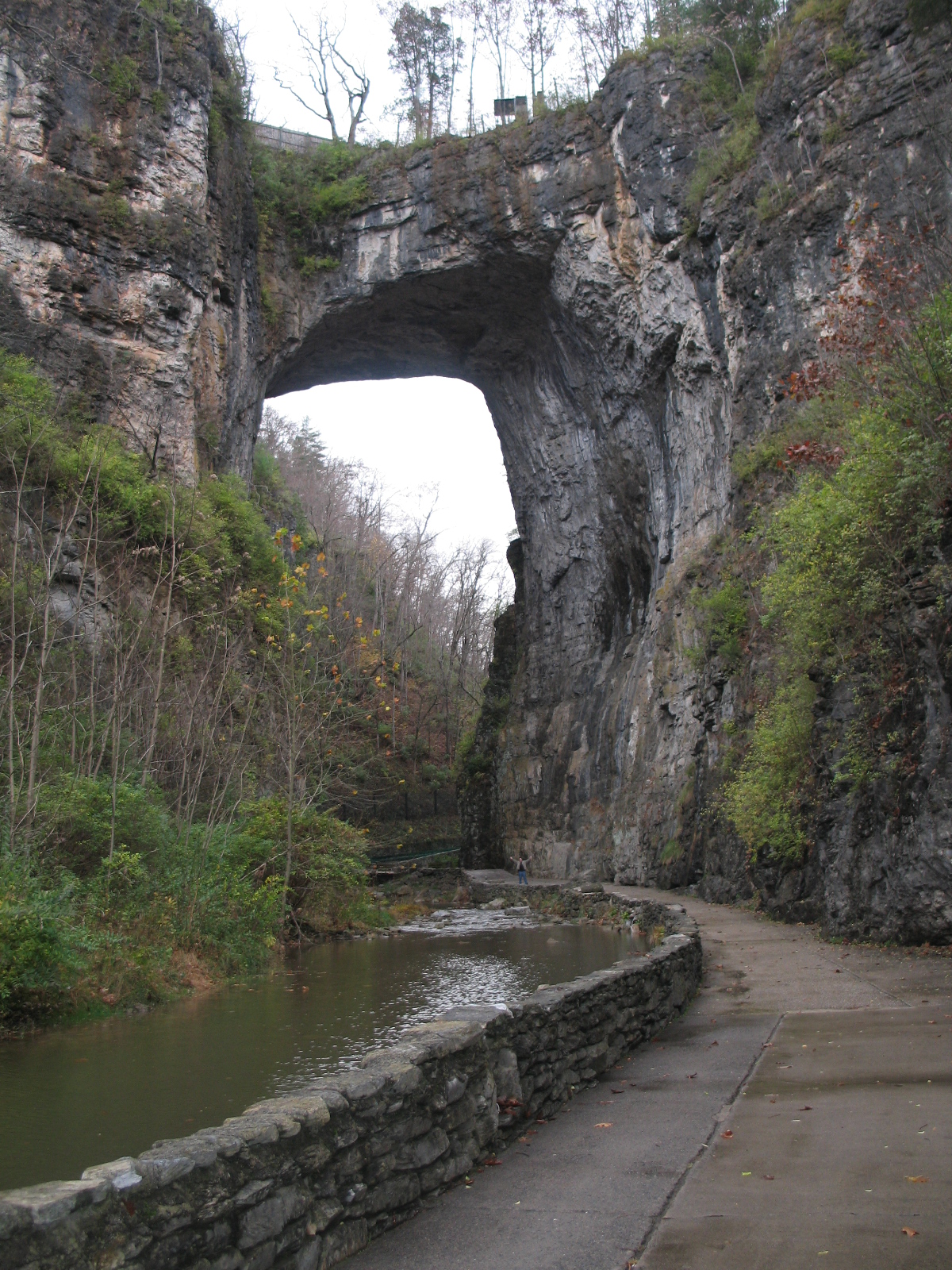
Natural Bridge in VA was home to Foamhenge from 2004 to 2016.

Foamhenge is a full-scale styrofoam replica of Stonehenge, which was originally located in Natural Bridge, Virginia. It was conceived and built by artist Mark Cline as a roadside attraction, and opened on April 1, 2004. In 2017, Foamhenge was relocated to Centreville, Virginia.

== Design and construction ==
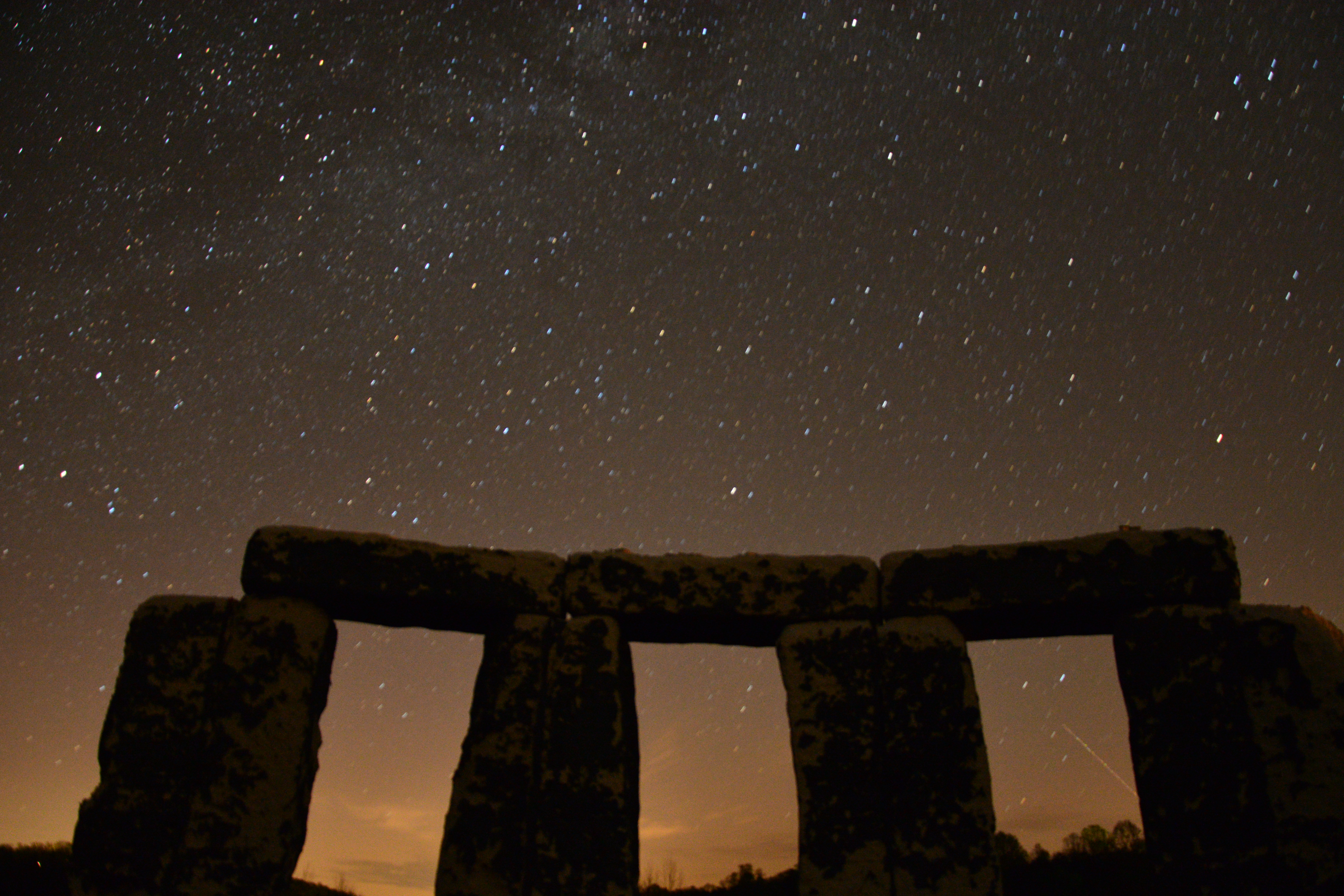
Foamhenge at night

Foamhenge was created in 2004 by Mark Cline of Enchanted Castle Studios as an April Fool's Day stunt to generate tourism. The idea for Foamhenge came to Mark in 1998, when he was inspired by 16-foot-tall (4.9 m) foam blocks that he saw at a local insulation manufacturer. Mark had the concept and materials, but needed a location for his creation. Later the same year, Cline made an agreement with The Natural Bridge for rent-free land with the intention of attracting tourists to both sites.

Foamhenge was designed to match Stonehenge, with similarly sized pieces oriented in astronomically equivalent coordinates. The faux stones are composed completely of styrofoam and painted gray, weighing approximately 420 lbs. apiece. They are stabilized with embedded 2.5-inch-diameter (6.4 cm) piping, extending from a concrete footing to the top of each stone. The entire structure was assembled in about six weeks, as opposed to Stonehenge's construction period of about 1500 years.

== Relocation ==
Foamhenge stayed at the Natural Bridge site for over 12 years. By 2015, the foam pieces had deteriorated markedly due to the temporary nature of their construction and overexposure to the elements in a moderate climate. Many of the pieces had fallen into disrepair to the point that they had split apart and held together with temporary supports.

The Natural Bridge became a state park in 2016, subsequently causing Foamhenge to close. The structure was dismantled on August 30, 2016, and placed in storage. After receiving over fifty inquiries from across the United States, Cline agreed to relocate Foamhenge to Cox Farms, a popular 116-acre (47 ha) family farm, near Centreville, VA, a suburb of Washington, D.C. After the pieces were repaired and repainted, they were moved and re-constructed, with help from an astronomer, for permanent display at Cox Farms. With guidance from Harold Geller, the Observatory Director at nearby George Mason University, the pieces were accurately placed to align with the Summer solstice just like Stonehenge. Foamhenge officially re-opened at its new location just in time for the start of the farm's Fall Festival on September 16, 2017.

== Pop culture ==
Foamhenge was created as a whimsical, temporary, roadside attraction and architectural folly, but its popularity sustained its legitimacy and permanence. Foamhenge's quirkiness holds a certain appeal to a unique national subculture and it has become a must-see for many. Over time the attraction garnered the attention of many articles and television programs pertaining to American roadside attractions. In July 2022, 'Big Potato Games' announced that Foamhenge would be one of 49 popular national roadside attractions featured in "Zillionaires: Road Trip USA", its new Monopoly-style family board game. A photo of Foamhenge appears on the game's box.

== See also ==
- Stonehenge replicas and derivatives
- Stonehenge
- Roadside attraction
- Natural Bridge
