= Dinosaur World =

Dinosaur World may refer to:

- Dinosaur World (Arkansas), a defunct theme park in Arkansas, USA
- Dinosaur World (Creswick), a defunct theme park in Creswick, Victoria, Australia
- Dinosaur World (theme parks), a family of theme parks in Florida, Kentucky and Texas in the US, each with over 150 life size dinosaur sculptures
- Dinosaur World (video game), a free downloadable video game published by the BBC
- Dinosaur World, a 2020 film directed by Ryan Bellgardt

== See also ==
- Dinosaur Planet (disambiguation)
- List of dinosaur parks
