= Hudson County Burial Grounds =

Cemetery in New Jersey

Coordinates: 40.76161°N 74.074985°W

Memorial

The Hudson County Burial Grounds, also known as the Secaucus Potter's Field and Snake Hill Cemetery, is located in Secaucus, New Jersey.

The cemetery was cleared of bodies to make room for the Secaucus Transfer Station and Exit 15X of the New Jersey Turnpike between 1992-2003. More than 4,000 bodies were disinterred. Two bodies were identified and reburied by their families, but the rest were reinterred in Maple Grove Park Cemetery. (The bodies were to be interred at Hoboken Cemetery, North Bergen, but when pits were dug for the bodies, human remains were found, in what was sold as virgin cemetery space.)

Patrick Andriani, a Hudson County native, had been searching for his grandfathers remains for years prior to Exit 15X being proposed by the New Jersey Transit Authority. Once human remains had been found during excavation for the exit ramp, he was the first to be contacted as a potential living descendant. Eventually, they were able to identify his grandfather, Leonardo Andriani, by his skeletal remains and could inter him in a grave of his own at Maple Grove Park. This inspired the award-winning documentary titled "Snake Hill" released in 2007.

It is estimated that there are another 5,000 or so graves that have not been found, probably lying outside the Secaucus Junction projects construction areas. Some may lie underneath footings and embankments of the New Jersey Turnpike.

The bodies were reburied at the Maple Grove Park Cemetery in Hackensack, New Jersey. The last body was removed from the cemetery on October 31, 2003. The remains of 4,572 were transferred. The Register of Burials listed interments between December 31, 1880, and April 12, 1962, but those within the removal area were from between 1920 and 1962. The cemetery served the insane asylum and the poor house that later became the Meadowview Psychiatric Hospital.

== Snake Hill ==
The Snake Hill region of Secaucus, New Jersey, was the location of the Old Bergen Poor Farm in the late 18th century. In 1840 the southern part of Bergen became Hudson County, which later purchased the land and placed their Insane Asylum and Alms House there.

== Archaeology ==
The Berger Group which performed the removals wrote:

A total of 113,532 artifacts or non-skeletal objects were recovered of which over 50 percent were coffin nails. Other personal effects or "grave goods" included dentures, glass eyes, coins, clay smoking pipes, embalming bottles, whiskey/wine bottles, combs, over 4,500 buttons, over 500 ceramic fragments, clothing remnants, shoes, hats, jewelry, military medals, religious items, and medical devices or prosthetics. ... Using historic maps, original hand-written burial ledgers, osteological examination, background research, and artifact analysis, Berger's team was able to determine possible identities for approximately 900 of the disinterred remains. Of particular note, positive identifications were established for two interments who have living linear descendants. The remains of a woman who died in 1928 and a man who was buried in 1949 were returned to their respective families for private ceremonies and reburial - ending the search for their long-lost grandparents.

== See also ==
- List of cemeteries in Hudson County, New Jersey
