= List of dinosaur parks =

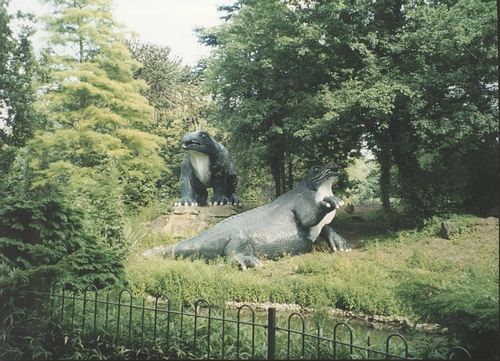
Dinosaurs at Crystal Palace Dinosaurs, the oldest dinosaur park

A dinosaur park usually refers to a theme park in which several life-size sculptures or models of prehistoric animals, especially dinosaurs are displayed. The first dinosaur park worldwide was Crystal Palace Dinosaurs, which opened in London in 1854. Other dinosaur parks are listed below.

== Europe ==
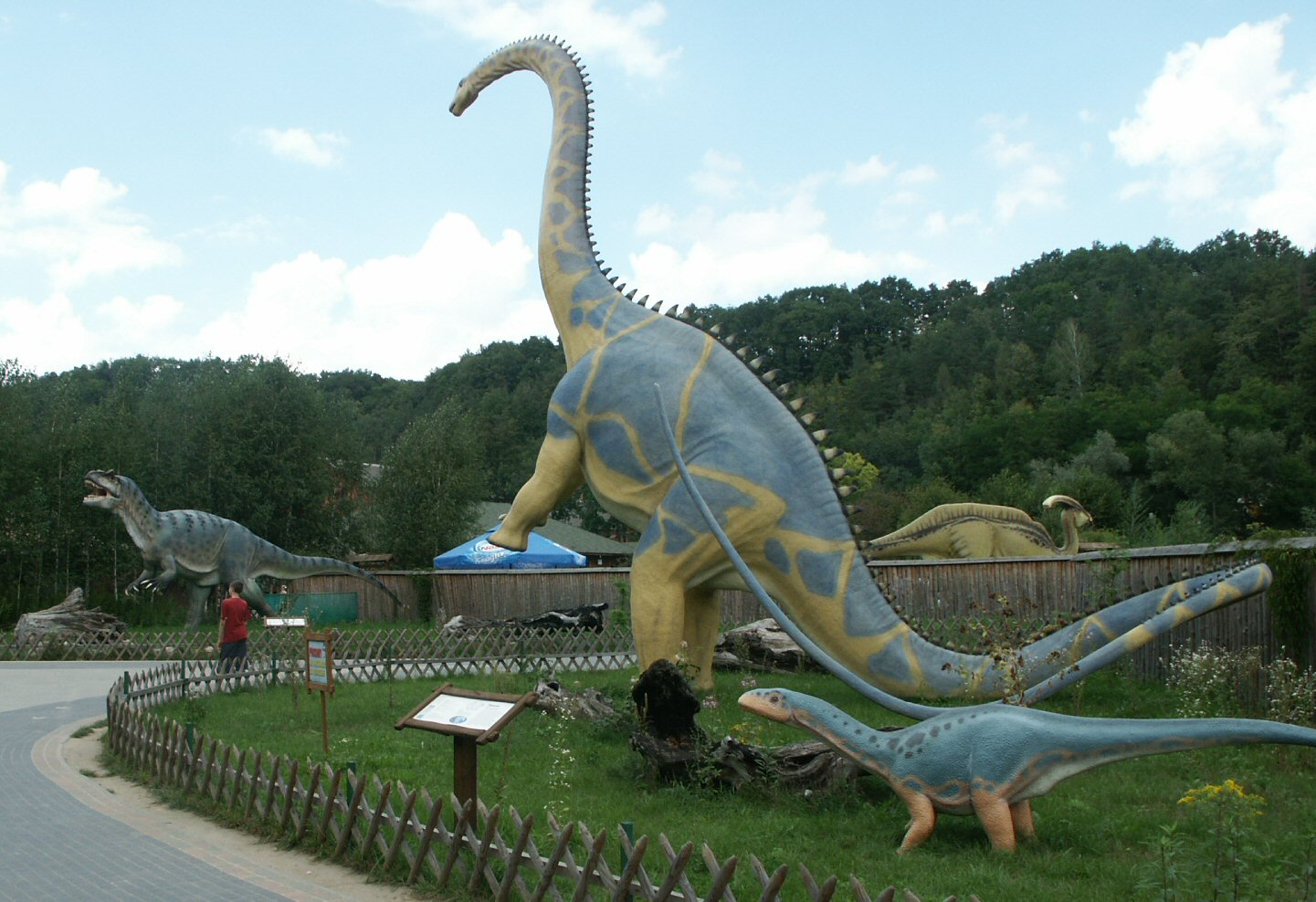
Diplodocus and Allosaurus at Bałtów Jurassic Park

=== Austria ===
- Styrassic Park in Bad Gleichenberg
- Triassic Park in Waidring Tirol.
- World of Dinosaurs: mobile exhibition with numerous stations in Europe. Currently in Perchtoldsdorf

=== Croatia ===
- Dinopark Funtana in Funtana, Istria

=== Czech Republic ===
- DinoPark Praha in Prague
- DinoPark Ostrava in Ostrava
- DinoPark Plzeň in Plzeň
- DinoPark Liberec in Liberec
- DinoPark Vyškov in Vyškov
- Prehistoric Park in Chvalovice

=== France ===
- Dino-Zoo du Doubs in Charbonnières-les-Sapins
- Parc Préhistorique de Bretagne in Malansac
- Musée parc des dinosaures in Mèze
- PréhistoDino Parc in Lacave en Quercy
- Dinosaur'Istres in Istres

=== Germany ===
- Tierpark Hagenbeck
- de:Dinosaur Park (Münchehagen) (Dinopark) in Rehburg-Loccum
- Dinosaur Park (Kleinwelka), Bautzen
- Gondwana - Das Praehistorium in Schiffweiler, opened 2008
- Dinosaur Land (Rügen) on Rügen, opened 2008
- Traumlandpark 1977–1991 in Bottrop-Kirchhellen, then incorporated into the Bavaria Filmpark as DinoPark
- Germendorf Wildlife Park in Germendorf. Park opened in 2002, dinosaur park section (Urzeitpark) opened in 2009
- Dinosaur Park Teufelsschlucht in Ernzen, opened 2015

=== Greece ===
- Dinosauria Park near Heraklion, Crete
- Dino Park Greece near Nea Moudania, Halkidiki

=== Italy ===
- Prehistoric Park, Rivolta d'Adda
- World of Dinosaurs, San Piero a Sieve
- Parco Preistorico, Peccioli
- Extinction Park at Parco Natura Viva, Bussolengo
- Parco della Preistoria Lost World at Atlantis Parco Acquatico, San Secondo of Pinerolo
- Parco Preistorico, Peccioli
- Dinopark, Avezzano
- Dino Park, San Lorenzello
- Parco Il Mondo della Preistoria, Simbario
- Parco dei Dinosauri, Castellana Grotte
- Parco delle Grotte di Famosa e la Grotta dei Dinosauri, Massafra
- Parco della Preistoria at Etnaland, Belpasso
- Parco dinosauri at Safari Park, Pombia

=== Lithuania ===
- "Dino parkas" at Radailiai, Klaipeda region

=== Montenegro ===
- DinoSecrets Adventure Park in Budva.

=== Netherlands ===
- Dierenpark Amersfoort, Amersfoort. Regular zoo with large 'DinoPark' section.
- Dinoland Zwolle, Zwolle.
- Oertijdmuseum, Boxtel.
- Duinrell, Wassenaar. Amusement park that is 'dinosaur-themed' in October.
- Dino Experience Park, Gouda.

=== North Macedonia ===
- Dinosaur Park, Skopje, opened 2021.
- Avanturisticko - adrenalinski park, Dino park, Shtip, opened 2025.

=== Poland ===
- Dinosaur parks and Miniature park in Wrocław
- Bałtów Jurassic Park in Ostrowiec County
- Dinozatorland in Zator
- JuraPark in Krasiejów
- JuraPark in Solec Kujawski
- Dinozaury-Krasnobród EducationPark in Krasnobród www.dinozaury-krasnobrod.pl

=== Portugal ===
- Dino Parque da Lourinhã, Lourinhã, opened in 2018

=== Romania ===
- Dino Park in Rasnov opened 2015

=== Russia ===
- Dino Park Skazka in Moscow
- Dino Park Etnomir in Moscow Oblast
- Dino Park in Magnitogorsk
- Dino at Safari-park in Krasnodar
- Dino Park Rex in Stavropol

=== Serbia ===
- DINO PARK, Novi Sad, to be opened in April 2016

=== Slovakia ===
- DinoPark Zoo Bratislava in Bratislava, opened in 2004
- DinoPark Zoo Košice in Košice, opened in 2013
- Dino Adventure Park in Terchová, opened in 2012
- Dino Adventure Park in Bojnice, opened in 2013

=== Spain ===
- Dinopark, Playa de Palma, Mallorca
- DinoPark Algar, Callosa d'en Sarrià
- Dinópolis, Teruel, Aragón.

=== Switzerland ===
- Saurierpark in Réclère, with dripstone cave in Réclère

=== United Kingdom ===
- Blackpool Zoo's Dinosaur Safari in Blackpool, Lancashire
- Jurassic Journey, Great Yarmouth, Norfolk
- West Midland Safari Park - Land of the Living Dinosaurs
- Crystal Palace Dinosaurs, opened 1854, in London on the site of the Crystal Palace
- Combe Martin Wildlife and Dinosaur park in North Devon
- Dinosaur Adventure Park, Lenwade, Norfolk
- Teessaurus Park, Middlesbrough
- The Dinosaur Park Tenby, Pembrokeshire
- National Showcaves Centre for Wales, Brecon Beacons
- Blair Drummond Safari Park near Stirling
- Edinburgh Zoo

== Americas ==
=== Brazil ===
- Alchymist Prehistoric Park, Caucaia, Ceará, opened in 2024
- Terra dos Dinos, Miguel Pereira, Rio de Janeiro
- Parque dos Dinossauros, Parelhas, Rio Grande do Norte
- Vale dos Dinossauros, Canela, Rio Grande do Sul

=== Canada ===
- Wilder Institute/Calgary Zoo in Calgary, Alberta, opened 1937. About 50 life-sized sculptures by 1960, including non-dinosaurs. Renovated in 1987, and most models replaced.
- Indian River Reptile and Dinosaur Park, Otonabee–South Monaghan
- Royal Tyrrell Museum of Palaeontology, 6 km from Drumheller, Alberta
- Jurassic Forest, north of Gibbons, Alberta
- Budapest Park, Toronto, Ontario - Contains a statue of a Stegosaurus and Chasmosaurus.
- Muskoka Dinosaur Land, Utterson, Ontario - permanently closed
- Dinosaur Provincial Park, Alberta
- Prehistoric World, Morrisburg, Ontario - Over 50 life sized dinosaurs.
- Dinosaurs Alive!, Vaughan, Ontario. Located inside Wonderland, featured more than 40 life size animatronic dinosaurs before closing in 2019.

=== United States ===
- Dinosaur World, Beaver, Arkansas (1960s-2005)
- Cabazon Dinosaurs, Cabazon, California
- The Dinosaur Place at Nature's Art Village in Montville, Connecticut
- Dinosaur State Park and Arboretum in Rocky Hill, Connecticut
- DinoLand U.S.A. at Disney's Animal Kingdom Park in Bay Lake, Florida (1998–2025). The whole park is not dedicated to dinosaurs, but this land is.
- Jurassic Park at Universal's Islands of Adventure in Orlando, Florida. The whole park is not dedicated to dinosaurs, but this land is.
- Dinosaur World, Plant City, Florida, opened 1998
- Bongoland, Port Orange, Florida, now part of the Dunlawton Plantation and Sugar Mill
- Field Station: Dinosaurs, Derby, Kansas, opened in 2018.
- Dinosaur World, Cave City, Kentucky
- Dinosaur Gardens Prehistorical Zoo, Ossineke, Michigan, opened 1930s
- Field Station: Dinosaurs, Overpeck County Park, Bergen County, New Jersey. Was originally located in Secacus.
- Dinosaur Playground, Riverside Park, New York City. Has two fiberglass dinosaurs.
- Dinosaurs Alive at Cedar Point Amusement Park, Sandusky, Ohio (2012–2018)
- Prehistoric Gardens, Port Orford, Oregon, opened 1955. Has at least 16 full-sized models, including non-dinosaurs.
- Dinosaur Park in Rapid City, South Dakota, opened 1936
- Dinosaur Park in Bluff City, Tennessee with over 40 dinosaur sculptures
- Dinosaur Park, Cedar Creek, Texas
- Dinosaur World, Glen Rose, Texas
- George S. Eccles Dinosaur Park, Ogden, Utah over 100 life sized prehistoric creatures, a functioning paleontology lab, and a fossil and gemstone museum.
- Dinosaur Kingdom II, Natural Bridge, Virginia, featuring 30 dinosaur sculptures in a fantasy U.S. Civil-War-themed setting
- Jerrassic Park at Military Aviation Museum, Virginia Beach, Virginia
- Dinosaur Land, White Post, Virginia, opened 1963, over 50 dinosaur sculptures
- Hisey Park, Granger, Washington

=== Cuba ===
- Valle de la Prehistoria, in the Baconao Park outside of Santiago de Cuba, opened in the 1980s.

=== Guatemala ===
- Dino Park, Santa Cruz Muluá, Quetzaltenango, Guatemala

== Asia ==
=== Cambodia ===
- Dinosaurs Alive, Phnom Penh

=== India ===
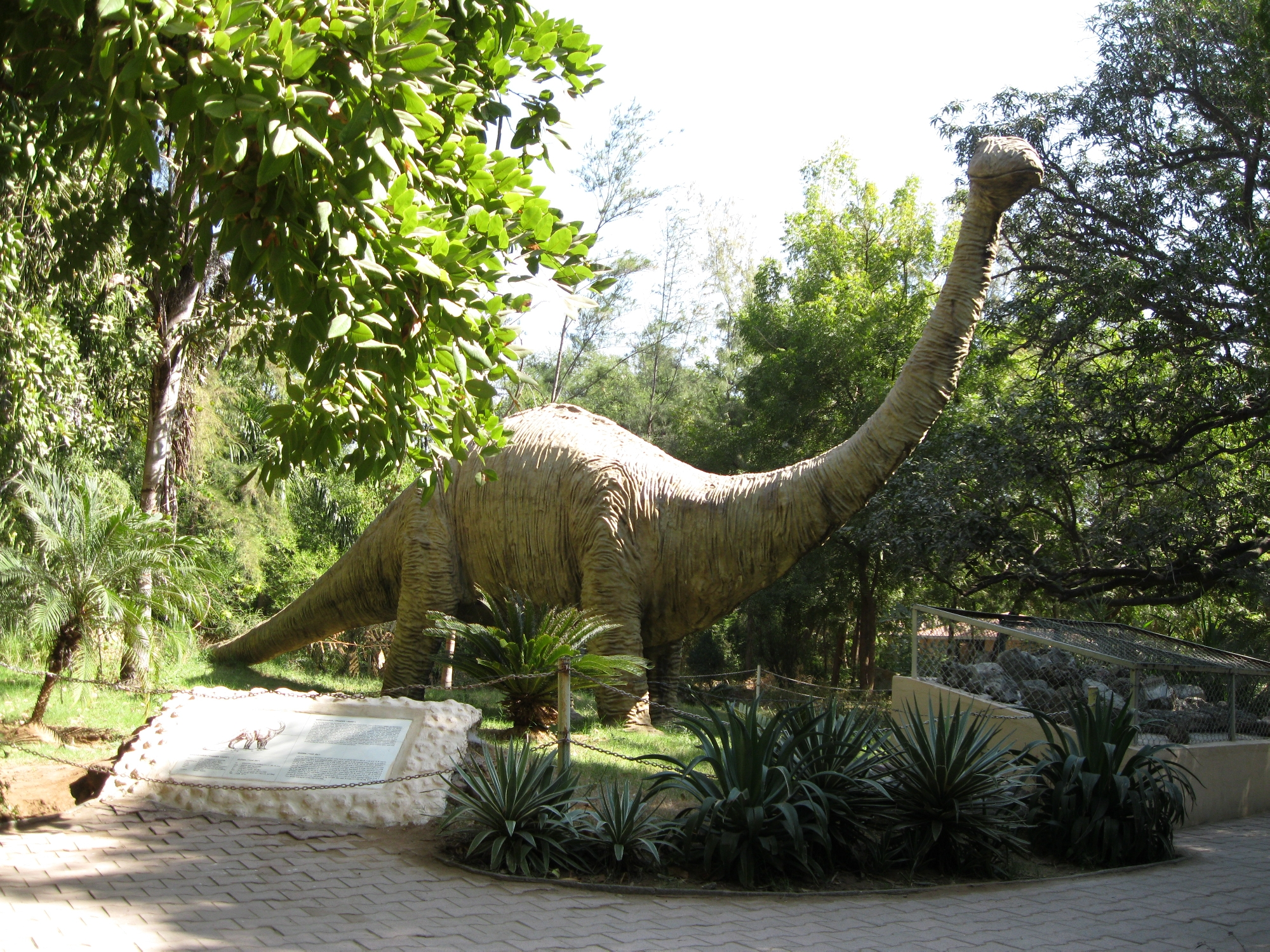
Indroda Dinosaur and Fossil Park, Gandhinagar, Gujarat

- Indroda Dinosaur and Fossil Park, Gandhinagar, Gujarat
- Dinosaur Fossil Park, Raiyoli, Balasinor, Gujarat

=== Indonesia ===
- Dinosaur Adventure, Taman Mini Indonesia Indah
- Jawa Timur Park 3, Batu, East Java

=== Lebanon ===
- Dino city - Prehistoric Park at Ajaltoun, Mount Lebanon, Lebanon

=== Pakistan ===
Dino valley. Located in Margalla Hills National Park, it is the first dinosaur theme park of Pakistan.

=== Thailand ===
- Si Wiang Dinosaur Park, Wiang Kao District, Khon Kaen Province
- Dinosaur Valley at Nong Nooch Tropical Garden, Chonburi Province

=== Iran ===
- Jurassic park, Khorasane-razavi, Mashhad

== Australia ==
- Palmersaurus at Palmer Coolum Resort. Opened 14 December 2013

== See also ==
- Jurassic Park (novel)
- Jurassic Park (film)
- List of films featuring dinosaurs
