= Molfetta =

- Comune
- Città di Molfetta
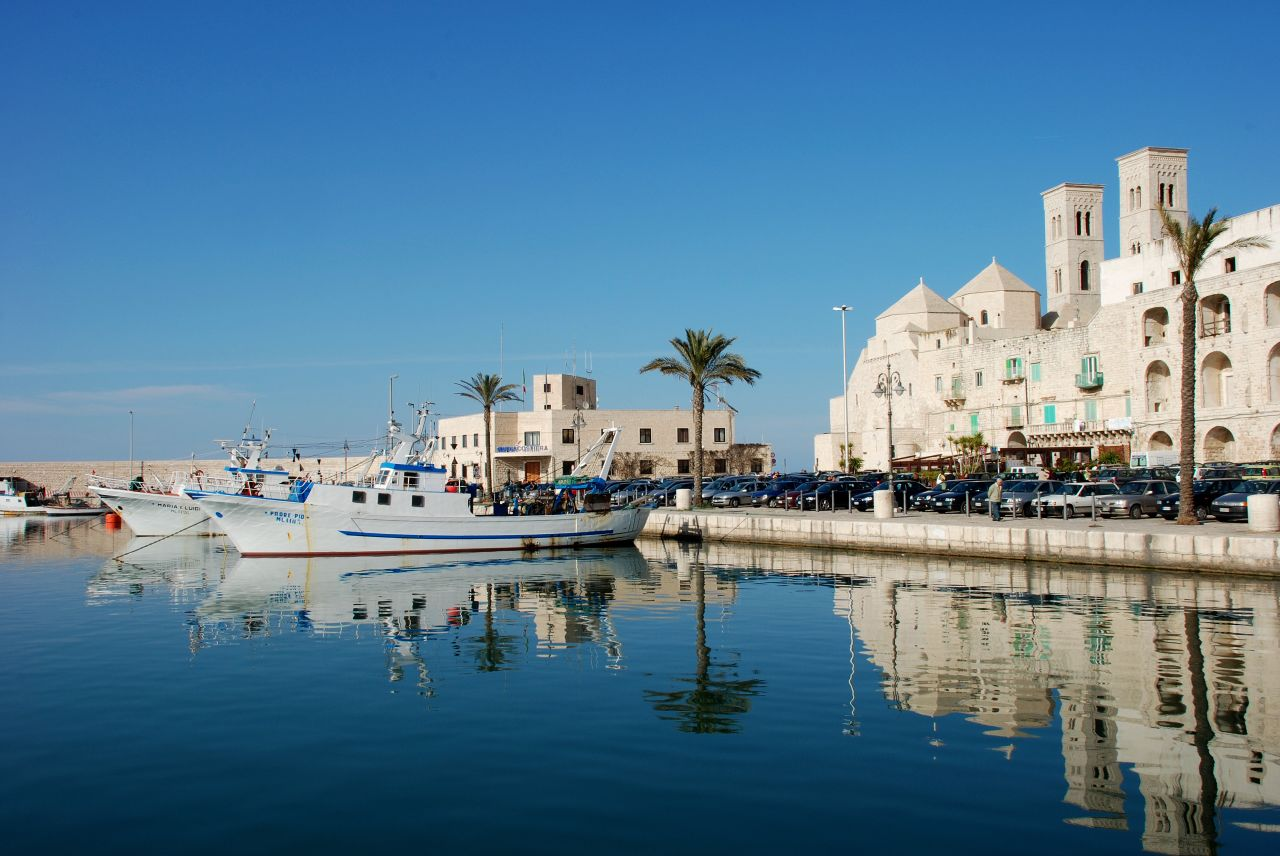
- Molfetta Harbour

- Coat of arms

- Molfetta within the Province of Bari

- Location within Italy Location within Apulia
- Coordinates: 41°12′N 16°36′E
- Country: Italy
- Region: Apulia
- Metropolitan city: Bari (BA)

Government
  - Mayor: Manuel Minervini (PRC)

Area
  - Total: 58.26 km^{2} (22.49 sq mi)
- Elevation: 18 m (59 ft)

Population (31 December 2022)
  - Total: 57 329
  - Density: 0.98/km^{2} (2.5/sq mi)
- Demonym: Molfettesi
- Time zone: UTC+1 (CET)
  - Summer (DST): UTC+2 (CEST)
- Postal code: 70056
- Dialing code: 080
- ISTAT code: 072029
- Patron saint: San Corrado di Baviera, Madonna dei Martiri
- Saint day: 9 February, 8 September
- Website: Official website

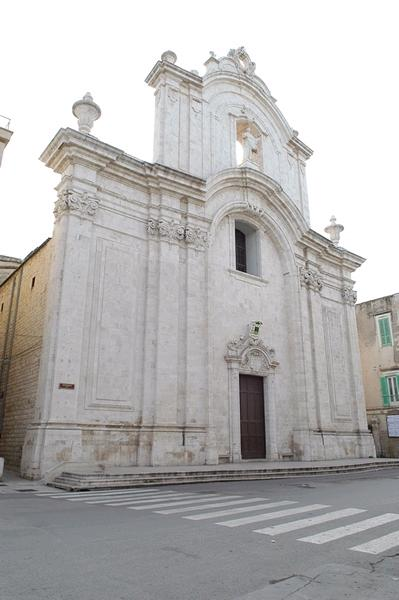
Molfetta Cathedral, or Church of Santa Maria Assunta

Molfetta (Italian: [molˈfetta]; Molfettese: Melfétte) is a town located in the northern side of the Metropolitan City of Bari, Apulia, southern Italy.

It has a well restored old city, and its own dialect.

== History ==
The earliest local signs of permanent habitation are at the Neolithic site of Pulo, one of the most important such sites in southern Italy. The origins of the city can be traced to a small fishing port; antique graves testify to a fisherman's village in the fourth century BC. The position of the future city offered a valid landing to the commerce of Roman Rubo. The first indication of a toponym on the coast between Turenum (Trani) and Natiolum (Giovinazzo) is in the Itinerarium Provinciarum Antonini Augusti, edited from a third-century core. The place denominated Respa was probably a wrong transcript of the toponym Melpha, referring to a small village of fishermen.

The first official document that mentions the city dates to November 925; it documents a civitas denominated Melfi, situated on a peninsula named Sant'Andrea. The city developed under Byzantine dominion, and was later conquered by the Lombards, who included it in the Duchy of Benevento. The city repelled repeated assaults by the Emirate of Bari. As an independent seaport, Molfetta traded with other Mediterranean markets, including Venice, Alexandria, Constantinople, Syria, Amalfi and Ragusa.

At the beginning of the 11th century the Normans arrived, and the autonomy that the city preserved helped foster its development as both a commercial port with the east, and as port of embarcation for pilgrims heading to the Holy Land. The Crusades permitted the city to assume a wider importance. Among the many pilgrims was Conrad of Bavaria, who was so enamoured of the city that he became venerated as San Corrado, the protecting saint of Molfetta. During the Angevin dominion the city succeeded in remaining autonomous. However, the arrival of the Aragonese kingdom to Southern Italy, spurred turbulent struggles between French, Spanish and Italians. These wars provoked death and destruction in the whole south of Italy: the Sack of Molfetta at the hands of the French, 18–19 July 1529, was an episode that stalled the economic rebirth of the city.

In February 2006, Molfetta hosted International Youth Parliament, an event which took place the previous year in Canterbury.

== Geography ==
Located in the north-western corner of its province, near the borders with the one of Barletta-Andria-Trani, and by the Adriatic Coast, Molfetta borders with the municipalities of Bisceglie (BT), Giovinazzo, Terlizzi and Ruvo di Puglia. The town is 27 km from Andria, 31 from Barletta and 34 from Bari.

== Main sights ==
- Il Pulo is one of the most important Neolithic sites of southern Italy. It is a circular cave 23 metres (75 ft) deep with grottoes and remains of old constructions.
- The Old Cathedral (it:Duomo di San Corrado) was built in the twelfth–thirteenth centuries in Apulian-Romanesque style, using local stone on a basilica plan, a nave with two aisles divided by four central cross-shaped pilasters. The floor has two domes. From the apse area rise two 20-metre (66 ft) towers, one of which acted as watchtower, the other has the usual campanile. The interior has some notable religious furnishings from the sixteenth century.
- Several watchtowers, such as the Torre Calderina (fifteenth century) on the seaside, and the Torrione Passari, inglobated in the town's walls.
- The New Cathedral, or church of S. Maria Assunta in Cielo, was built by the Jesuits from 1610. It houses the remains of the city's patron, San Corrado of Bavaria, in a silver reliquary bust of the saint (seventeenth century) by G. Todaro.
- The church of San Bernardino da Siena (1451, rebuilt in 1585) includes a triptych by Duccio d'Andrea (fifteenth century) and other later paintings. Notable is the Renaissance choir. The annexed convent is now the Palazzo Civico (town hall).
- The church of Santo Stefano, built from 1286, but with a Renaissance stone façade added in 1586.
- Palazzo Giovene is a 16th-century palace, now used as Town Hall. It has a notable Renaissance style portal.
- The church of Santa Maria Consolatrice degli Afflitti, simply known as Chiesa del Purgatorio, dating from 1643 and consecrated in 1667. The façade has statues representing Sts. Stephen, Peter, Paul and Lawrence and, on the two side summits, those of St. Joaquim and St. Anne. The interior houses paintings by Bernardo Cavallino and native-son Corrado Giaquinto.
- The church of San Pietro Apostolo, simply called "San Pietro's Church", just existing in the twelfth century, but with the actual Baroque façade and bell tower, situated in the old town, at the begin of the street of the some name, near the Municipio Square.
- The Temple of Calvary, a small Neo-Gothic construction built in 1856 and designed by the local architect Corrado De Judicibus.
- Two km outside the city in the direction of Bisceglie, is the basilica-sanctuary of the Madonna dei Martiri. The current nave of the church is partially built over the old eleventh-century church, of which only a dome and the underlying structure remain, in today's altar area. Annexed is the Crusaders Hospital, also from the eleventh century. The basilica conserves an image that was a votive gift of some Crusaders in 1188.
- The Molfetta Lighthouse on the eastern pier; still active today.

== Notable people ==
- Angelo Amato, cardinal
- Leonardo Andriani, immigrant
- Rossella Biscotti, artist
- Caparezza, rapper
- Luigi Capotorti, 19th-century composer
- Giulio Cozzoli, professor in Accademia di Belle Arti di Napoli
- Ignazio Gadaleta, painter and teacher in Brera Academy
- Corrado Giaquinto, Rococo painter
- Domenico Leccisi, notorious for stealing Mussolini's corpse
- Girolamo Minervini, assassinated magistrate
- Riccardo Muti, conductor
- Gaetano Salvemini, anti-fascist politician and writer
- Giuseppe Saverio Poli (1746–1825), physicist, biologist and natural historian.
- Vitangelo Spadavecchia, goalkeeper

== Migration ==
During the times of the mass migration of Italians, mainly following World War II, many Molfettese residents migrated to Fremantle in Western Australia and to a town in South Australia called Port Pirie. The culture of Molfetta is celebrated in Fremantle and Port Pirie. Officials of both Port Pirie and Molfetta have close links today.

In the United States, many Molfettese immigrants settled in the city of Hoboken, New Jersey, where a substantial enclave still exists today. The largest number of Italian immigrants in Hoboken came from Molfetta. In the 1920s, a Society Madonna dei Martiri was established in Hoboken by Molfettese immigrants, which continues to celebrate the Feast of Madonna dei Martiri as part of the annual Hoboken Italian Festival.

== See also ==
- Molfetta railway station
- Molfetta Lighthouse
