= Dinosaur Planet =

Dinosaur Planet may refer to:

- Dinosaur Planet (novel), a science fiction novel by Anne McCaffrey
- Dinosaur Planet, a science fiction novel by Stephen Leigh, book 1 of 6 in his Dinosaur World series
- Dinosaur Planet, a cancelled video game by Rare which was later adapted as Star Fox Adventures
- Dinosaur Planet (TV series), a television series made by Discovery Channel
- Planet of Dinosaurs, a 1977 film
- Dinosaur Planet, a concept album by MJ Hibbett

== See also ==
- Planet Dinosaur, a six-part documentary television miniseries produced by the BBC
- Dinosaur World (disambiguation)
