= Meadowview Psychiatric Hospital =

Coordinates: 40.7831°N 74.0588°W

Geography
- Location: Secaucus, New Jersey, United States

Organization
- Type: Psychiatric

Services
- Beds: 87

History
- Founded: 1864

Links
- Website: http://www.hudsoncountynj.org/hudson-county-meadowview-psychiatric-hospital/
- Lists: Hospitals in the United States

Meadowview Psychiatric Hospital is a hospital in Secaucus, New Jersey.

Founded as the Hudson County Hospital for the Insane 1864, the hospital was originally located on Snake Hill. In 1927 its patients were moved to a new facility on County Avenue (where Meadowview Hospital is now located) and its name was changed to Hudson County Hospital Mental Diseases. They were transported in buses and ambulances, according to a contemporary Newark Evening News article.

When the asylum originally opened it had a capacity of 140 patients. Different wings were designated for men and women, and each room held several beds. Patients were not limited to the mentally ill. Justification ranged from schizophrenia to syphilis. Many people were admitted to the hospital "who had no reason to be there: healthy residents who had been determined by their relatives to be a burden." Sometimes families signed in their elderly relatives when they could no longer afford to take care of them. At the time, it was not difficult to sign in a patient, but harder for one to leave the hospital. According to Secaucus Town Historian Dan McDonough, "Anybody could sign somebody in. However, you would need three doctors to sign you out." The causes of death of many patients were not recorded, because the patients had been given pauper's funeral in the potter's field on the grounds, which was known as the Hudson County Burial Grounds. The Hudson County Hospital for Mental Diseases was renamed Hudson County Meadowview Hospital in 1967.

Meadowview Hospital was the victim of serious neglect, losing state funding and license in the 1990s and in 1995 services were contracted out. The hospital began a slow road to recovery and in 2011 became an accredited mental health facility. Currently, the hospital only accepts patients referred from Acute Care Hospitals and offers 84 beds with inpatient treatment and serves the residents of Hudson and surrounding counties.
