= Dinosaur Land (Rügen) =

Miniature park

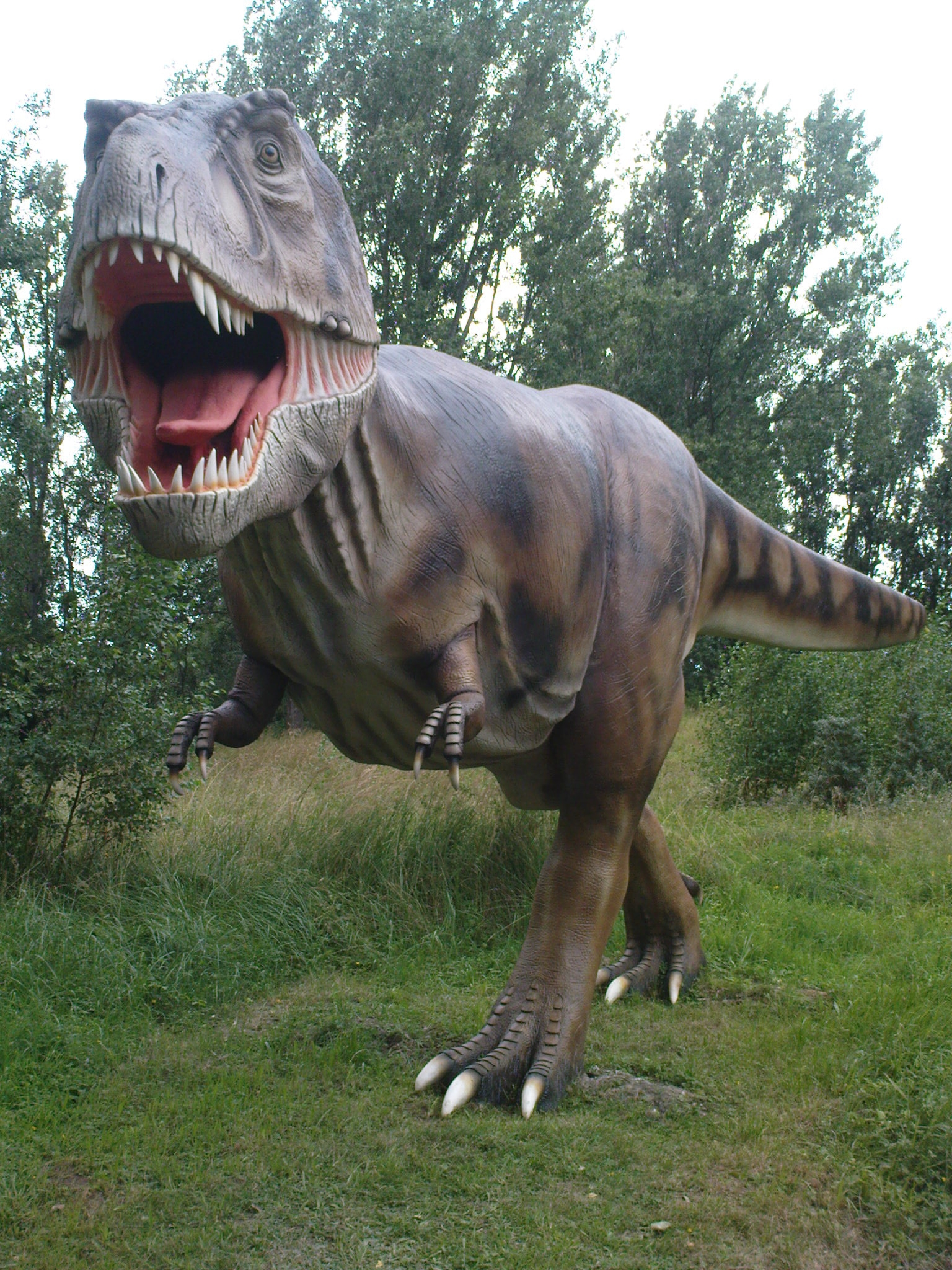
- A Tyrannosaurus rex at Dinosaur Land, 2009

- Location within Germany
- Location: Rügen, Germany
- Coordinates: 54°33′49″N 13°31′32″E
- Opened: 30 April 2008
- Website: dinosaurierland-ruegen.de

Dinosaur Land on the German island of Rügen (German: Dinosaurierland Rügen) was opened by Rüdiger Kunkel on 30 April 2008 on land that had belonged to the East German National People's Army (NVA). The site covers an area of 9.5 hectares in the municipality of Glowe and is not far from the villages of Spycker and Bobbin on Lake Spycker.

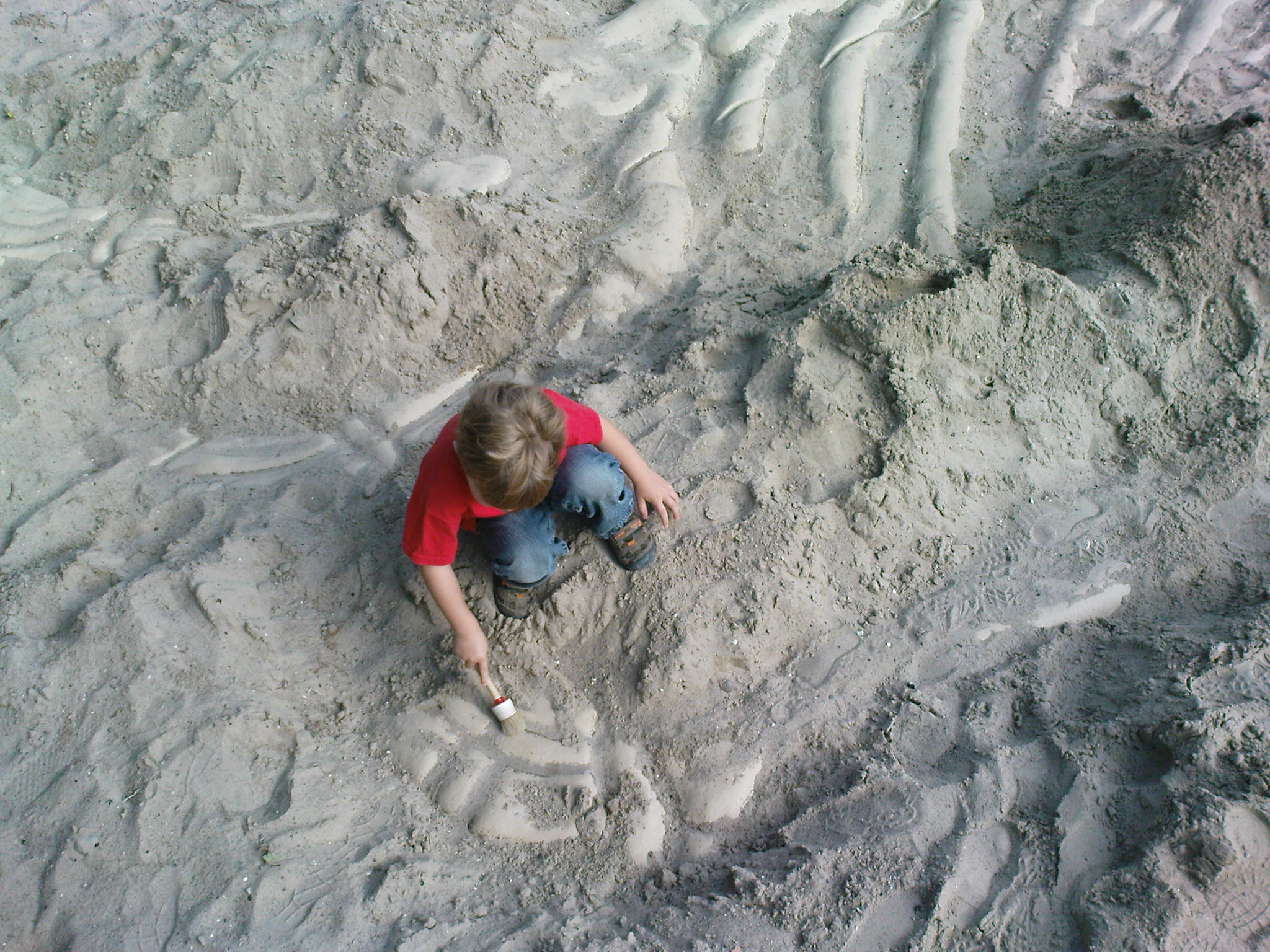
Simulated archaeological excavations at Dinosaur Land, 2009

The focus of the park is its display of dinosaur models, each with an information board. In addition there are models of prehistoric fish, marine mammals and the odd turtles, hominids, mammoths and sabre-toothed tigers.

The models are made of glass-reinforced plastics (GFP) and are made by hand. At the time of opening there were around 1000 of these models displayed on a roughly 800 metre long circular walk. The largest has a height of twelve metres and a length of 27 metres and represents Diplodocus. In early 2009 the circular walk was extended to 1,100 metres with around 120 exhibits. This expansion had an emphasis on marine life.

The park also offers various activities, for example, a simulated archaeological dig on a dinosaur skeleton using shoves and brushes, as well as searching for fossils in the remains of a chalk pit.

== See also ==
- List of dinosaur parks
