= Girolamo Minervini =

Italian magistrate

Girolamo Minervini (Molfetta, 4 May 1919 – Rome, 18 March 1980) was an Italian magistrate who was assassinated by the Red Brigades (Brigate Rosse; BR), a Marxist-Leninist terrorist organisation that committed a number of atrocities and murders during the Anni di piombo (Years of Lead).

== Murder ==
Minervini was the victim of an attack by the Red Brigades in Rome, the day after taking up a new position as Director General of the Institutes of Prevention and Punishment at the Ministry of Justice. Two young Brigatisti, Francesco Piccioni and Sandro Padula, found Minervini aboard a bus in Via Ruggero di Lauria, travelling on his way to work without an escort so as not to put other people's lives at risk. He was slain in front of dozens of fellow passengers (of whom only one has since provided testimony), while three others were injured. Piccioni and Padula were identified as Minervini's killers during trial proceedings years later.

Minervini was, in addition to his judicial duties, a legal advisor to ISTAT, General Secretary of the National Center of Prevention and Social Defense, President of the Institute of Penitentiary Studies, member of the Superior Council of the Judiciary, Deputy Director General of the Prevention and Penal Institutes, and Deputy Prosecutor General of the Supreme Court of Cassation.

== Bibliography ==
- "Girolamo Minervini, magistrato" by the Associazione Italiana Vittime del Terrorismo
