= Dinosaur Gardens =

Dinosaur themed tourist attraction in Michigan

Coordinates: 44.916939°N 83.439381°W

The park entrance

Dinosaur Gardens is a tourist attraction in Ossineke, Michigan, United States. Built on a 40-acre (160,000 m^{2}) tract of drained swampland, visitors encounter several dozen home-made sculptures of dinosaurs, prehistoric birds, prehistoric mammals, and cavemen. The attraction was started by folk artist Paul N. Domke in 1935. There is also a gift shop and a dinosaur-themed miniature golf course on the premises.

A dinosaur sculpture

Dinosaur Gardens is perhaps best known for its seemingly out-of-place Christian imagery. For example, visitors are greeted at the entrance by a statue of Jesus holding a globe in his left hand. The belly of a Brontosaurus sculpture on the property includes a display proclaiming Jesus as “The Greatest Heart”.

== See also ==
- List of dinosaur parks
