= Molfetta Lighthouse =

Molfetta
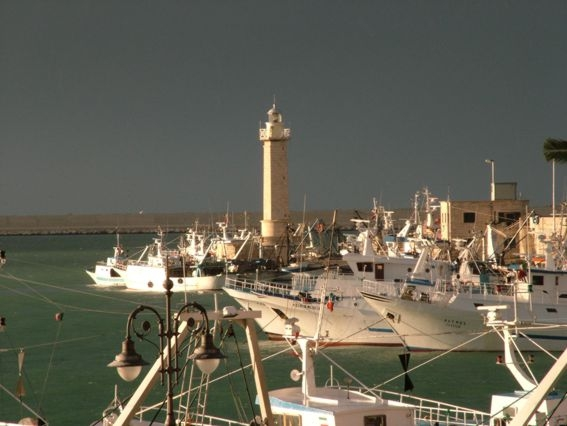
- Molfetta Lighthouse
- Location: Molfetta; Apulia; Italy
- Coordinates: 41°12′29″N 16°35′39″E

Tower
- Constructed: 1857
- Construction: stone tower
- Automated: yes
- Height: 18 metres (59 ft)
- Shape: tapered octagonal prism tower with balcony and lantern
- Markings: white tower, grey metallic lantern dome
- Power source: mains electricity
- Operator: Marina Militare

Light
- Focal height: 22 metres (72 ft)
- Lens: Type LP2
- Intensity: AL 1000 W
- Range: main: 16 nautical miles (30 km; 18 mi) reserve: 12 nautical miles (22 km; 14 mi)
- Characteristic: Iso W 6s.
- Italy no.: 3752 E.F.

Molfetta Lighthouse (Italian: Faro di Molfetta) is an active lighthouse located on the elbow of the east pier of the harbour of Molfetta, in Apulia on the Adriatic Sea.

== Description ==
The lighthouse was built in 1857 and consists of a white tapered octagonal prism stone tower, 18 feet (5.5 m) high, with balcony and lantern, rising from a 1-storey white circular keeper's house. The lantern, painted in grey metallic, is positioned at 22 metres (72 ft) above sea level and emits one white flash on and off in a 6 seconds period, visible up to a distance of 16 nautical miles (30 km; 18 mi). The lighthouse is completely automated and is managed by the Marina Militare with the identification code number 3752 E.F.

== See also ==
- List of lighthouses in Italy
- Molfetta
