= Dinosauria Park =

Dinosaur park in Crete, Greece

Coordinates: 35.32684°N 25.28790°E

Dinosauria Park (Greek: Ο Κόσμος των Δεινοσαύρων, O Kosmos ton Dinosauron) is a dinosaur park located near the town of Gournes in Crete, Greece, 15 kilometres (9.3 mi) east of the city of Heraklion. The park features some fossil replicas and several animatronic dinosaur models. Dinosaur models are displayed along an approximately 500 metres (1,600 ft) long walk, each accompanied by an information board.

The Dinosauria Park started as an idea in 2013 and was first housed in Gournes Δekk, located in the former American base. It displayed 30 different dinosaur species from all periods of the Mesozoic era and other prehistoric animals.

In 2014 the exhibits were transferred to their own space, in which they were displayed in what would have been their natural environment. New species of dinosaurs were added, along with new sections, such as a "dinosaur hospital", depicting the hatching of a dinosaur egg. A "5D" cinema screen shows films to visitors.

== See also ==
- List of dinosaur parks
- Cretaquarium
