= Prehistoric Gardens =

Roadside attraction in coastal Oregon

- Location: Port Orford, Oregon, United States
- Coordinates: 42.6123672°N 124.3926855°W
- Status: Operating
- Opened: 1955
- Owner: Kiki McGrath
- Area: 33 acres (13 ha)

Prehistoric Gardens is a roadside attraction located on Oregon's Highway 101 Coastal Route. Founded in 1955 in Port Orford, the gardens feature 23 life-sized sculptures of dinosaurs set among the lush foliage of the area's temperate rainforest. The gardens are the work of amateur paleontologist E.V. "Ernie" Nelson; the site is run by Nelson's granddaughter.

== Description ==
Prehistoric Gardens consists of 23 life-sized dinosaurs. The sculptures are created with a steel frame base and sculpted with mesh-like metal lath and concrete. The largest sculpture is an 86-foot-long brachiosaurus. Signs provide information about each of the dinosaurs represented, as well as plants indigenous to the area. While the sculptures are anatomically accurate, the paint colors were chosen to be fanciful and photogenic.

A small gift shop sells dinosaur related merchandise along with products such as fossils and agates. Approximately 200 people visit the site every day in the busier summer months.

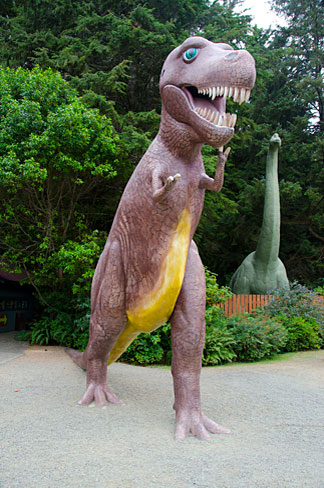
A Tyrannosaurus and Brachiosaurus welcome visitors to Prehistoric Gardens

== History ==
E.V. Nelson grew up on a farm in Minnesota and as a child he was passionate about dinosaurs and natural history. He dreamed of becoming an artist, and was offered a position as a cartoonist at Walt Disney Studios, but chose a job as an accountant to ensure financial security for his family during the Great Depression. He owned a mill machinery supply business and worked as a Certified Public Accountant, until, in the early 1950s, he decided to make his childhood dream of a prehistoric park come true. In 1953 he and his wife sold his accounting business and their home in Eugene and bought 77 acres of land in coastal Oregon.

Nelson visited natural history museums across the U.S. and consulted with paleontologists to create drawings of skeletal remains and fossils in order to create scientifically correct models. Nelson spent three years researching anatomy and designing the initial dinosaurs. He created five dinosaurs in the first two years of business; it took him 30 years to create the 23 dinosaurs in the park. Prehistoric Gardens opened January 1, 1955. The initial admission prices were 50 cents for adults and 25 cents for children.

Nelson ran the site until his death at age 91 in 1999. Nelson's granddaughter Kiki McGrath inherited the park and continues running the attraction. Prehistoric Gardens was featured on a 2017 episode of Strange Inheritance, a Fox Business Network reality television show, focusing on the history of the park and Nelson's family's choice in continuing to run the park or selling the land.

== See also ==
- List of dinosaur parks
