= Paul N. Domke =

American businessman

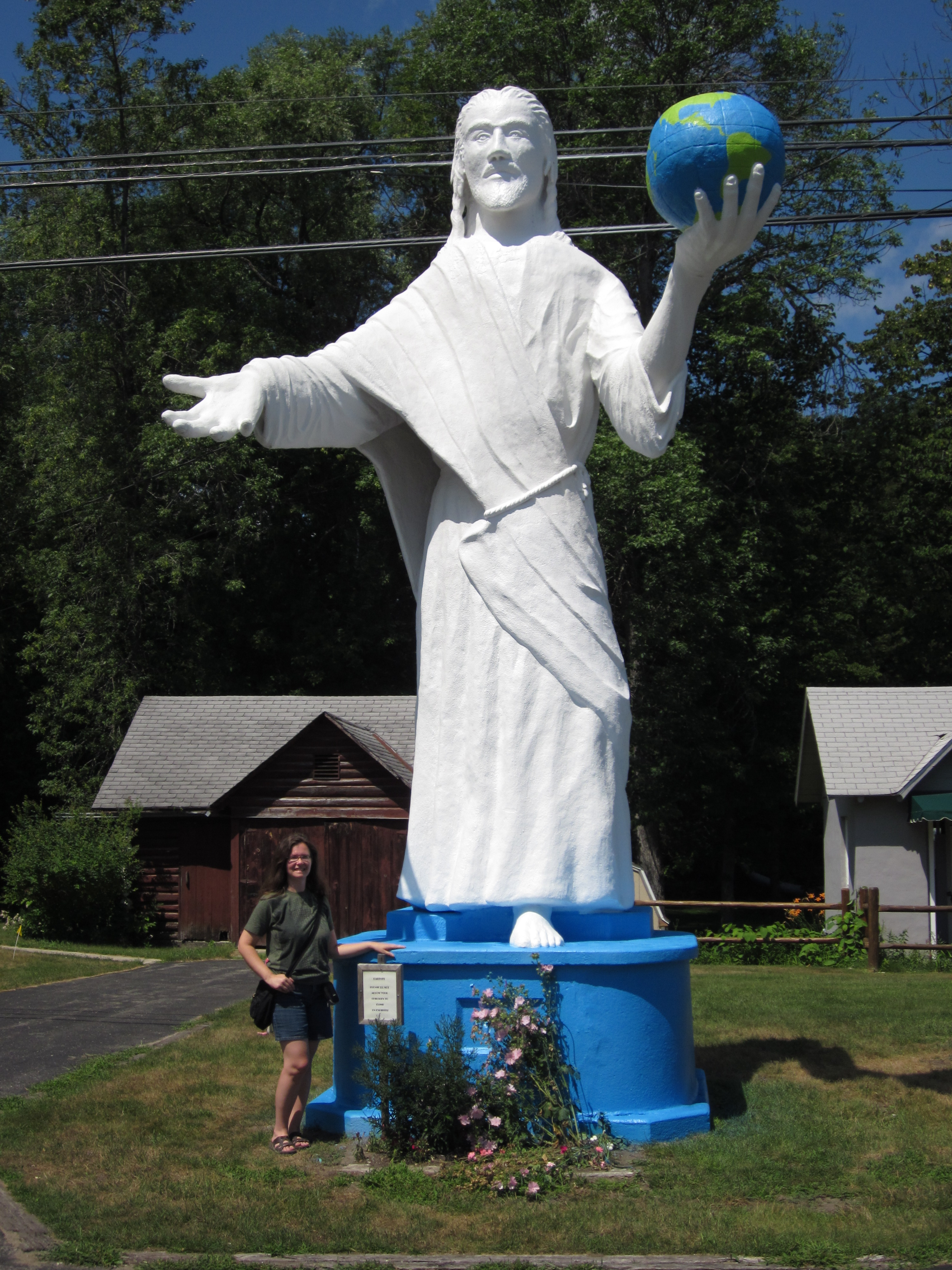
Jesus (1957) by Paul Domke

Paul N. Domke (born December 31, 1885, Moltke Township, Michigan) founded Domke's Prehistorical Gardens (now Dinosaur Gardens Prehistorical Zoo) in 1935 in Ossineke, Michigan. This tourist attraction primarily showcases dinosaurs sculpted by Domke, who was a self-trained artist.

Paul Nathan Domke was born to Prussian immigrants, Carl and Augusta Domke. He attended Wartburg College in Clinton, Iowa from 1903 to 1906, in preparation for seminary study to become a Lutheran pastor. However, Domke abandoned his studies after the summer of 1906 and joined the U.S. Navy. He became a member of the medical corps and for the first two years of his service, he trained on the U.S.S. Hartford and worked at the Naval Hospital in Annapolis, Maryland. He traveled extensively while in the service.

After his stint in the Navy, Domke returned home to Michigan and worked on the family farm. In 1913, Domke married a local woman, Lora Schultz. The couple lived in Detroit for a while and Domke found work in a painting firm that specialized in decorating churches. During the Great Depression, the company folded and Domke found himself out of work. He purchased some swampy acreage outside Ossineke to set into motion his dream of self-employment.

Domke initially opened a gas station on his land, as it abutted U.S. 23, and added some tourist cabins. However, his main goal was to create a natural history park. Domke stated that, "our country has very elaborate and expensive zoos of our present animal life, but of prehistoric life, although much has been found, only a little has been placed before the general public." So starting in 1935 Domke had his land drained, cleared, and trails constructed in preparation for the park. He also began experimenting with various formulas to construct his durable waterproof dinosaurs, with the help of the Huron Portland Cement Company. From 1935 to 1976 Domke constructed 24 exhibits at his Prehistorical Gardens. This roadside attraction also included a gift shop that sold snacks and souvenirs.

Domke sold the Prehistorical Gardens in 1959, yet continued to create new dinosaur installations at the park. He was also a prolific oil painter, who as a devout Lutheran often painted on religious themes. In 1953 Domke sculpted a large Babe the Blue Ox, which stands next to a Paul Bunyan statue, now located near Ossineke.

Domke died on October 27, 1981, at Alpena General Hospital in Alpena, Michigan, aged 95.

== See also ==
- Richard Kishel made similar larger-than-life giants in Muncie, Indiana.
- Bill Swan (Sculpture artist) also made similar giants in California.
