= Ignazio Gadaleta =

Italian painter

Ignazio Gadaleta (born 1958) is an Italian painter.

== Gallery ==
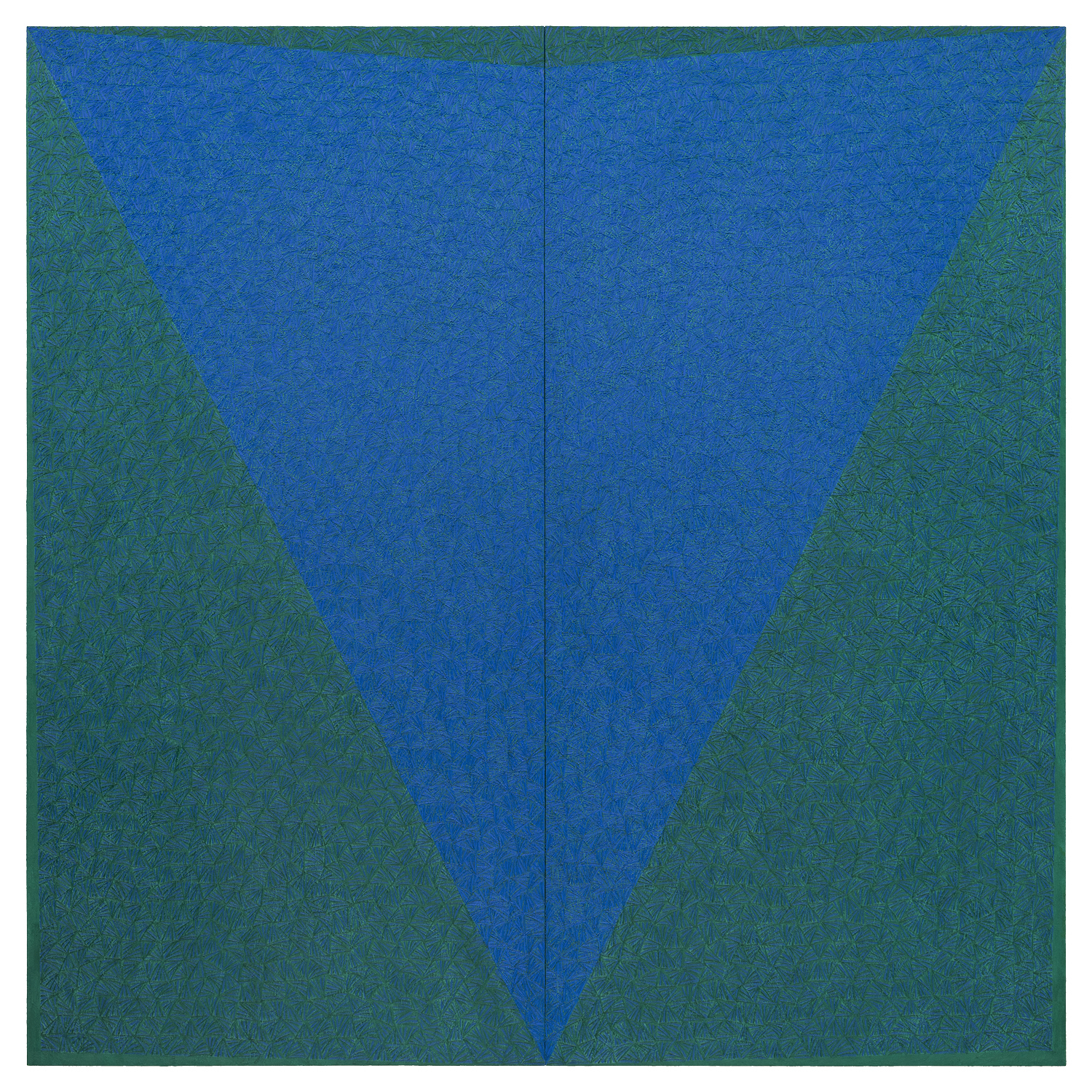
Assunzione, 1988

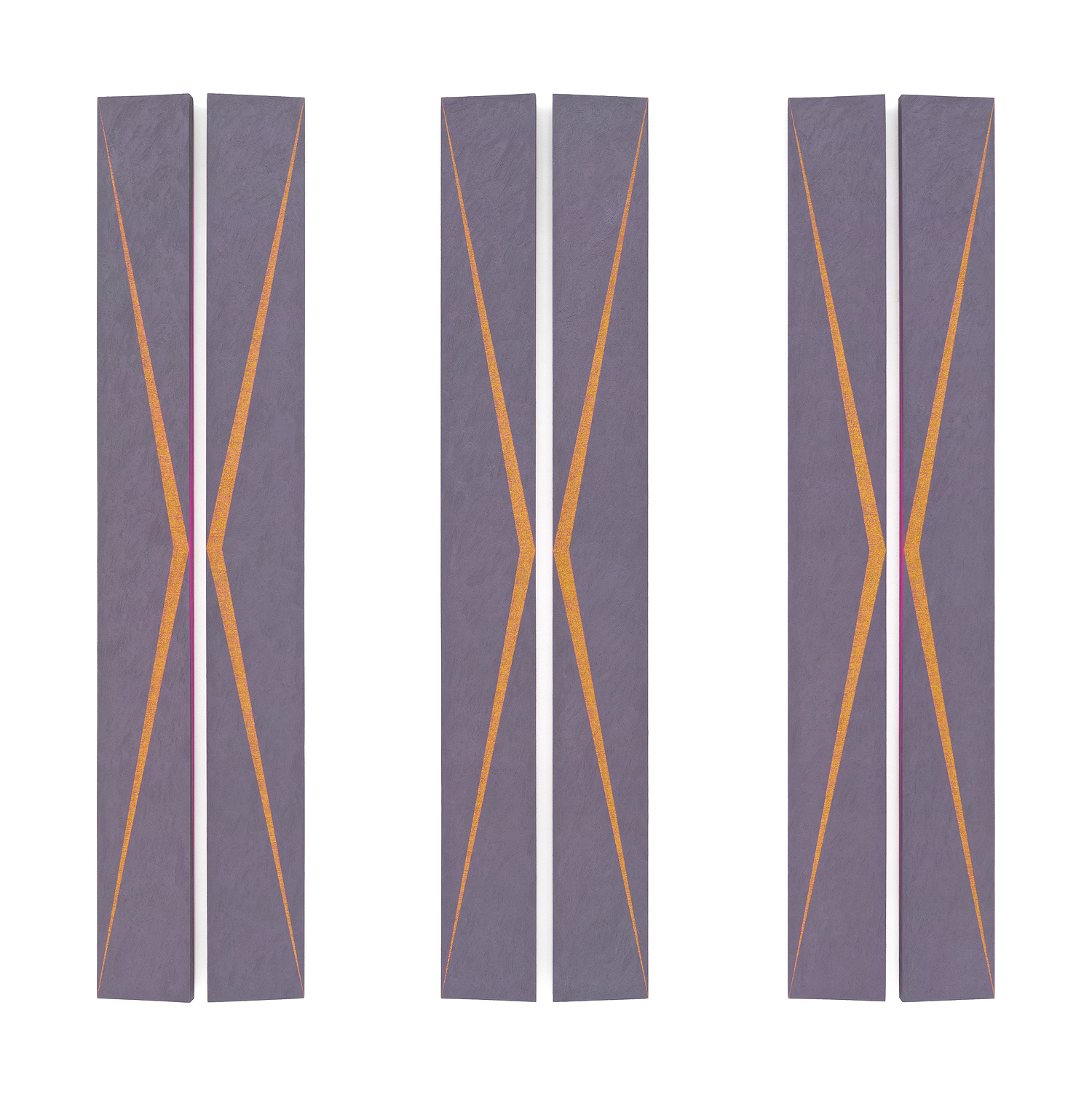
Irradianti, 1990

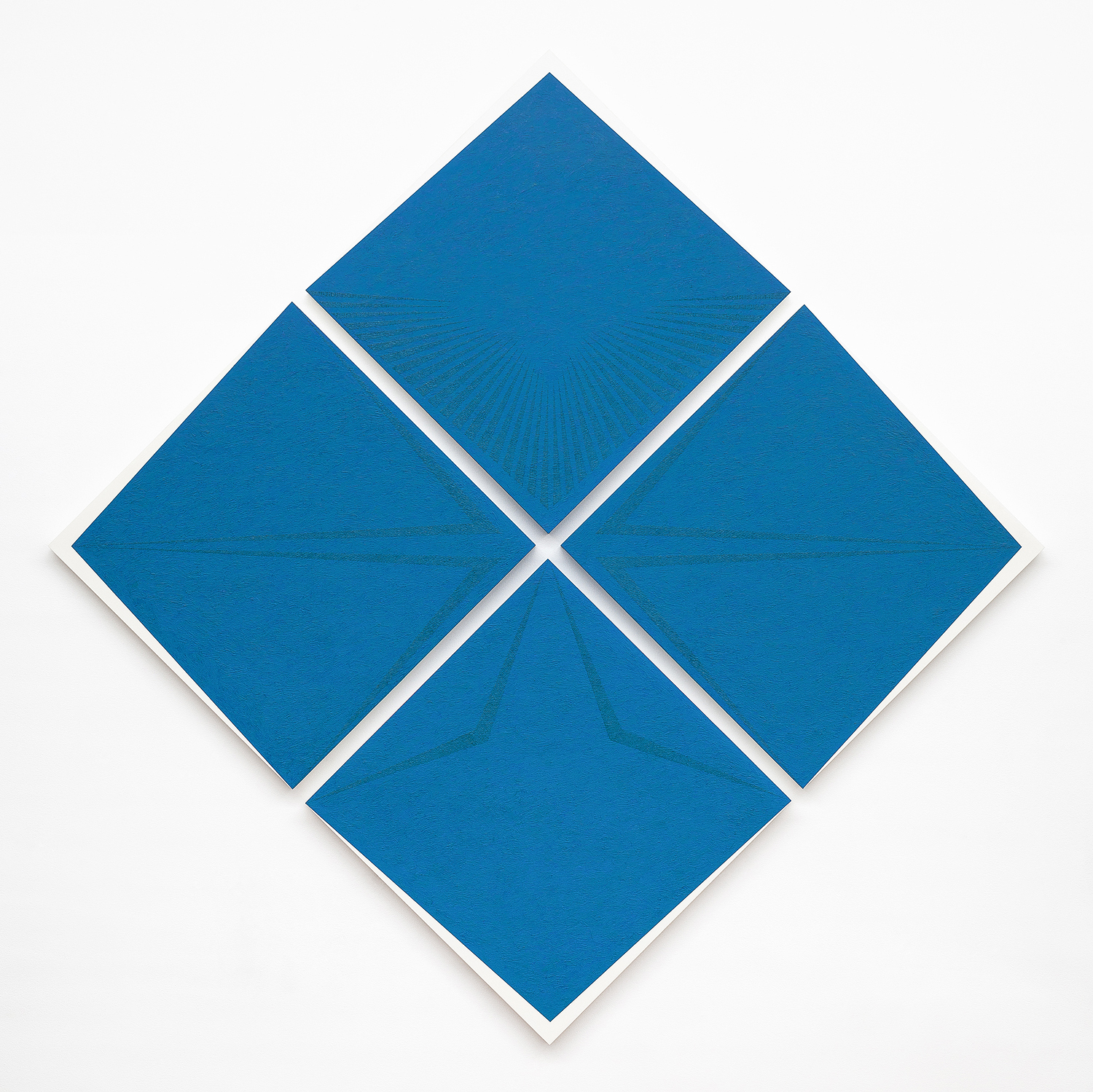
Virtuali, 1993

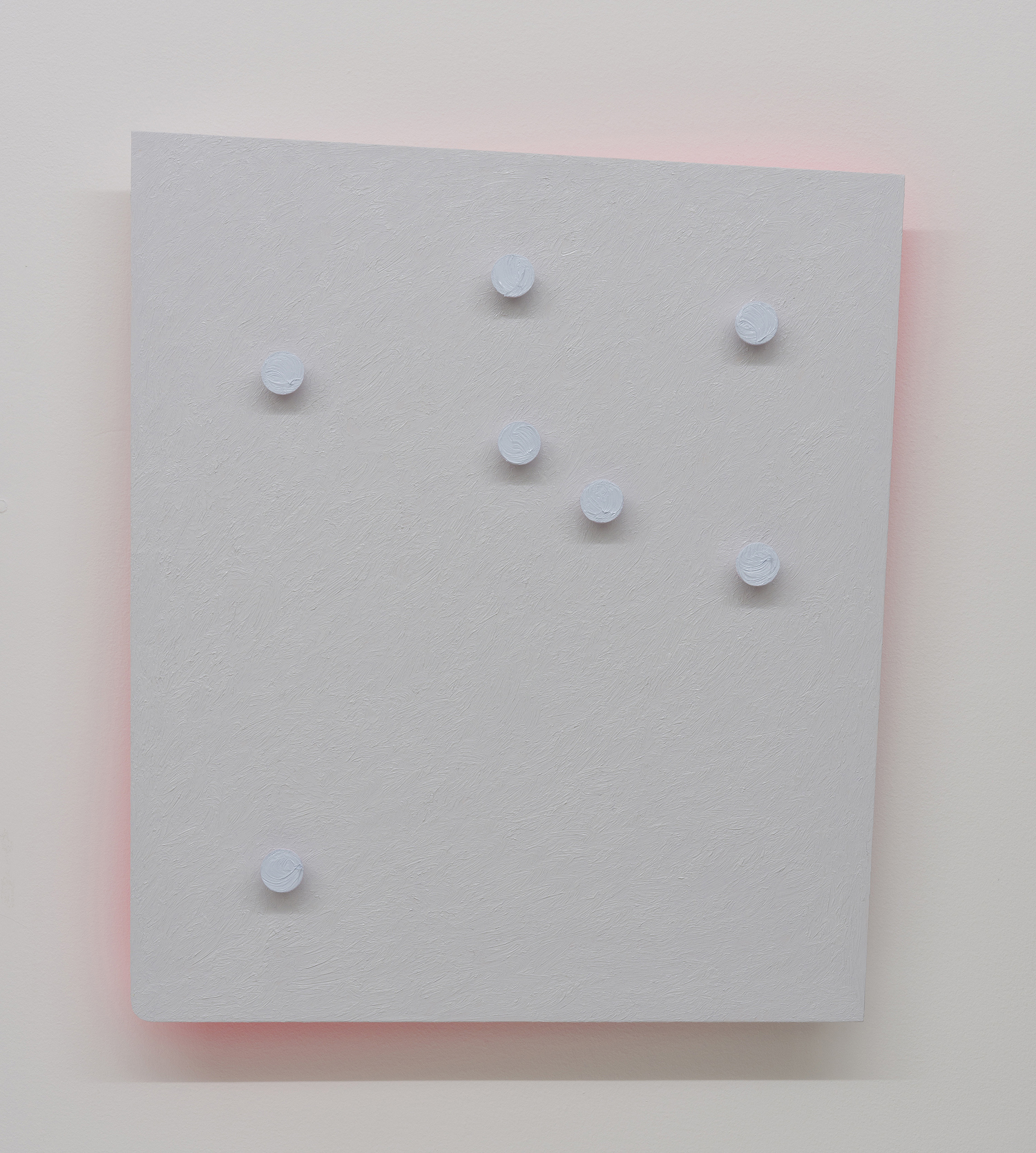
Sette punti celesti, 2015

== Bibliography ==
- Luciano Caramel e Enrico Crispolti, Gadaleta – Irradiazioni, Milano, Mazzotta, 1990
- Luciano Caramel e Enrico Mascelloni, Colore – Struttura. Una linea Italiana 1945/1990, Firenze, Giunti, 1990
- Manuela Crescentini et al., La Pittura in Italia – Il Novecento/2, Milano, Electa, 1993
- Gillo Dorfles, Ignazio Gadaleta, Virtualità della pittura, Santeramo (BA), Neos Arte Contemporanea, 1994
- Enrico Crispolti, La pittura in Italia – Il Novecento/3. Le ultime ricerche, Milano, Electa, 1994
- Danilo Eccher e Dede Auregli (a cura di), Arte italiana. Ultimi quarant'anni. Pittura aniconica, Milano, Skira, 1998
- Enrico Crispolti, Ignazio Gadaleta. Premio Scipione 2002, Cinisello Balsamo, Silvana Editoriale, 2002
- Ministero delle Infrastrutture e dei Trasporti – Dipartimento per le Opere Pubbliche e l'Edilizia (a cura di), Opere d'arte nelle Opere Pubbliche, Roma, Istituto Poligrafico e Zecca dello Stato, 2002
- Massimo Bignardi, La pittura contemporanea in italia meridionale 1945-1990, Napoli, Electa Napoli, 2003
- Eva Di Stefano, Il nuovo Palazzo di Giustizia di Palermo, Palermo, Sellerio, 2004
- Allgemeines Künstlerlexikon, Die Bildenden Künstler aller Zeiten und Völker, München – Leipzig, K.G. Saur, 2005
- Marcello Carriero, Oltre blu oltre. Le prospettive attuali della ricerca di Ignazio Gadaleta, in "La Diana", anni VIII-XI, Cinisello Balsamo, Silvana Editoriale, 2007
- Enrico Crispolti (a cura di), Inchiesta sull'arte, Milano, Electa, 2008
- Francesca Pola (a cura di), IGNAZIO GADALETA scritti di Enrico Crispolti, Venezia, Marsilio, 2015
- Francesco Tedeschi, Alberto Zanchetta (a cura di), GADALETA punti pittura + radianti, Roma, Gangemi Editore International, 2016
