= Dinosaur World (Creswick) =

Defunct theme park in Creswick, Victoria, Australia

- An advertisement for Dinosaur World, Creswick
- Interactive map of Dinosaur World
- Location: Creswick, Victoria, Australia
- Coordinates: 37°25′26″S 143°53′35″E
- Opened: 1982
- Closed: 2002
- Theme: Dinosaurs
- Attendance: 30,000

Dinosaur World (also known as World of Dinosaurs) was a theme park located 1.5km off the Midland Highway, outside Creswick, Victoria. Only 4 hectares (10 acres) large, it included around twenty life-size dinosaur models, a museum, playground and barbecue area.

Dinosaur Park was opened in 1982 by Stephanie and Bill Myers, who built the first fibreglass models himself. They later sold it to the local Plunkett family. The park was a success and described as a "Creswick tourism icon" by the Courier, attracting 30,000 annual visitors during the 1990s. However, it was sold in 2000 and closed by the new owner in 2002 because she could not afford the cost of liability insurance.

== Park ==
Dinosaur World was a 4-hectare (10-acre) theme park. It was situated on 7.3 hectares (18 acres) of natural bushland 1.5 km east off the Midland Highway, outside Creswick, Victoria. Dinosaur World initially charged $1.50 for adult admission and 60c for children. It included life-size dinosaur models, a museum, and playground and barbecue areas. The park was open daily from 9:30am–5:00pm, except on Christmas.

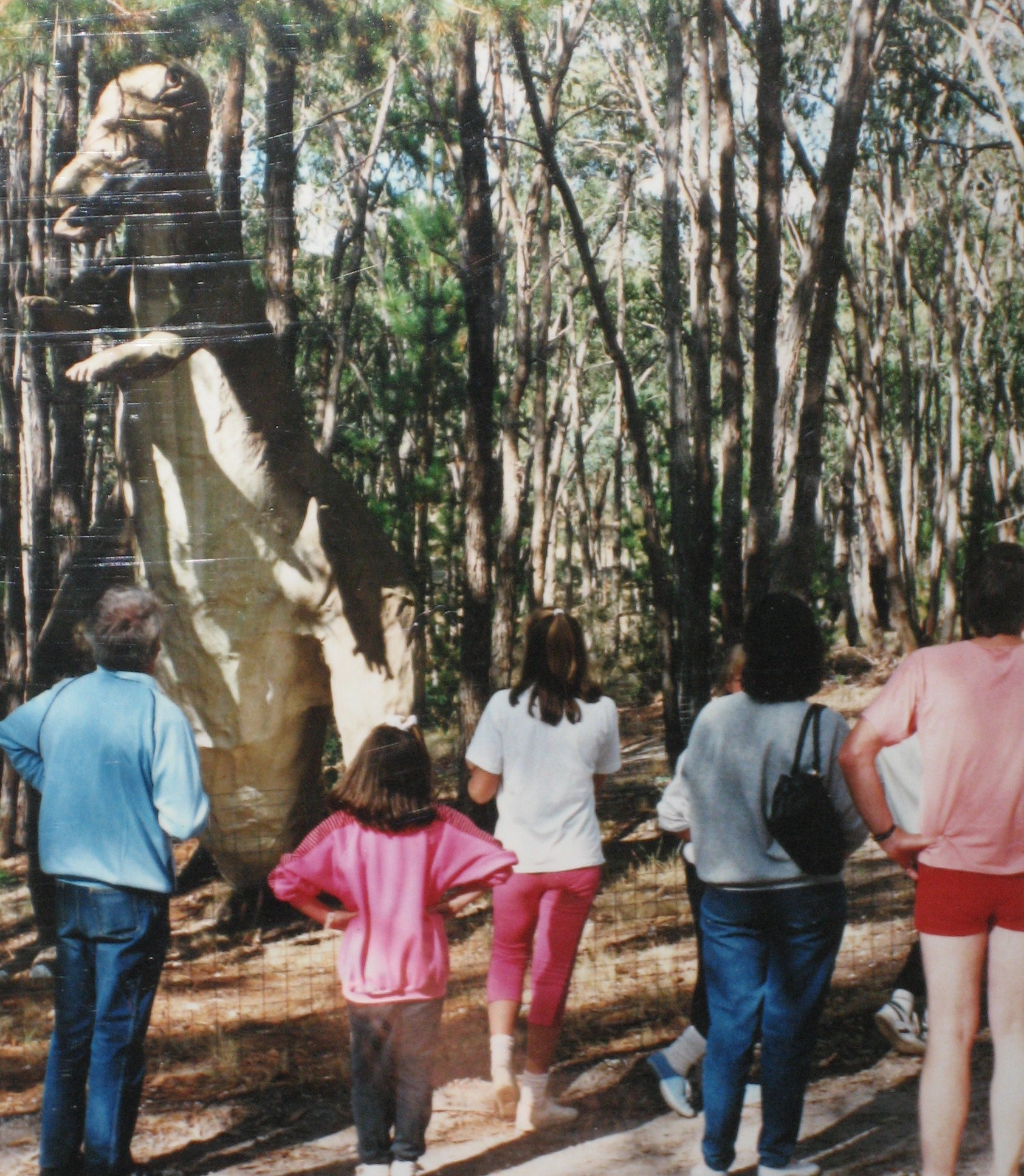
The Parasaurolophus model at Dinosaur Park in the early 1990s.

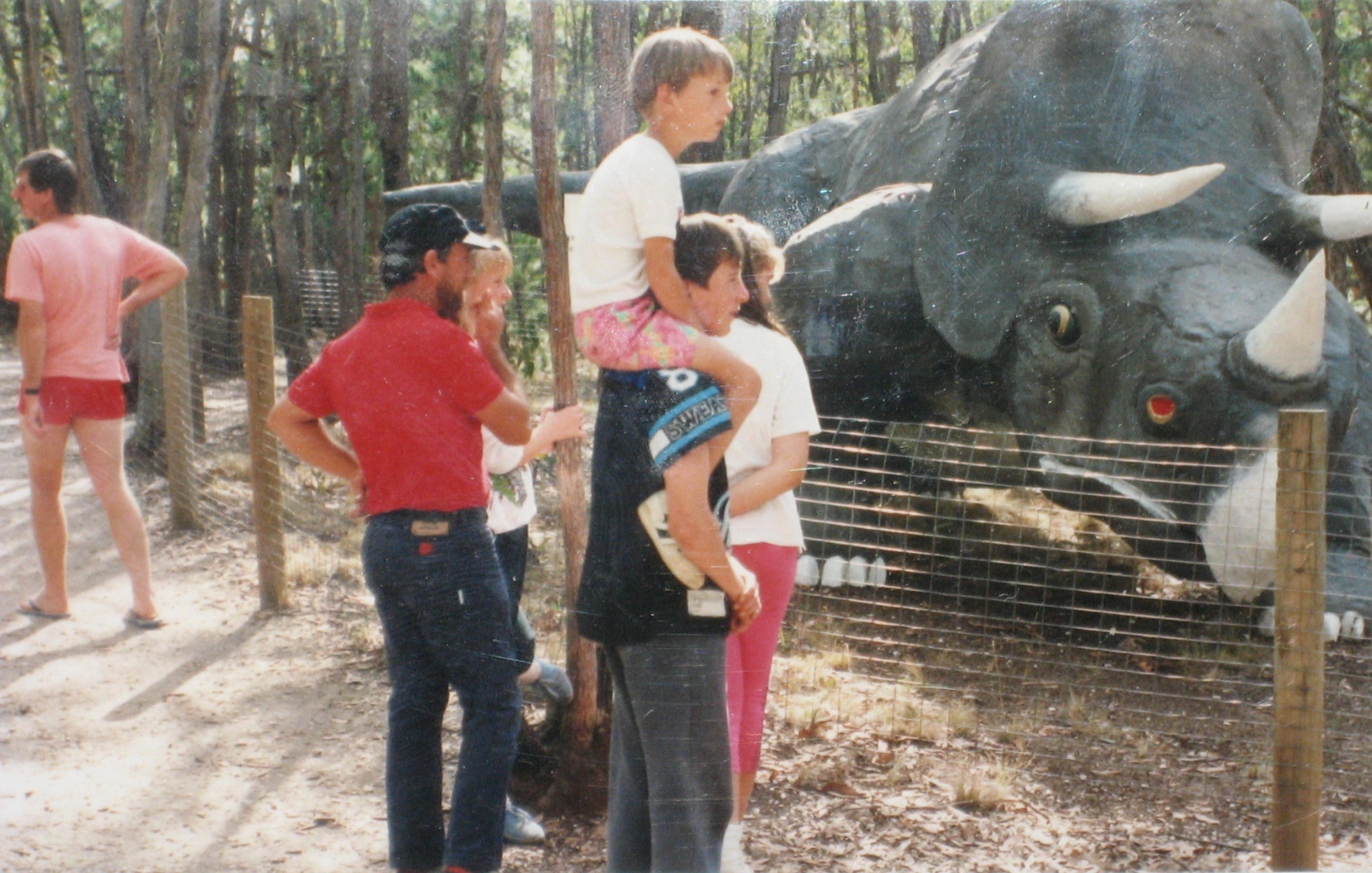
The Triceratops model at Dinosaur Park in the early 1990s.

== History ==
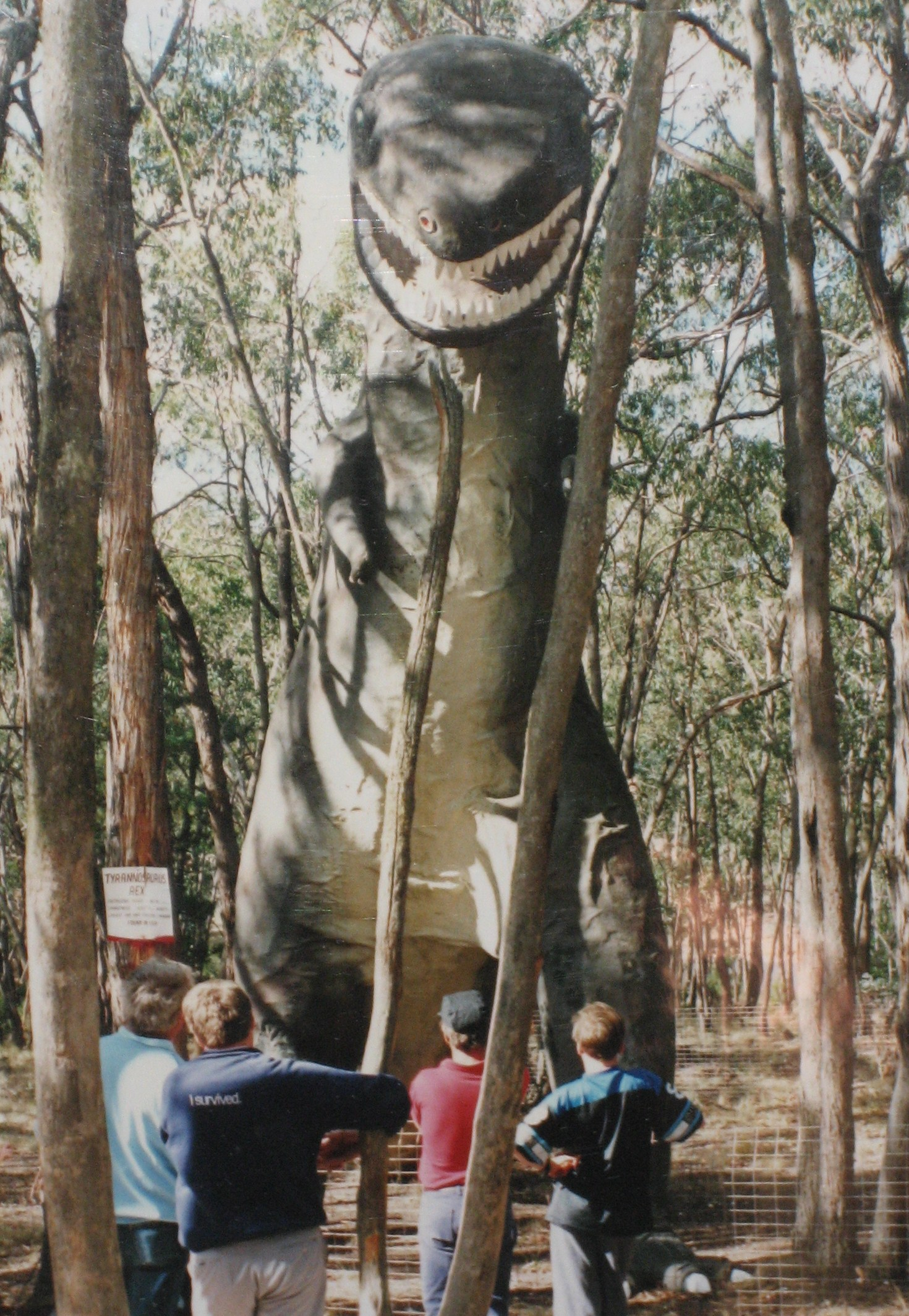
The tyrannosaurus model at Dinosaur Park with an "egg-shaped" head in the early 1990s.

Dinosaur World was opened by Bill Myers and his wife Stephanie in 1982. They immigrated to Australia with their three sons in the mid-1950s, where Myers worked in textiles. He was inspired by a dinosaur theme park in Queensland and, despite many rejections for bank loans and scepticism from his wife, began building fibreglass dinosaur models in his garage. Their house was situated above the kiosk.

Dinosaur World was a successful tourist attraction for Creswick, as visiting Gold Coast theme parks was not feasible for many families. After the Myers retired in the late 1980s, they sold it to the local Plunkett family who also worked in the tourism industry. The Plunketts began manufacturing new dinosaurs—the largest of which was a 70 ft (21 m) long brontosaurus—and there were 25 dinosaurs by the late 1990s. Public imagination of the tyrannosaurus shifted after the first two Jurassic Park films; a second head was created for promotional purposes as the first was too "egg-shaped". Dinosaur World received over 30,000 visitors annually during the 1990s. However, the Plunketts sold the park in 2000 because of how much time operating it took up. Creswick then had few other family attractions, and Dinosaur World drew many people to the area; the Courier called it a "Creswick tourism icon". It was recommended to families by the Age and the Herald Sun.

In June 2002, new owner Keah Otto closed Dinosaur World. She said there were many reasons for the closure, mainly that she could not afford the cost of liability insurance and WorkCover. She also said that it was "terribly run down" when she bought it. Only a shed and the tyrannosaurus model remain at the original site.
