= Maple Grove Park Cemetery (Hackensack, New Jersey) =

Cemetery in New Jersey, US

Coordinates: 40°51′37″N 74°02′19″W

Maple Grove Park Cemetery is located in Hackensack, New Jersey. It is operated by the Maple Grove Park Cemetery Association, at 535 Hudson Street in Hackensack. In 2004–2005 it received the remains of bodies removed from the Hudson County Burial Grounds in Secaucus, New Jersey. The plaque for the Hudson County arrivals reads: "In 2003, the remains of 4,569 of these individuals were removed from the Potter’s Field and brought to this spot to be honored and remembered. May this site serve in perpetuity as their final resting place and a sanctuary of peace."

== Notable burials ==
- Al Goodman (1946–2010), Soul Singer
- John Huyler (1808–1870), represented New Jersey's 4th congressional district in the United States House of Representatives from 1857–1859.
- Leonardo Andriani (1895-1948), Italian immigrant

== See also ==
- Bergen County cemeteries
