= Field Station: Dinosaurs =

Outdoor theme park

New Jersey park
- Location: 40 Fort Lee Road; Leonia, New Jersey 07605
- Opened: 2012
- Closed: November 9th, 2025
- Operating season: May through November
- Area: 30 acres (12 ha)
- Website: jerseydinos.com

Kansas park
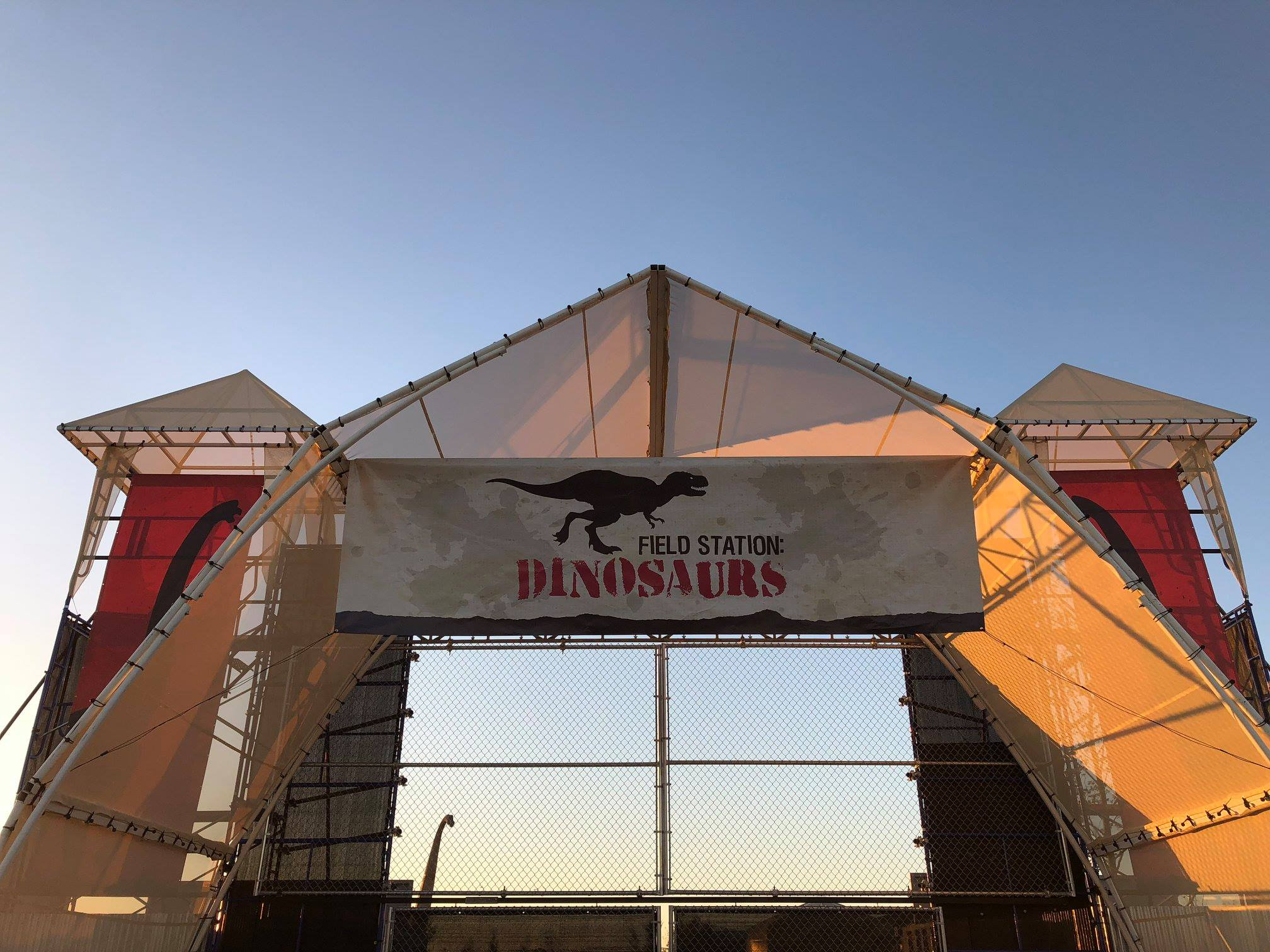
- Field Station: Dinosaurs in Kansas
- Location: 2999 North Rock Road; Derby, Kansas 67036
- Opened: 2018
- Operating season: May through November
- Area: 14 acres (5.7 ha)
- Website: kansasdinos.com

Field Station: Dinosaurs is an outdoor prehistoric theme park with one location in the United States. The park is designed for families with children between the ages of three and eleven and features a walking tour with life-sized animatronic dinosaurs as well as interactive exhibits and live shows designed to educate children about dinosaurs. Guy Gsell is credited as the creator and founder of the Field Station: Dinosaurs brand.

The first location opened in New Jersey in 2012, and was named Best Local Theme Park the same year by Time Out New York. Fodor's named Field Station: Dinosaurs one of the World's Best Spots for Dinosaur Lovers on March 6, 2014.

In 2018, a second location opened in Derby, Kansas (Wichita metro area). The New Jersey park closed permanently at the end of the operating season on November 9, 2025, leaving the Kansas location the only one in operation.

== New Jersey location ==
The first Field Station: Dinosaurs location opened on May 26, 2012, at Snake Hill in Secaucus, New Jersey. After four seasons, Field Station: Dinosaurs lost its lease on the property to make room for a new campus of the Hudson County Schools of Technology. The Secaucus park closed on September 7, 2015. Possible locations included Derby, Kansas and West Milford, New Jersey. In 2016, Field Station: Dinosaurs opened in its new location in Bergen County's Overpeck County Park alongside Teaneck Creek.

The New Jersey location closed in November 2025, and its entire collection of dinosaur sculptures and animatronics was put up for sale.

=== Attractions ===
The New Jersey location featured several visitor areas with dinosaur-themed attractions.

The Base Camp area served as the entry point to the park, where visitors would receive their "credentials": a passport stamped as they participated in games, workshops, and shows throughout the park. Base Camp was also home to a gift shop and first aid station.

The Amphitheater was an open-air performance space which featured multiple shows per day featuring dinosaur puppets. These shows included "Feeding Frenzy", which covered dinosaur diets; and "Found in New Jersey", a fossil show dedicating to showcasing dinosaurs found in New Jersey. Additional shows presented in the amphitheater included Field Station Challenge, Morning Briefing, Songs o' the Dinosaur Troubadour, and the Dinosaur Dance Party.

In the Riverview area, visitors could see various animatronic dinosaurs, including a Hadrosaurus, Tyrannosaurus, and a 90-foot-long Argentinosaurus, the largest animatronic dinosaur in the world at the time. The Argentinosaurus animatronic was destroyed in a fire in 2016.

== Kansas location ==
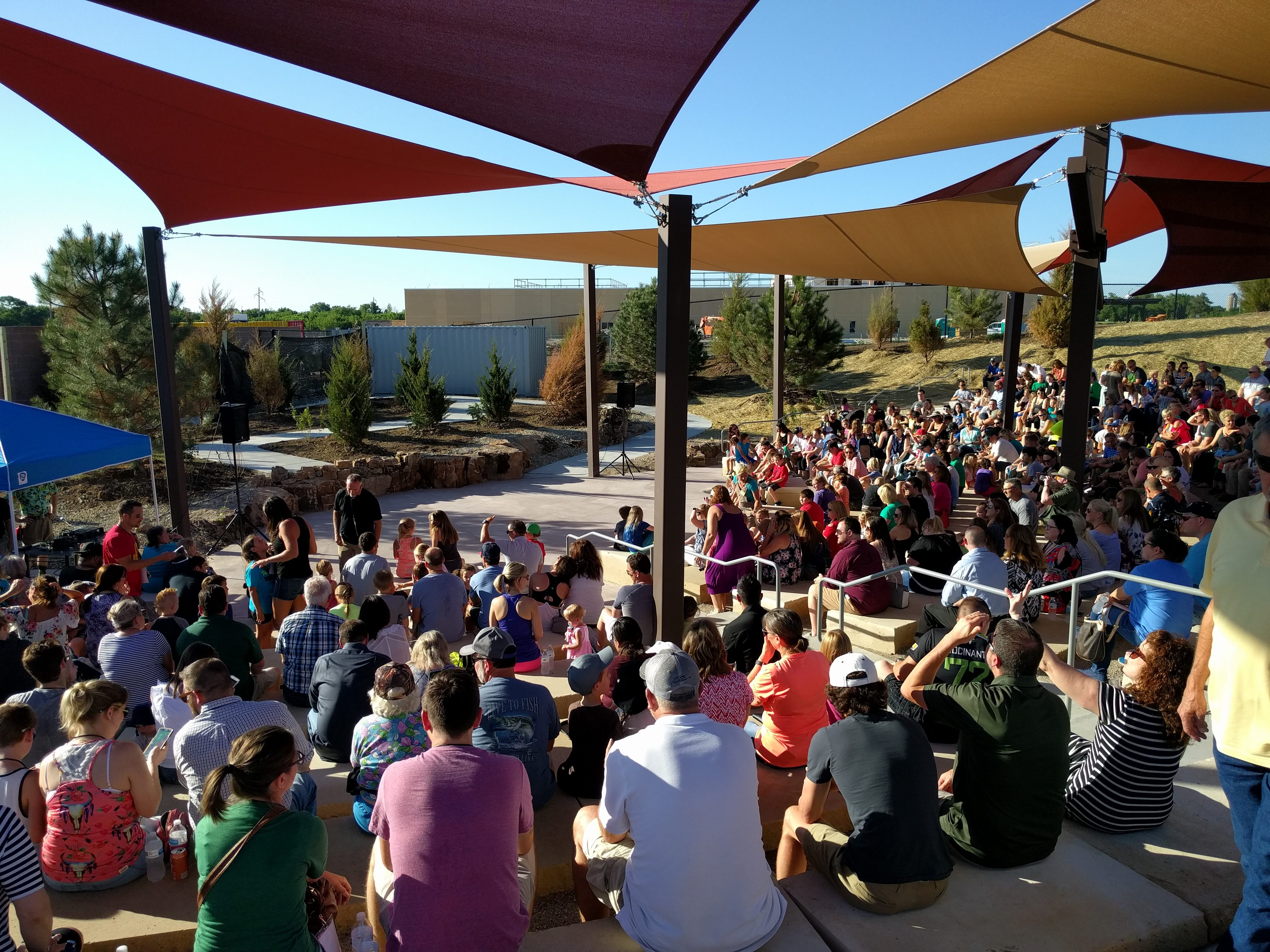
A large crowd in the amphitheater in Derby

Field Station: Dinosaurs opened its second location in Derby, Kansas on May 26, 2018, featuring 44 animatronic dinosaurs and more than 40 live shows per day.

== List of species featured ==
Reproductions of the following dinosaurs and Mesozoic-aged reptiles have been featured in the parks:

- Ankylosaurus
- Apatosaurus
- Appalachiosaurus
- Argentinosaurus
- Baryonyx
- Brachiosaurus
- Claosaurus
- Compsognathus
- Daspletosaurus
- Deinosuchus
- Dilophosaurus
- Dimetrodon
- Dracorex hogwartsia
- Dryptosaurus
- Edmontosaurus
- Hadrosaurus
- Hypsibema missouriensis
- Niobrarasaurus coleii
- Nyctosaurus
- Oryctodromeus
- Pachycephalosaurus
- Parasaurolophus
- Pteranodon
- Quetzalcoatlus
- Saurophaganax
- Spinosaurus
- Stegosaurus
- Tyrannosaurus
- Triceratops
- Tylosaurus
- Utahraptor
- Velociraptor
