= Leonardo Andriani =

Italian longshoreman (1895–1948)

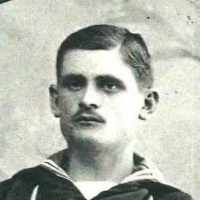
- Andriani, c. 1913
- Born: January 25, 1895; Molfetta, Apulia, Italy
- Died: December 24, 1948 (aged 53); Secaucus, New Jersey, U.S.
- Burial place: Maple Grove Park Cemetery
- Occupation: Longshoreman
- Spouse: Marianna DeBari (m. 1925)
- Children: Gennaro Andriani; Serafina Andriani
- Parents: Gennaro Andriani; Serafina Ciccolella

Leonardo Andriani; January 25, 1895 – December 24, 1948) was an Italian longshoreman and immigrant born in Molfetta, Italy. The search for his remains led to one of the largest disinterments in United States history.

== Biography ==
Raised as the son of an impoverished waggoner in southern Italy, he joined the Italian Navy in World War I, before settling down and meeting a wife of his own; Marianna DeBari. They had two children, Gennaro and Serafina, but work was grueling in the olive fields of Apulia, so he decided to make his fortune in America. He is first recorded to have traveled to Hoboken, New Jersey as early as 1920, like so many others from Molfetta did. He would return home only twice and send money back often to his wife and children.

On December 21, 1948, he was found wandering on the streets of Hoboken, New Jersey, seemingly confused and disoriented. The police picked him up and, after spending a night in a Hoboken City Hall holding cell, he was committed to the Hudson County Lunatic Asylum where he died after just three days in their care. The alleged cause of his commitment was due to arterio-sclerotic psychosis. His grandson, Patrick Andriani, is most well known for his search for his remains, as detailed in the documentary "Snake Hill" in 2007.
