= Dinosaur World (theme parks) =

Chain of theme parks

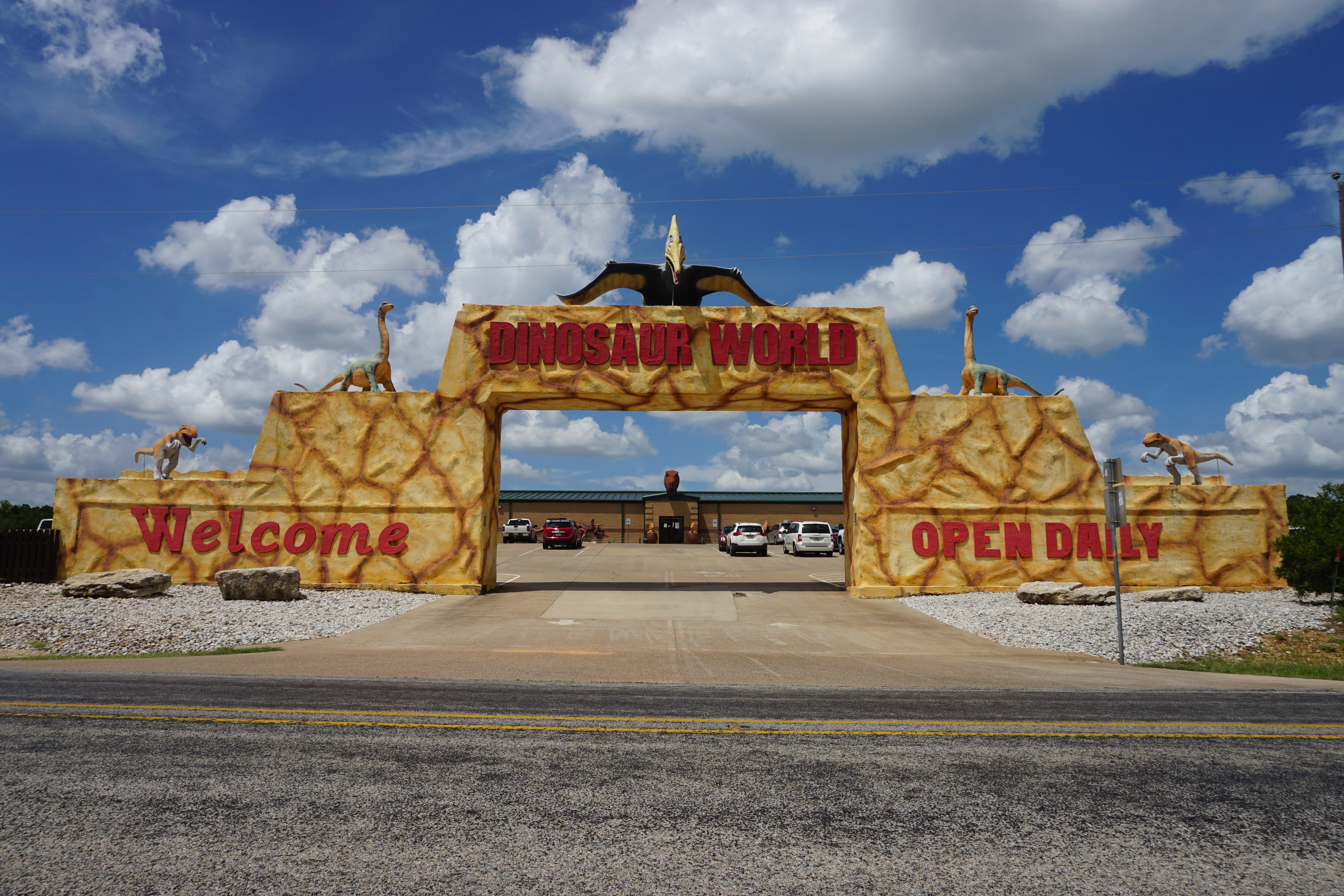
- Dinosaur World in Glen Rose, Texas
- Interactive map of Dinosaur World
- Location: Plant City, Florida, Cave City, Kentucky, Glen Rose, Texas
- Coordinates: 28.02873°N 82.18949°W
- Opened: November 1998
- Owner: Christer Svensson
- General manager: Marlene Svensson
- Slogan: Over 150 life-size dinosaurs
- Website: dinosaurworld.com

Dinosaur World is a chain of outdoor dinosaur theme parks in the US. Their locations include Plant City, Florida; Glen Rose, Texas; and Cave City, Kentucky. The parks feature over 150 life-size dinosaur sculptures created by Christer Svensson. The Florida location opened in November 1998, the Kentucky location five years after, and Texas location followed five years after that.

== Park Operations ==
In each park, life-size dinosaur statues are placed among native vegetation or water features to simulate animals in a wild environment. Plant species that date from the time of the dinosaurs can be found on the grounds and identified with small signs. At a "Fossil Dig", kids can dig at a sand table for real fossils. A "Dino gem" excavation activity is also offered.

=== Sculptures ===
The dinosaur sculptures themselves are made from a base of carved polystyrene foam, covered with fiberglass, then putty which is textured as the skin and painted. Each dinosaur is made on location at the park; about three new dinosaur replicas are added each year.

The Plant City park has nearly 200 sculptures on display.

== See also ==
- List of dinosaur parks
