= The Dinosaur Place =

Dinosaur-themed family adventure park

- Previously known as Dinosaur Crossing
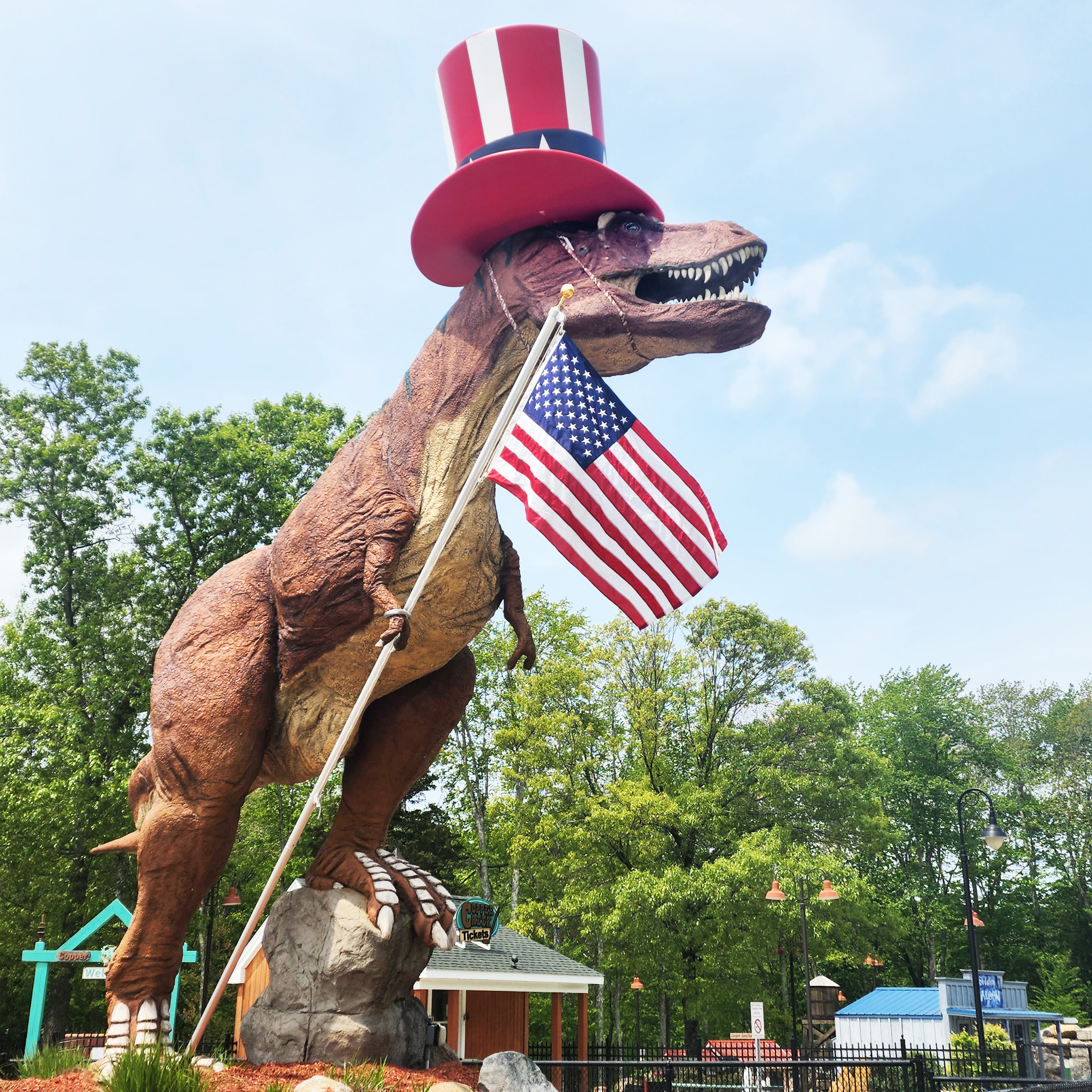
- Monty T. Rex, a 14-feet tall T-Rex mascot of The Dinosaur Place, on Route 85 in Montville, Connecticut.
- Interactive map of The Dinosaur Place
- Location: Montville, Connecticut, United States
- Coordinates: 41.4326°N 72.2226°W
- Status: Operating
- Opened: 2001
- Theme: Dinosaur
- Area: 60 acres (24 ha)
- Website: Official website

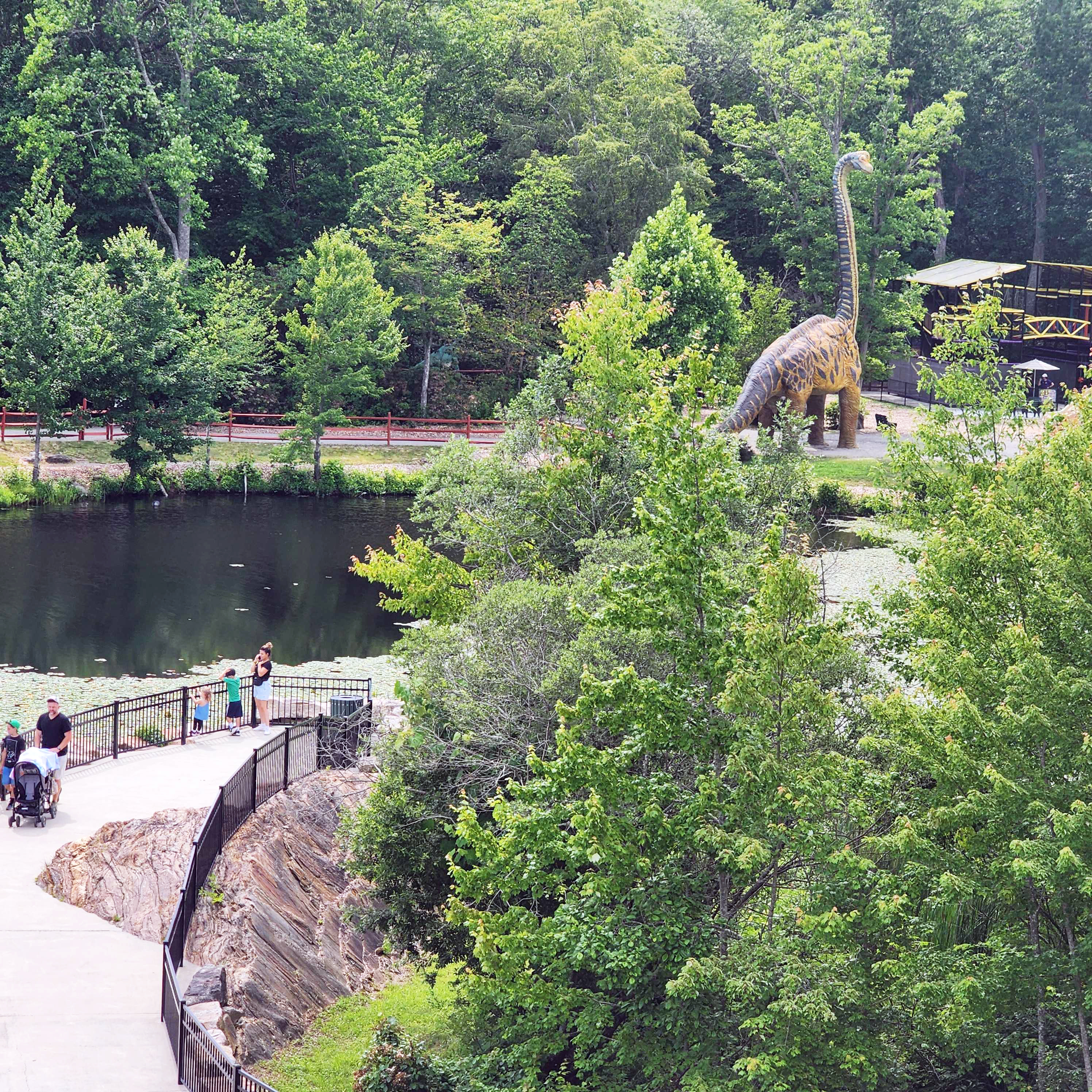
Life-sized Brachiosaurus at The Dinosaur Place in Montville, CT

The Dinosaur Place is a family-owned 60-acre dinosaur-themed adventure park located in Nature's Art Village in Montville, Connecticut. The park features 60 life-sized dinosaurs on 1.5 miles of trails, playgrounds, a custom-made play zone "T-Rex Tower", splash pad, a maze and several additional attractions.

== History ==
The Dinosaur Place opened in 1991 as Nature’s Art, a gift shop selling fossils, minerals, and jewellery in Salem, Connecticut. In 2001, the owners Linda and Roger Phillips purchased the Montville property and began the construction of the dinosaur-themed park that initially was called Dinosaur Crossing. Eventually, Nature’s Art Village expanded to 24,000 square feet and opened the gallery of crystals and authentic fossils next to The Dinosaur Place.

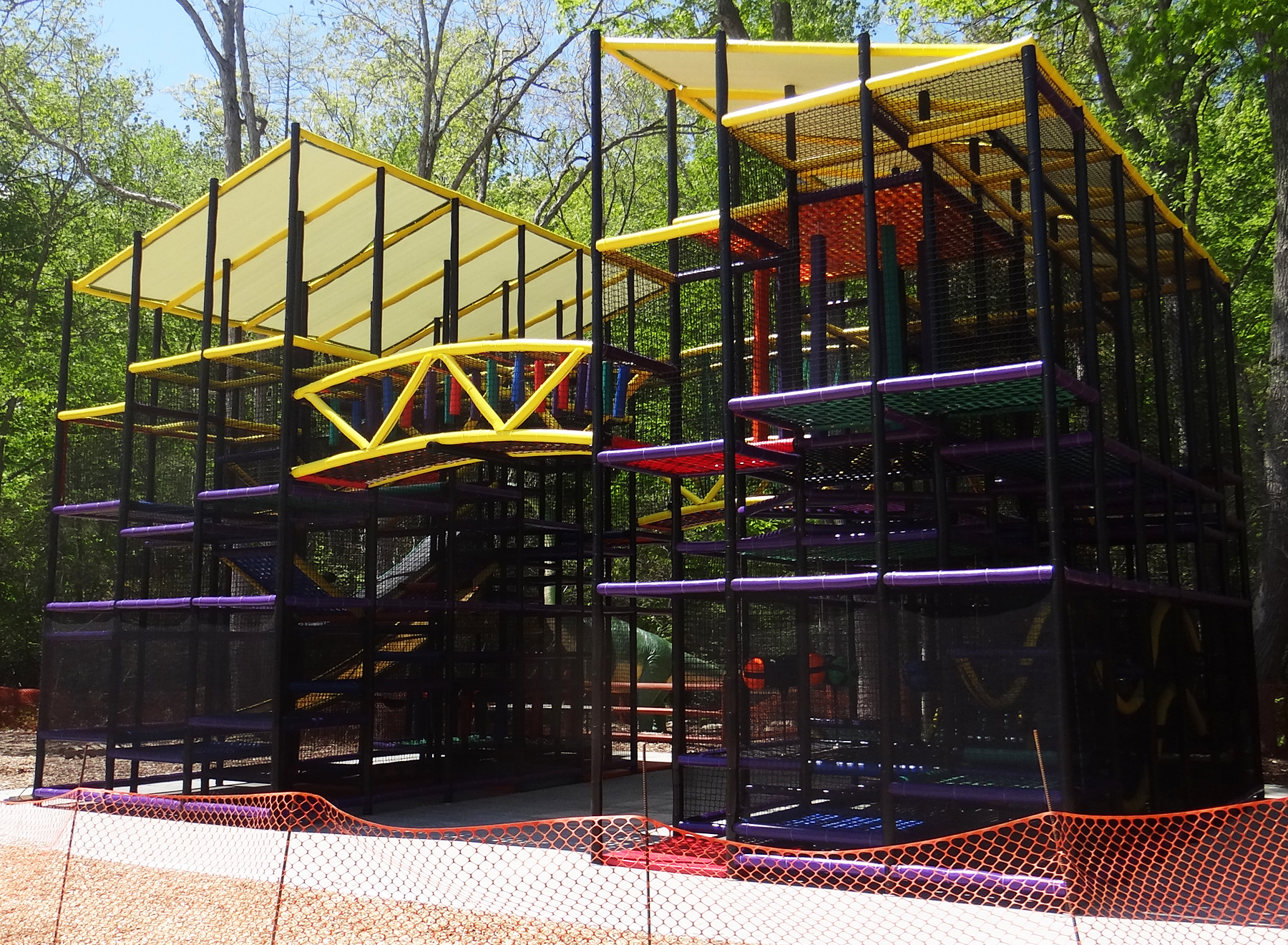
T-Rex Tower, two-story custom-made playscape.

== Features ==
- 60+ life-sized dinosaurs on 1.5 miles of trails
- Animatronic dinosaurs exhibit
- Splash Pad, a zero-depth water playground
- T-Rex Tower, a two-story custom-made playscape
- A volcano replica
- A-MAZE-asaurus, a maze with a slide through the mouth of a Tyrannosaurus Rex
- Lapilli Landing, which includes mini golf, pedal go karts, and train rides.

== Events ==
The Dinosaur Place runs multiple events throughout the year, including Easter Dino Egg Hunt, the Earth Week, and a Halloween event in October called Pumpkin Passage.
