= Cuenca, Spain =

Cuenca
- Municipality
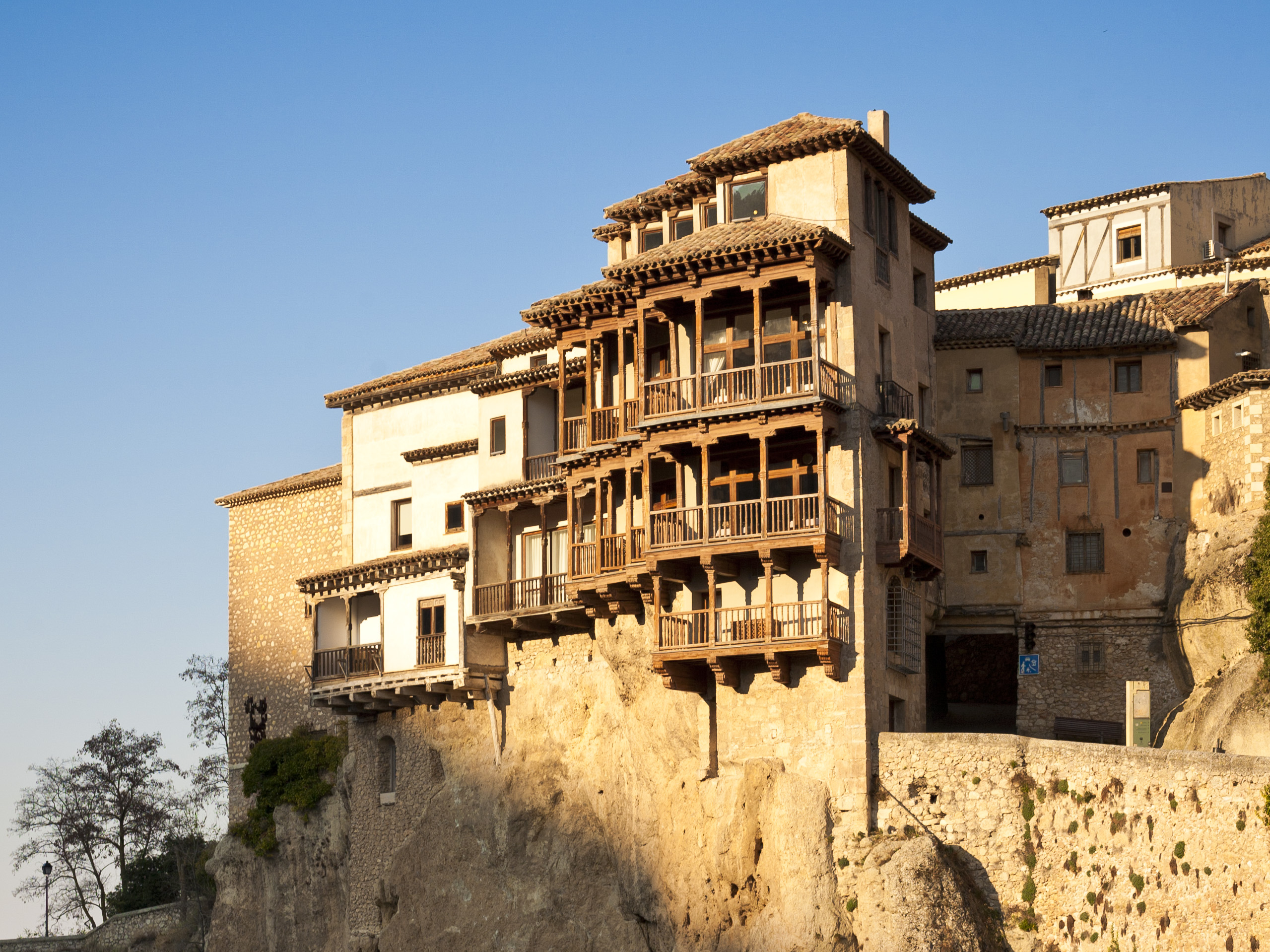
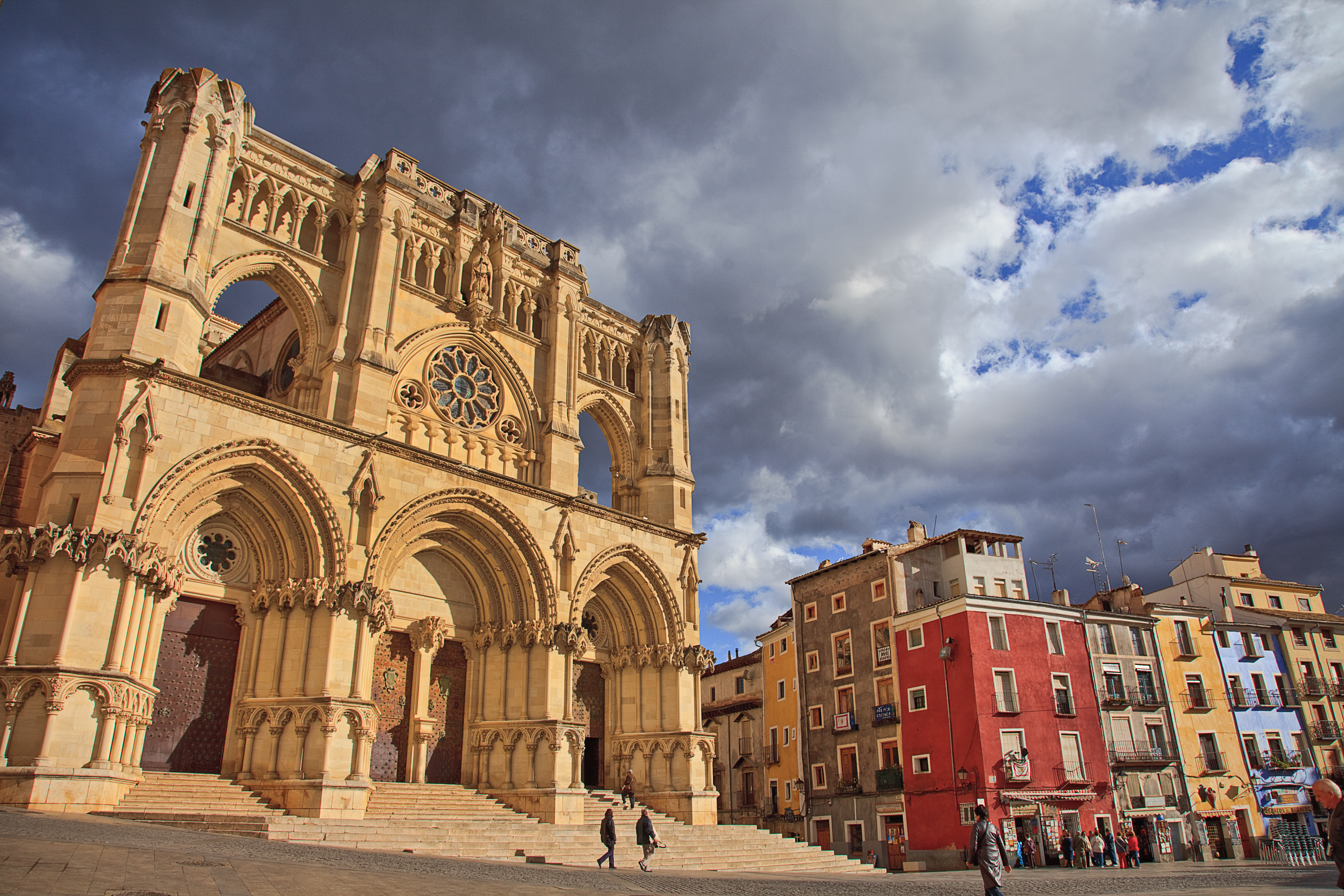
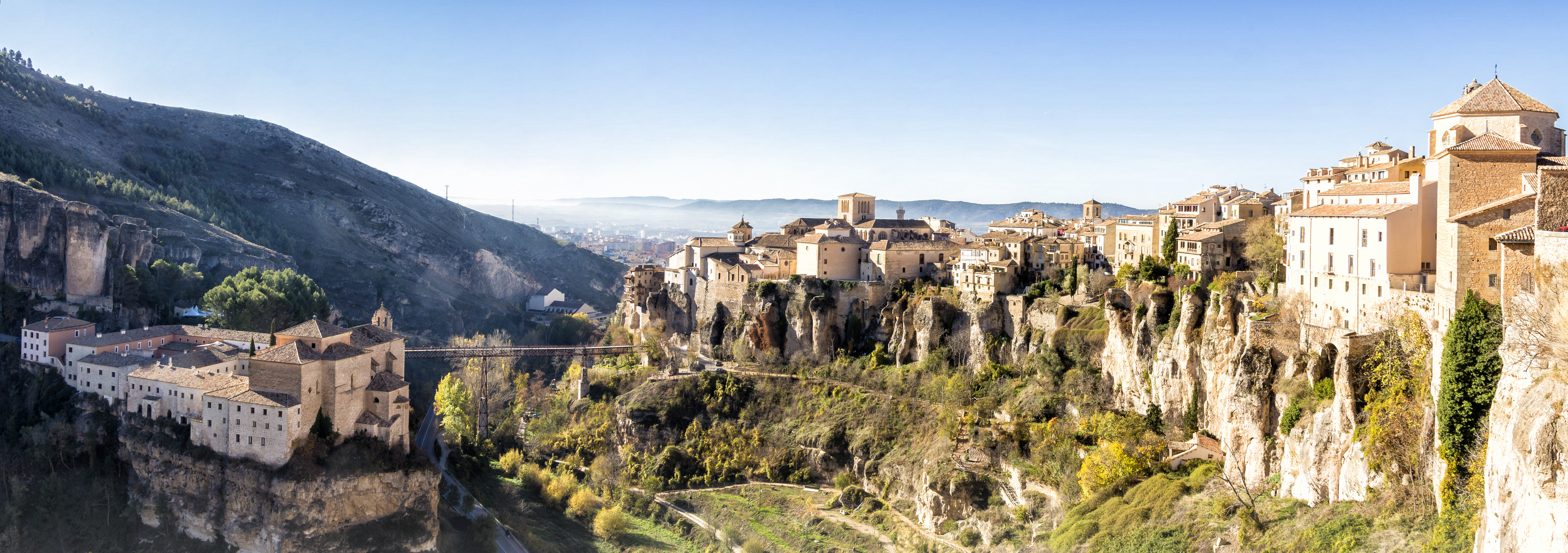
- Hanging Houses Cathedral Panoramic view

- Flag Coat of arms
- Nickname: Cent
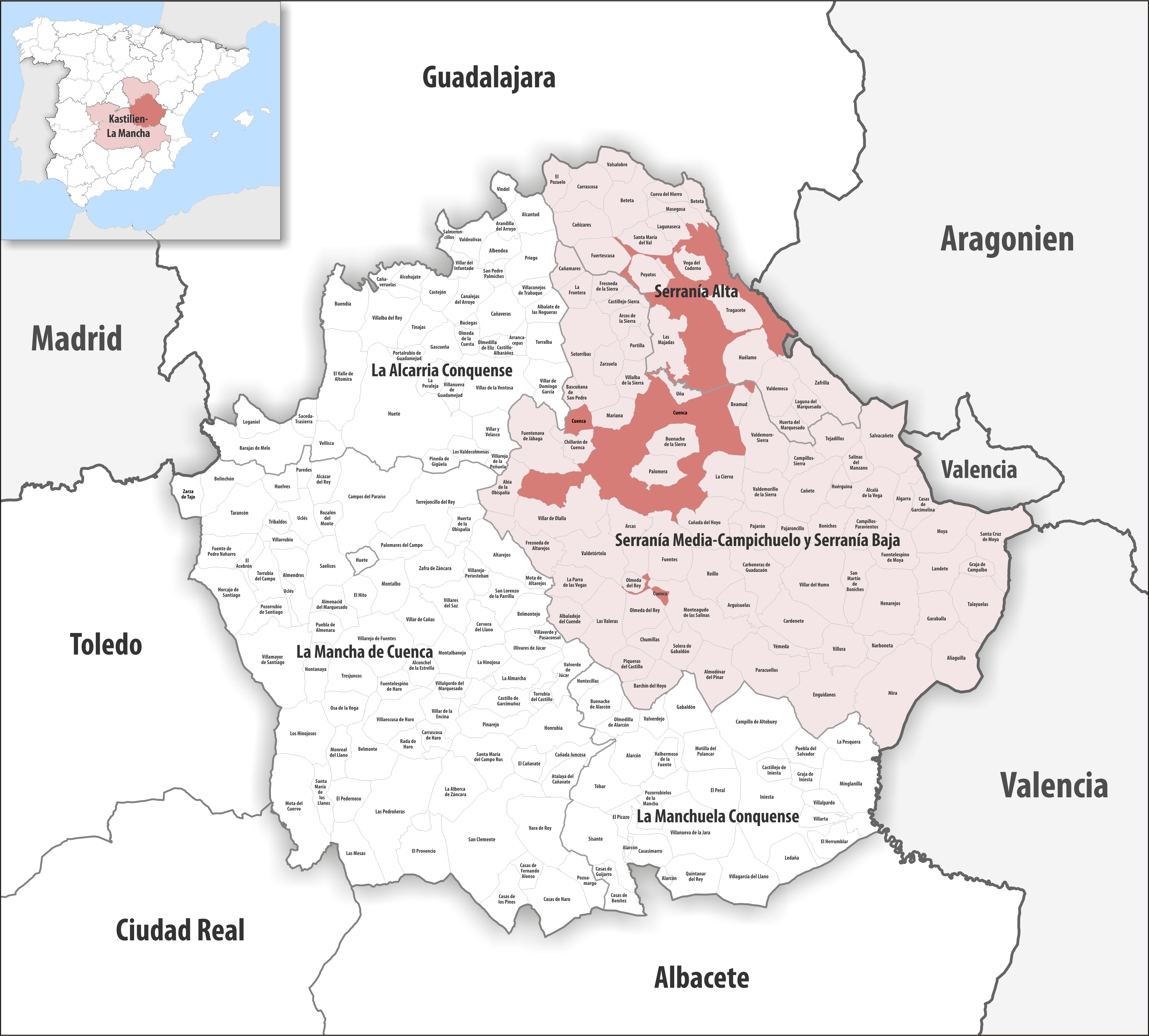
- Location of Cuenca
- Interactive map of Cuenca
- Coordinates: 40°4′18″N 2°8′4″W
- Country: Spain
- Autonomous community: Castile–La Mancha
- Province: Cuenca
- Comarca: Serranía Media

Government
  - Mayor (2011): Darío Dolz (PSOE)

Area
  - Total: 911.06 km^{2} (351.76 sq mi)
- Elevation: 946 m (3,104 ft)

Population (2025-01-01)
  - Total: 53,600
  - Density: 58.8/km^{2} (152/sq mi)
- Demonym: Conquense
- Time zone: UTC+1 (CET)
  - Summer (DST): UTC+2 (CEST)
- Postal code: 16000
- Website: Official website

UNESCO World Heritage Site
- Official name: Historic Walled Town of Cuenca
- Criteria: Cultural: ii, v
- Reference: 781
- Inscription: 1996 (20th Session)

Cuenca (Spanish: [ˈkweŋka]) is a city and municipality of Spain located in the autonomous community of Castilla–La Mancha and the capital of the province of Cuenca.

The primitive urban core developed on a narrow escarpment caged between the Júcar and the Huécar rivers, on the western fringes of the Iberian System mountains. It was probably founded towards the 10th century AD, becoming a stronghold of the Arabised Berber lineage of the Banū Zennum, featuring a fortress, Qal'at Kūnka, which was conquered for the Kingdom of Castile in 1177. In the early modern period, the city boasted of a thriving textile and tapestry industry.

== Etymology ==
Its name may derive from the Latin conca meaning "river basin", referring to the gorge of the rivers Júcar and Huécar. It may also be derived from the now-ruined Arab castle, Kunka. Other alternative original names have been suggested, including "Anitorgis", "Sucro" or "Concava". The city of Cuenca is also known as the "Eagle's Nest" because of its precarious position on the edge of a gorge.

The city was known in Arabic as قونكة (Qūnkah).

== History ==
When the Iberian peninsula was part of the Roman Empire, there were several important settlements in the province, such as Segobriga, Ercavica and Gran Valeria. However, the place where Cuenca is located today was uninhabited at that time.

When the Muslims captured the area in 714, they soon realized the value of this strategic location and they built a fortress (called Kunka) between two gorges dug between the Júcar and Huécar rivers, surrounded by a 1 km-long wall. Cuenca's economy soon became dominated by agriculture and textile manufacturing, enjoying growing prosperity.

In the early 11th century, the Caliphate of Córdoba broke into several rump states (taifas). Cuenca was ruled by the taifa of Toledo—possibly the largest one—whose jurisdiction roughly spanned across the bulk of the Middle March of Al-Andalus. In 1076, Cuenca was besieged by Sancho Ramírez of Aragon, who failed to conquer the place. In 1080 King Yahya al-Qadir of Toledo lost his taifa, and his vizier signed in Cuenca a treaty with Alfonso VI of León and Castile by which he ceded him some fortresses in exchange for military help.

Following the Christian defeat at the battle of Sagrajas (1086), Cuenca was captured by the taifa king of Seville, Al-Mu'tamid ibn Abbad. However, when his lands were attacked by the Almoravids, he sent his daughter-in-law Zaida to Alfonso, offering him Cuenca in exchange for military support. The first Christian troops entered the city in 1093.

However, the Almoravids captured it in 1108. Their governor in Cuenca declared independence in 1144, followed by the whole of Murcia the following year. In 1147 Muhammad ibn Mardanis became King of Cuenca, Murcia and Valencia. He defended his lands from the Almohad invasion until his death in 1172, after which his son had to sign a pact of tributes with the newcomers. A 17-year-old Alfonso VIII of Castile tried to conquer the place, but after five months of siege, he had to retreat after the arrival of troops sent by the Almohad caliph Abu Yaqub Yusuf. Alfonso signed a seven-year truce but when, in 1176 the Cuenca locals occupied some Christian lands in Huete and Uclés, Alfonso intervened at the head of a coalition including also Ferdinand II of León, Alfonso II of Aragon and the Military Orders of Calatrava, Santiago and Montegaudio, besieging Cuenca for months starting from 1177's Epiphany. The Cuenca's commander, Abu Bakr, again sought the support of Yaqub Yusuf, but the latter was in Africa and did not send any help. After an unsuccessful sortie against the Christian besiegers' camp on 27 July, Cuenca was conquered by Alfonso's troops on 21 September 1177, while the Muslim garrison took refuge in the citadel. The latter fell in October, putting an end to Arab domination.

Cuenca was given a set of laws, the Fuero, written in Latin, that ruled Cuenca's citizens, and it was considered one of the most perfectly written at that time. The Diocese of Cuenca was established in 1183; its second bishop was St. Julian of Cuenca, who became patron saint of the city.

Alfonso X granted Cuenca the title of 'city' (ciudad) in 1257.

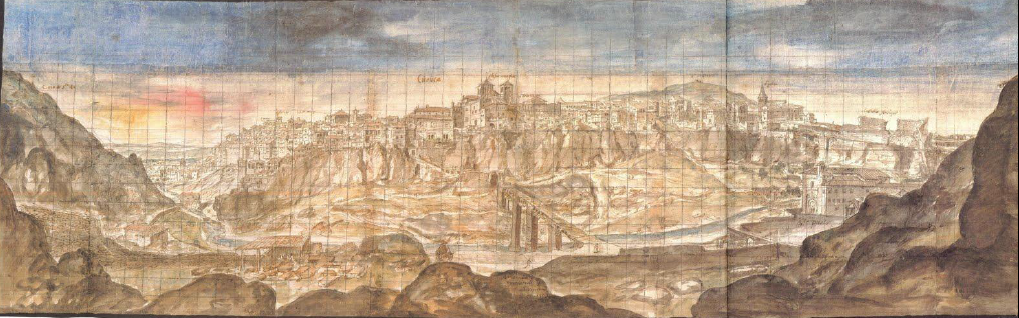
Cuenca by Anton van den Wyngaerde (1565).

During the next few centuries Cuenca enjoyed prosperity, thanks to textile manufacturing and livestock exploitation. The cathedral started to be built at that time, in an Anglo-Norman style, with many French workers, since Alfonso VIII's wife, Eleanor, had French cultural affinity.

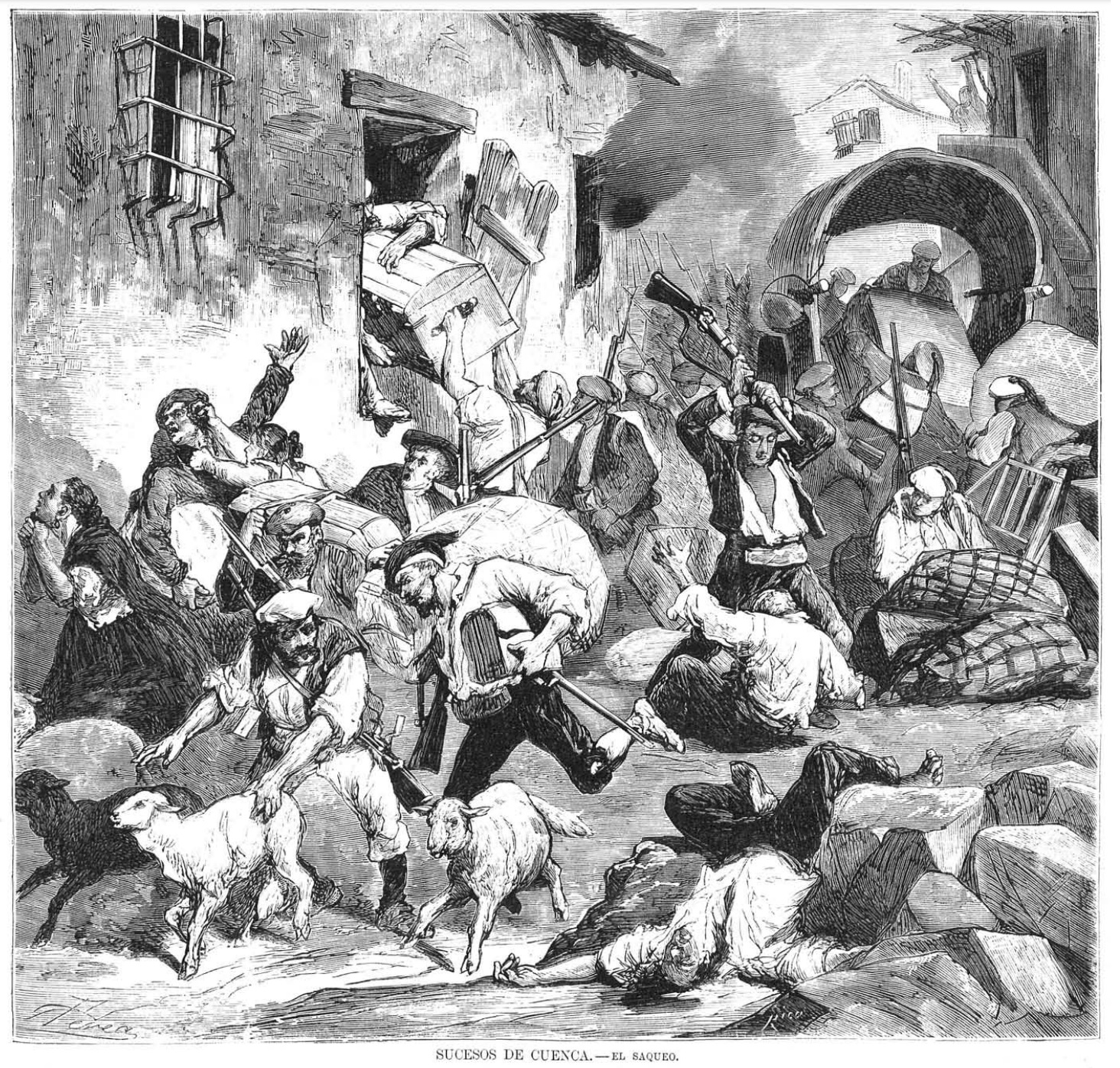
Engraving in La Ilustración Española y Americana depicting the sack of Cuenca by Carlists in July 1874

Historically, there was a Sephardic Jewish community in Cuenca first recorded in 1177 until the expulsion of the Jews from Spain in 1492. In the 16th and 17th centuries, the Inquisition continued to prosecute the descendants of the conversos of Cuenca. The last trial took place from 1718-1725, where hundreds of crypto-Jews were cruelly persecuted under Philip V of Spain.

During the 18th century the textile industry declined, especially when Carlos IV forbade this activity in Cuenca in order to prevent competition with the Real Fábrica de Tapices (Royal Tapestry Factory), and Cuenca's economy declined, thus losing population dramatically (5,000 inhabitants). During the independence war against Napoleon's troops the city suffered great destruction, and it made the crisis worse. The city lost population, with only around 6,000 inhabitants, and only the arrival of railroads in the 19th century, together with the timber industry, were able to boost Cuenca moderately, and population increased as a result to reach 10,000 inhabitants. In 1874, during the Third Carlist War, Cuenca was taken over by Carlist troops, and the city suffered great damage once more.

The 20th century began with the collapse of the Giraldo cathedral's tower in 1902, which affected also the façade. The first decades of the 20th century were as turbulent as in other regions of Spain. There was poverty in rural areas, and the Catholic Church was attacked, with monks, nuns, priests and a bishop of Cuenca, Cruz Laplana y Laguna, being murdered. During the Spanish Civil War Cuenca was part of the republican zone (Zona roja or: "the red zone"). It was taken in 1938 by General Franco's troops. During the post-war period the area suffered a major economic decline, causing many people to migrate to more prosperous regions, mainly the Basque Country and Catalonia, but also to other countries such as Germany. The city started to recover slowly from 1960 to 1970, and the town limits reached far beyond the gorge to the flat surroundings.

In recent decades the city has experienced a moderate growth in population and economy, the latter especially due to the growing tourism sector, and both of them fuelled by improvements in road and train communications. Cuenca has strongly bet on culture and as a result of this it was declared a World Heritage Site in 1996. In recent years, new cultural infrastructure such as the municipal Concert Hall and the Science Museum saw Cuenca unsuccessfully apply for the title of European Capital of Culture in 2016.

In recent years, the city has expanded its technological and cultural infrastructure to include initiatives in digital fabrication and open-source education through the development of local fab lab communities.

== Geography and climate ==
Cuenca is located across a steep spur, whose slopes descend into deep gorges of the Júcar and Huécar rivers. It is divided into two separate settlements: the "new" city is situated south-west of the old one, which is divided by the Huécar course.

The climate of Cuenca is the typical hot-summer Mediterranean climate of Spain's "Meseta" (inner plateau). Winters are relatively cold, but summers are quite hot during the day with occasional cool nights. Spring and autumn seasons are short, with pleasant temperatures during the day but with rather cold nights due to its altitude from 956 m (3,136 ft) above sea level up to 1,000 m (3,281 ft) in the old town.

Climate data for Cuenca 948 m (1981–2010)
Month	Jan	Feb	Mar	Apr	May	Jun	Jul	Aug	Sep	Oct	Nov	Dec	Year
Record high °C (°F)	22.6 (72.7)	24.5 (76.1)	26.9 (80.4)	29.0 (84.2)	35.1 (95.2)	38.0 (100.4)	39.6 (103.3)	39.7 (103.5)	38.2 (100.8)	31.5 (88.7)	25.5 (77.9)	21.2 (70.2)	39.7 (103.5)
Mean daily maximum °C (°F)	9.7 (49.5)	11.5 (52.7)	15.1 (59.2)	16.6 (61.9)	20.9 (69.6)	27.3 (81.1)	31.4 (88.5)	30.7 (87.3)	25.6 (78.1)	19.2 (66.6)	13.3 (55.9)	10.1 (50.2)	19.3 (66.7)
Daily mean °C (°F)	4.6 (40.3)	5.9 (42.6)	8.8 (47.8)	10.6 (51.1)	14.6 (58.3)	20.1 (68.2)	23.6 (74.5)	23.2 (73.8)	18.8 (65.8)	13.4 (56.1)	8.3 (46.9)	5.4 (41.7)	13.1 (55.6)
Mean daily minimum °C (°F)	−0.5 (31.1)	0.2 (32.4)	2.5 (36.5)	4.5 (40.1)	8.2 (46.8)	12.8 (55.0)	15.7 (60.3)	15.6 (60.1)	11.9 (53.4)	7.7 (45.9)	3.2 (37.8)	0.7 (33.3)	6.9 (44.4)
Record low °C (°F)	−17.8 (0.0)	−14.5 (5.9)	−15.6 (3.9)	−5.8 (21.6)	−1.4 (29.5)	1.6 (34.9)	3.5 (38.3)	4.8 (40.6)	1.2 (34.2)	−4.6 (23.7)	−8.2 (17.2)	−12.8 (9.0)	−17.8 (0.0)
Average precipitation mm (inches)	40 (1.6)	38 (1.5)	35 (1.4)	58 (2.3)	52 (2.0)	41 (1.6)	10 (0.4)	20 (0.8)	42 (1.7)	60 (2.4)	48 (1.9)	58 (2.3)	501 (19.7)
Average precipitation days (≥ 1 mm)	6.5	5.9	5.5	8.4	8.3	4.6	1.7	2.6	4.8	7.9	7.2	8	71.4
Average snowy days	2.3	2	1.1	0.7	0	0	0	0	0	0.1	0.8	1.3	8.3
Average relative humidity (%)	73	67	60	60	56	48	41	45	55	67	73	76	60
Mean monthly sunshine hours	154	162	211	206	258	309	357	329	246	188	151	136	2,707
Source: Agencia Estatal de Meteorología

Historic Walled Town of Cuenca
UNESCO World Heritage Site
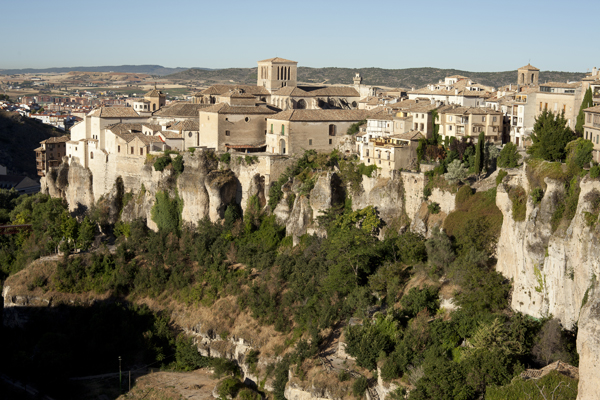
- Interactive map of Historic Walled Town of Cuenca
- Criteria: Cultural: ii, v
- Reference: 781
- Inscription: 1996 (20th Session)
- Area: 22.79 ha (56.3 acres)
- Buffer zone: 170.49 ha (421.3 acres)

== Main sights ==
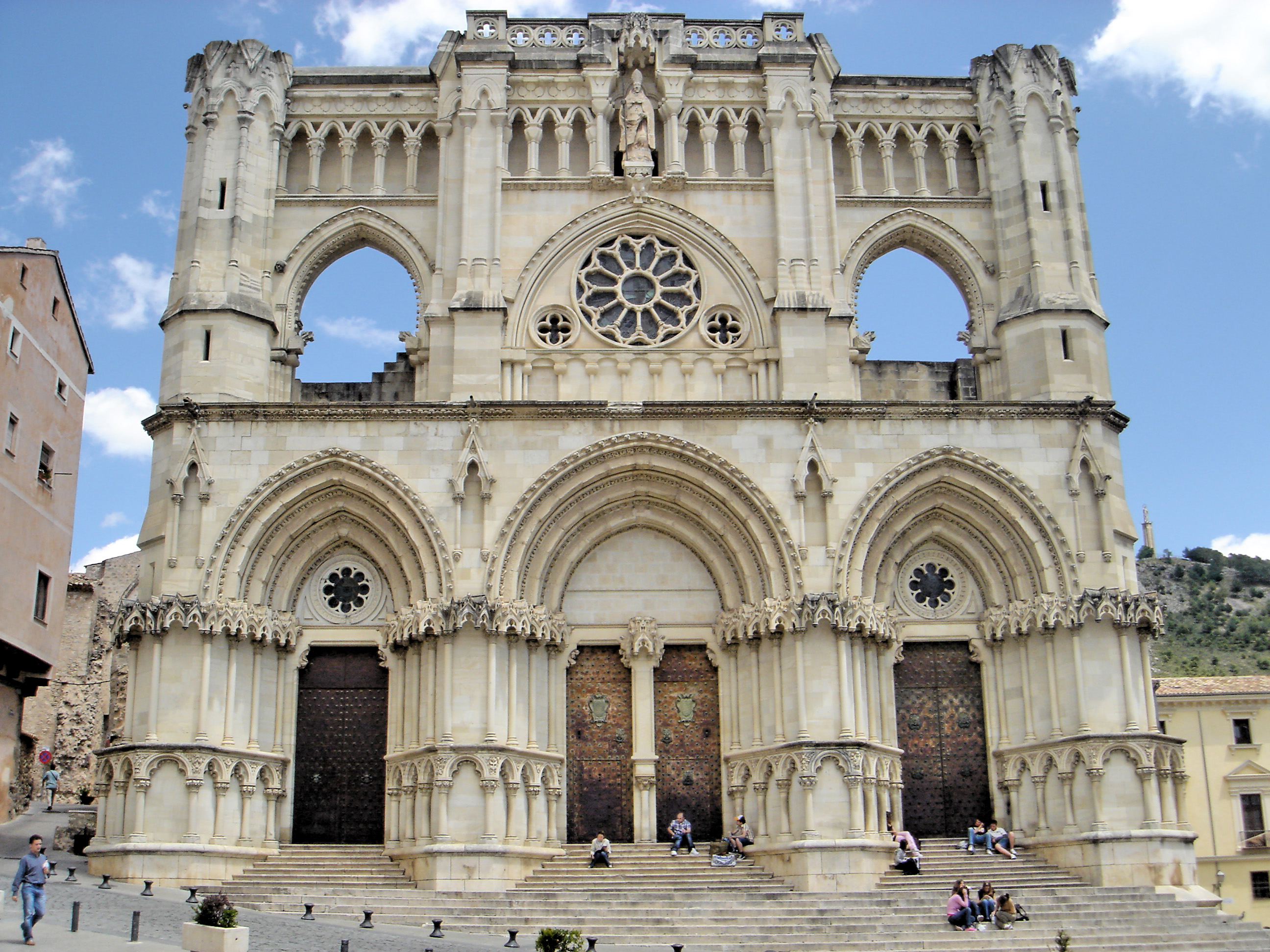
Cuenca Cathedral

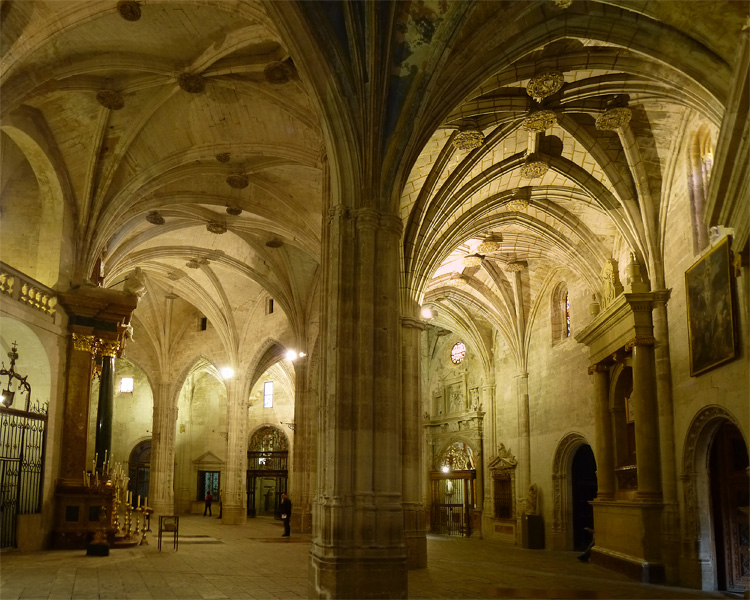
The cathedral apse-aisle

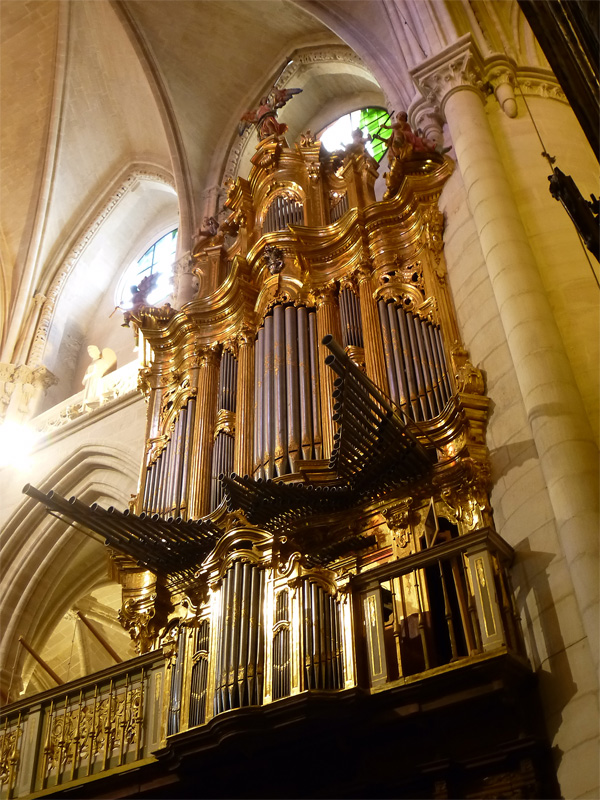
The cathedral's pipe organs

=== Cathedral of Our Lady of Grace and Saint Julian ===
Cuenca Cathedral was built from 1182 to 1270. The façade was rebuilt after it crumbled down in 1902. It is the first gothic style Cathedral in Spain (together with Avila's), because of the influence of Queen Eleanor, the wife of Alfonso VIII and daughter of King Henry II of England and Queen Eleanor of Aquitaine, who introduced the Anglo-Norman style.

From that date the cathedral has undergone some changes. An apse-aisle (doble girola) was added in the 15th century, while the Renaissance Esteban Jamete's Arch was erected in the 16th century. The main altar was redesigned during the 18th century by famous architect Ventura Rodríguez: it features a precious iron-work gate. The façade was rebuilt in 1902 from ruins due to the collapse of the bell tower, the Giraldo, by Vicente Lámperez, with two new twin towers at both ends of the façade, which have remained unfinished without the upper part of them. In the early 1990s modern coloured windows were installed, and in 2006 one of the two old baroque organs from Julián de la Orden was recovered. The other organ has also been restored, and on 4 April 2009 an inauguration ceremony was held.

The naves do not follow exactly a straight line. The San Julián altar, dedicated to Saint Julian of Cuenca, at the apse-aisle, consists of columns made of green marble.

Another curiosity are the "Unum ex septem" signs at some chapels. It is said that if one prays looking at these signs one would obtain a five-year forgiveness for one's sins, and seven years if one prays during the patron saint's day.

=== Church of Saint Peter ===
With Romanesque origins, the church of St. Peter (San Pedro in Spanish) was rebuilt by Jose Martín de la Aldehuela during the 18th century and displays since that time a Baroque façade. It shows an octagonal shape outdoors but it is circular inside, and it is located at Plaza del Trabuco.

This church can be reached by going up along San Pedro Street from Plaza Mayor.

=== Church of Saint Michael ===
The Church of Saint Michael (Iglesia de San Miguel in Spanish) was erected during the 13th century, with only one nave and an apse. In the 15th century, a second nave at the north side was added. The dome was built by Esteban Jamete in the 16th century, and finally the wooden ceiling of the two naves was replaced with stone vaults during the 18th century.

Saint Michael was restored in the 20th century, and its management was transferred to Cuenca's municipality from Cuenca's diocese, so that this church could be used to hold classical music concerts. In fact, Saint Michael is home of the Religious Music Week (Semana de Musica Religiosa) together with other places within the city and its province.

It is located at San Miguel street, next to Plaza Mayor. Saint Michael is accessed through a descending narrow passage which starts at Plaza Mayor left lateral (looking from the Town Hall).

=== Church of Our Savior (Iglesia del Salvador) ===
Built in Neo-Gothic style during the 18th century, with only one nave and a high tower. It shows a modest baroque façade and some remarkable baroque altars indoors. The door is however quite modern, added in the late 1990s.

The famous religious procession "Las Turbas", held on Good Friday morning, starts at this location, since the image of "Jesús el Nazareno", which is at the forefront of the procession, is kept within "El Salvador".

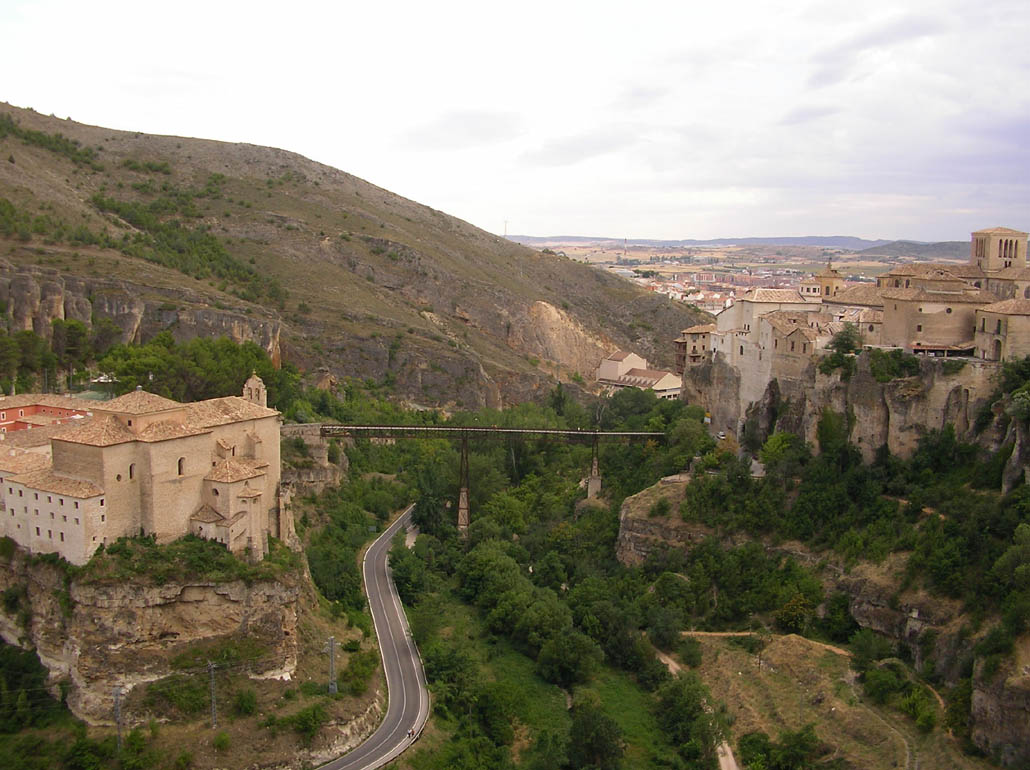
St. Paul Bridge viewed looking towards the plain with the Old Convent of St Paul on the left.

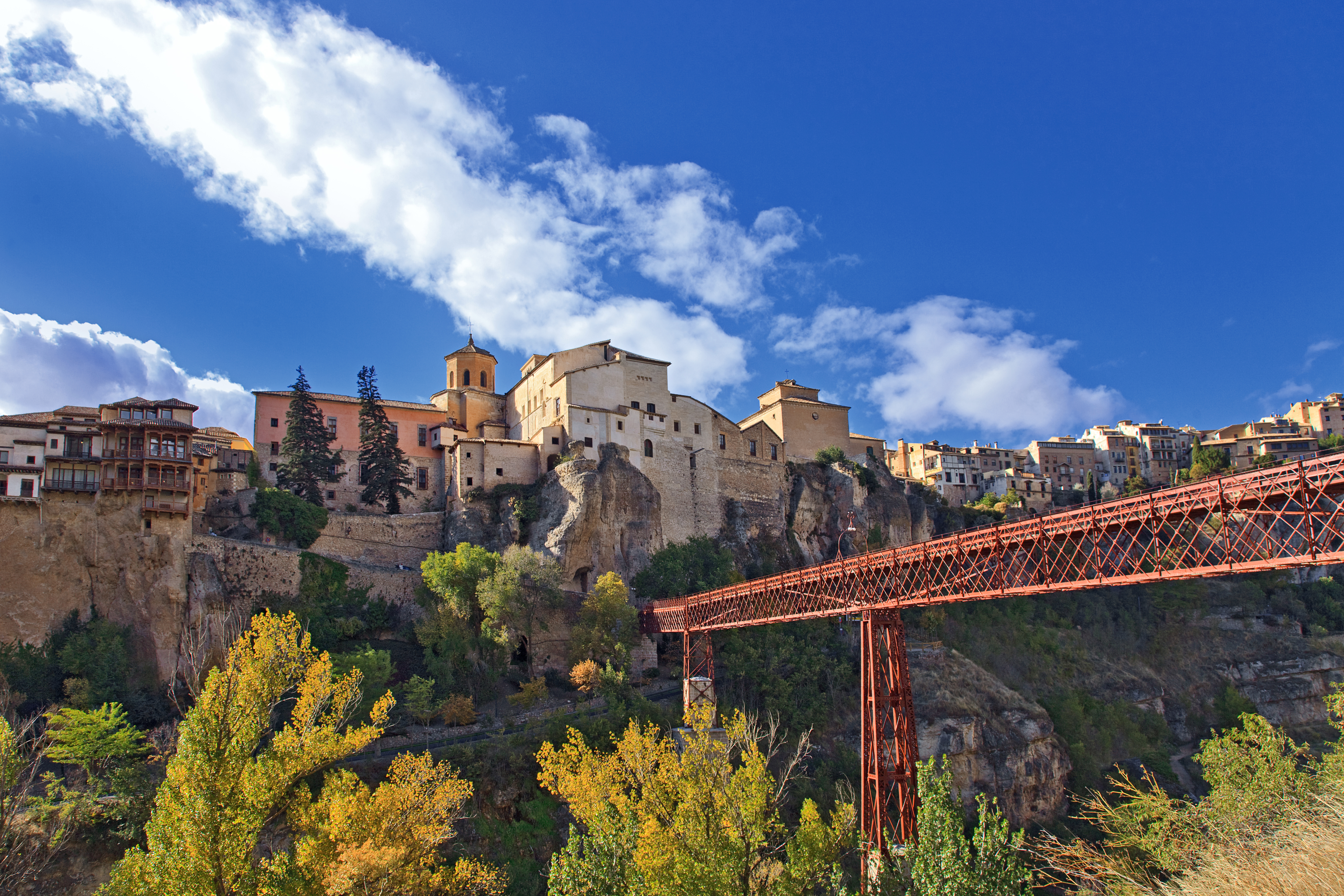
St. Paul Bridge.

=== Bridge of Saint Paul ===
The bridge of Saint Paul (Puente de San Pablo) was built from 1533 to 1589, a construction driven by the canon Juan del Pozo, over the gorge of the River Huecar, aiming at connecting the old town with St Paul convent.

The original bridge collapsed, and the current one was built in 1902, made of wood and iron according to the style dominating at the beginning of the 20th century. It is up to 40 metres high and supported by the remains of the old bridge.

=== Seminary ===
The Seminary (Seminario), a rectangular building stretching from Plaza de la Merced to Mangana Square, was established under the rule of José Flores y Osorio, the Bishop of Cuenca (1738–1759), and built by Vicente Sevill, around 1745. The Baroque façade at Plaza de la Merced was erected in 1748.

It holds a library with numerous ancient books, some of them incunabula (previous to 1501). There is also a Rococo meeting room inside and a Gothic altarpiece at the chapel, but visits are not allowed.

In 2004 some books from this library were stolen, but the suspect of the robbery was caught and the books recovered before entering on an auction process.

Now an average of 10–15 future priests are trained there, according to statistics of the Spanish Episcopal Conference.[1]

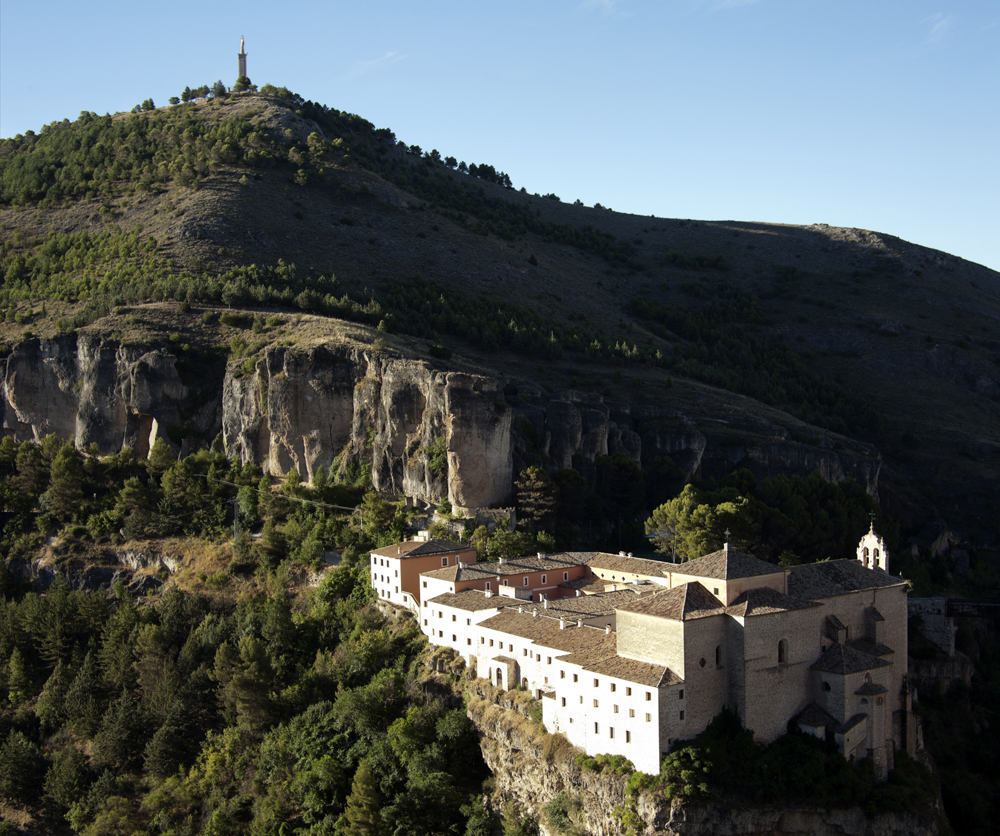
Convent of Saint Paul

=== Old convent of Saint Paul ===
The convent of Saint Paul was built in the 16th century by command of the canon priest Juan del Pozo, a monk belonging to the Dominican Order. Brothers Juan and Pedro de Alviz were in charge of the building project; Pedro worked on the convent and the cloister and Juan on the church.

The church was finished in the 18th century, in rococo style.

The convent was ruled by Dominican friars, but during the 19th century was handed over to the Pauline Fathers, who were based here until 1975, when they left due to the possible collapse of the building. In the 1990s the convent was restored to house the Parador Nacional de Turismo in Cuenca, a hotel which allows the visit to the convent as well as the access to the church.

The cloister has an ornamental source of water, and the cafeteria is the old chapel. From the convent the old town can be reached easily by crossing St Paul bridge.

=== Bishop's Palace ===
The bishop's palace features, on three of its museums, the Diocese's Museum, which has a collection of religious art. It can be easily accessed from the cathedral.

The rooms where the collection is shown were remodeled by architect Fernando Barja Noguerol, and Gustavo Torner selected the art pieces from an inventory made by some priests of the Diocese in 1977. Some of the diocese's artistic patrimony was lost during the Peninsular War, the confiscation of ecclesiastical property by Juan Álvarez Mendizábal, and the Spanish Civil War.

Masterpieces like The Byzantine Diptych (book-like silver work whose origin is dated around 1370, containing saints' relics), paintings by El Greco, and handcrafted carpets from Cuenca's school, can be seen at the museum.

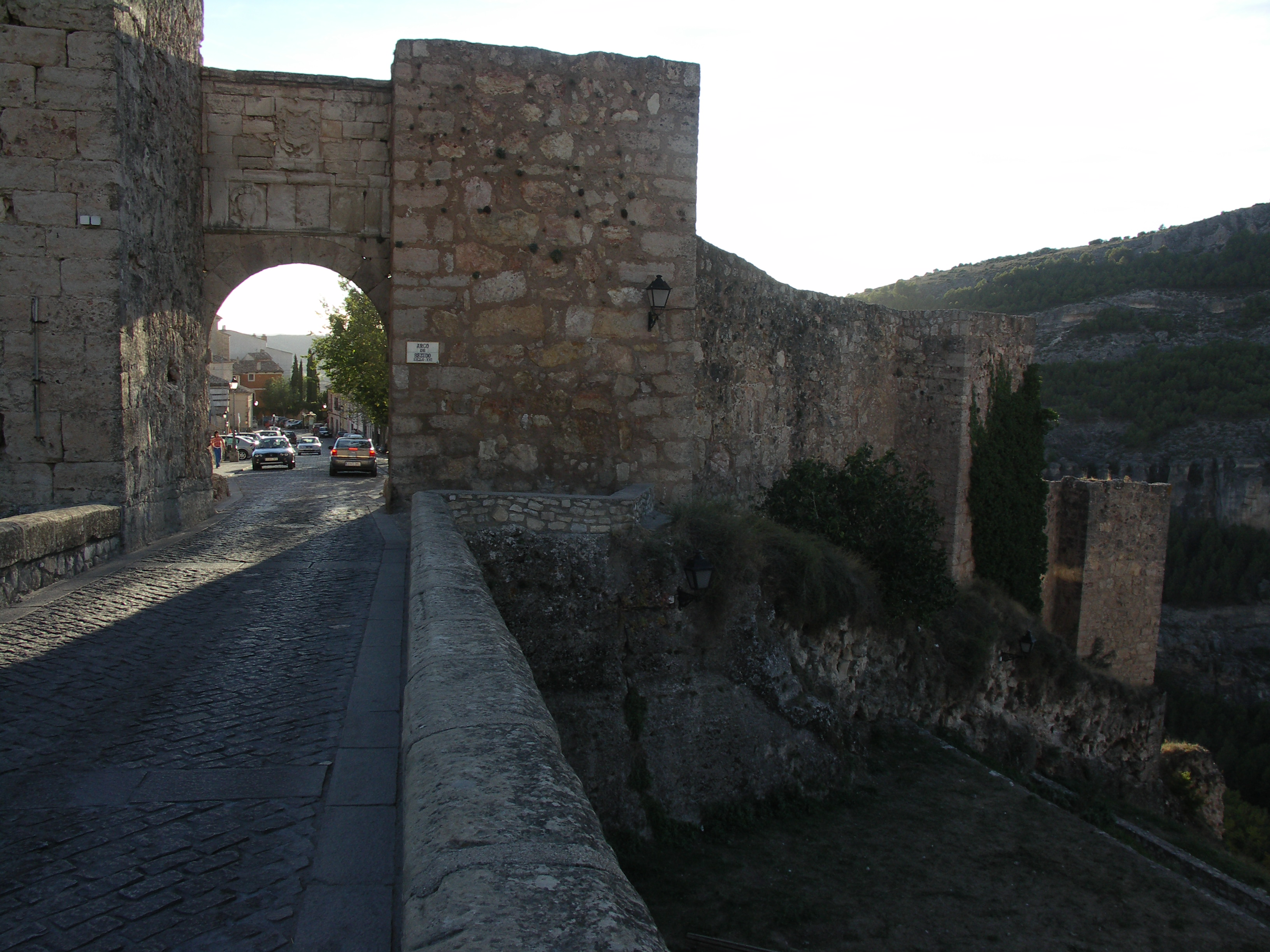
Outside view of El Castillo (The Castle) and the City Walls.

=== The Castle ===
El Castillo is the name for the remains of an ancient Arab fortress, representing the older structures of Cuenca. Only a tower, two stone blocks, the arch which allows to enter or leave the old town from the Barrio del Castillo and a fragment of the walls have been left. The arch (arco de Bezudo) is named after Gutierre Rodriguez Bezudo, from Segovia, who fought the Arabs with King Alfonso VIII to conquer Cuenca.

In the Muslim era, the historian Ibn Al-Abbar mentions that once upon a time, the imam of the mosque of the citadel of Cuenca was Ja'far bin Isa Al-Umawi (from Umayyad lineage), a distinguished scholar, poet and expert in the Arabic language who died in AD 1068 (460 A.H.).

The castle was home of the Holy Inquisition after 1583, and it was finally destroyed during the 19th century by French soldiers during the Spanish War of Independence.

Nearby are the small chapel and cemetery of San Isidro.

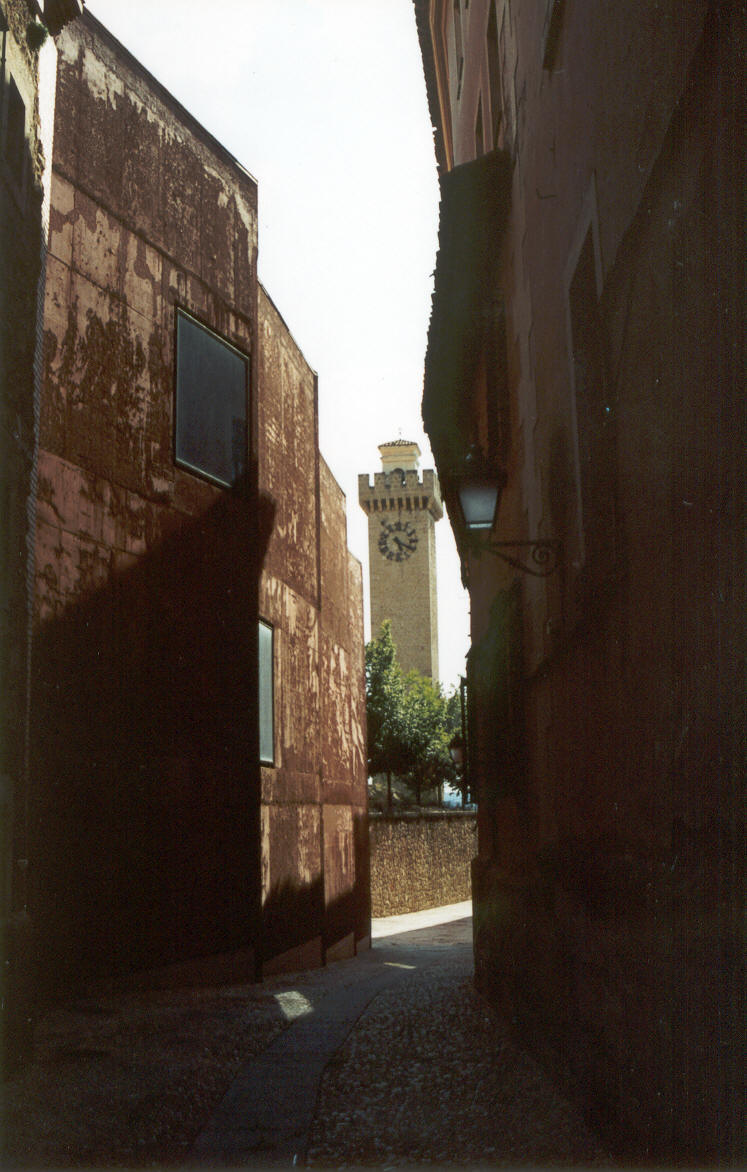
Mangana Tower

=== Mangana Tower ===
The origins of the Mangana Tower remain unclear. In 1565 it was painted by Anton van den Wyngaerde, which indicates that at that time Mangana had already been built up, and after the attacks by French soldiers during the Spanish War of Independence war – at the beginning of the 19th century – and having been hit previously by a lightning strike in the 18th century, it became badly damaged. Mangana Tower was rebuilt by Fernando Alcántara in Neomudejar style – inspired on Arab decorative motifs – in 1926. Finally, Victor Caballero gave Mangana its current look in a fortress-like style in 1968.

It has a clock on one of its walls and a recording of bell chimes can be heard in the old town at certain times (every quarter of an hour).

There are views from the near viewpoints over the river Jucar's gorge and the modern neighbourhoods. Mangana can be reached on foot from Plaza Mayor.

=== Town Hall ===
The Town Hall is a building in baroque style built up during the ruling period of King Carlos III and supported over three Roman arches. It was finished in 1762, as it can be read on the façade. Nevertheless, in the 18th century Mateo Lopez was the architect in charge of the extension of the building since it was necessary to amply the building for the oratory as well as the archive.

The central arch is the only one giving access to vehicles to Plaza Mayor.

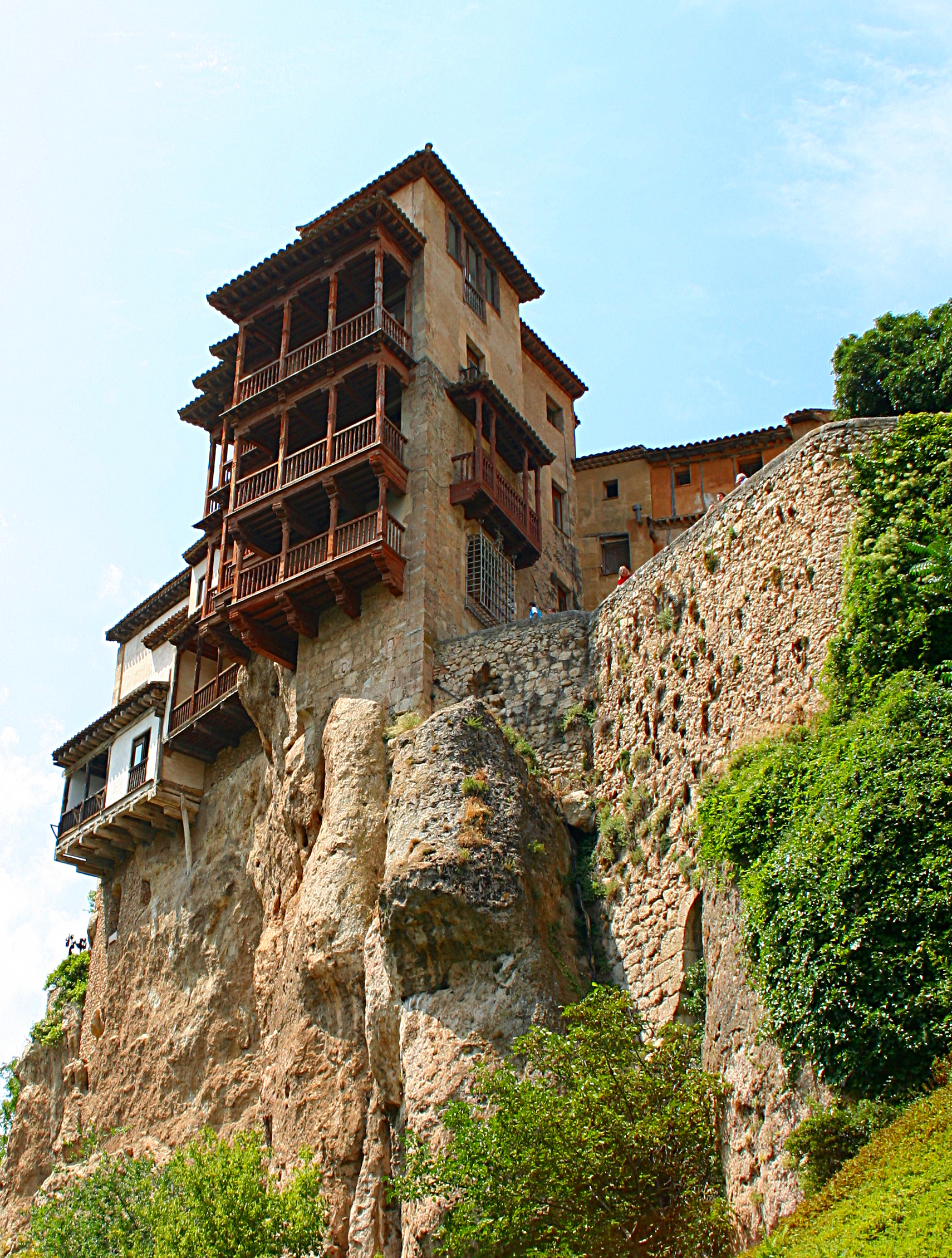
Hanging houses

=== Hanging Houses ===
Built over a rock above the Huecar River gorge in the 15th century, Las Casas Colgadas are the only remaining samples of this type of building which was common in this city a long time ago.

Hanging Houses can be considered the most famous civil buildings in Cuenca. They house a restaurant and the Museum of Abstract Arts and they serve as the background of millions of photos made from the bridge of San Pablo.

=== Monument devoted to the Sacred Heart of Jesus ===
On top of the Cerro del Socorro you can find the monument devoted to the Holy Heart of Jesus, whose materials were transported on donkeys in the mid-20th century. This place is a magnificent viewpoint over the city. It can be accessed by taking the road to Palomera / Buenache de la Sierra (Huecar river gorge) and turn right after 5 km (3 mi), approx.

=== Cuenca Province Council ===
The provincial council's seat (Diputación provincial de Cuenca) is a building with 2 floors built at the early 20th century according to a project conceived by provincial architect Rafael Alfaro. Cuenca's coat of arms at the façade is made of Carrara marble.

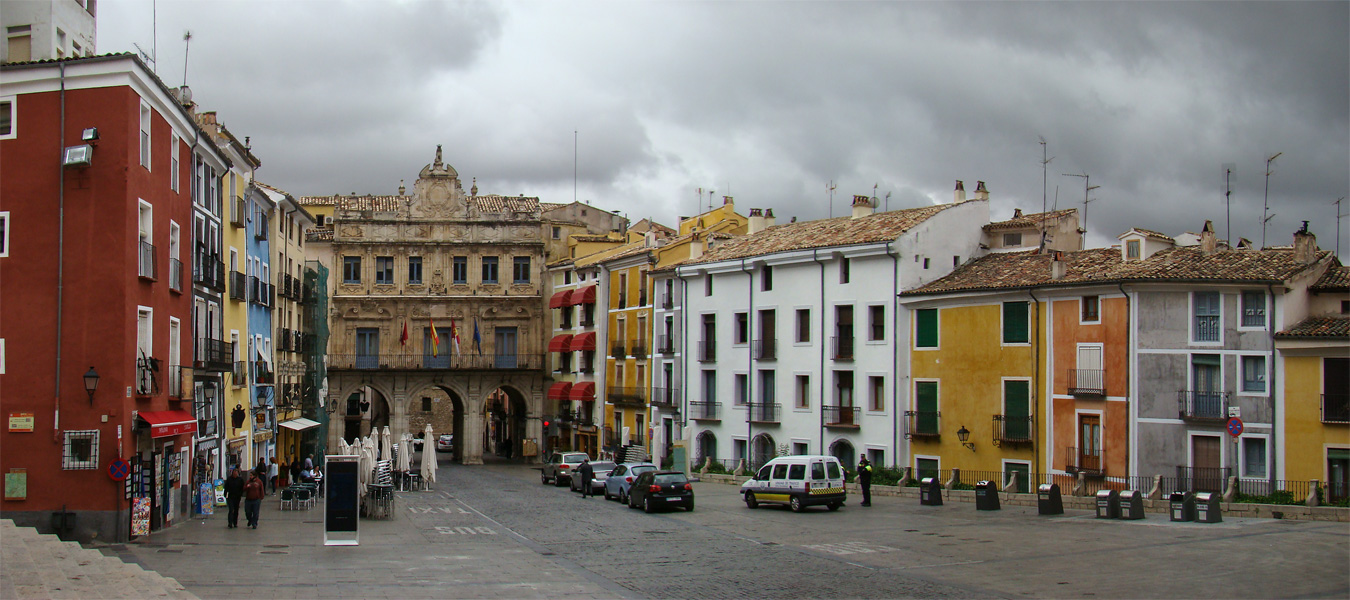
Town Hall and Plaza Mayor.

=== Museums ===
- Archeological Museum which contains items from the Archaeological Park of Segóbriga
- Diocese's Museum
- Museum of Spanish Abstract Art
- Museum of Science of Castile-La Mancha
- Holy Week Museum of Cuenca
- Fundación Antonio Pérez
- Fundación Antonio Saura

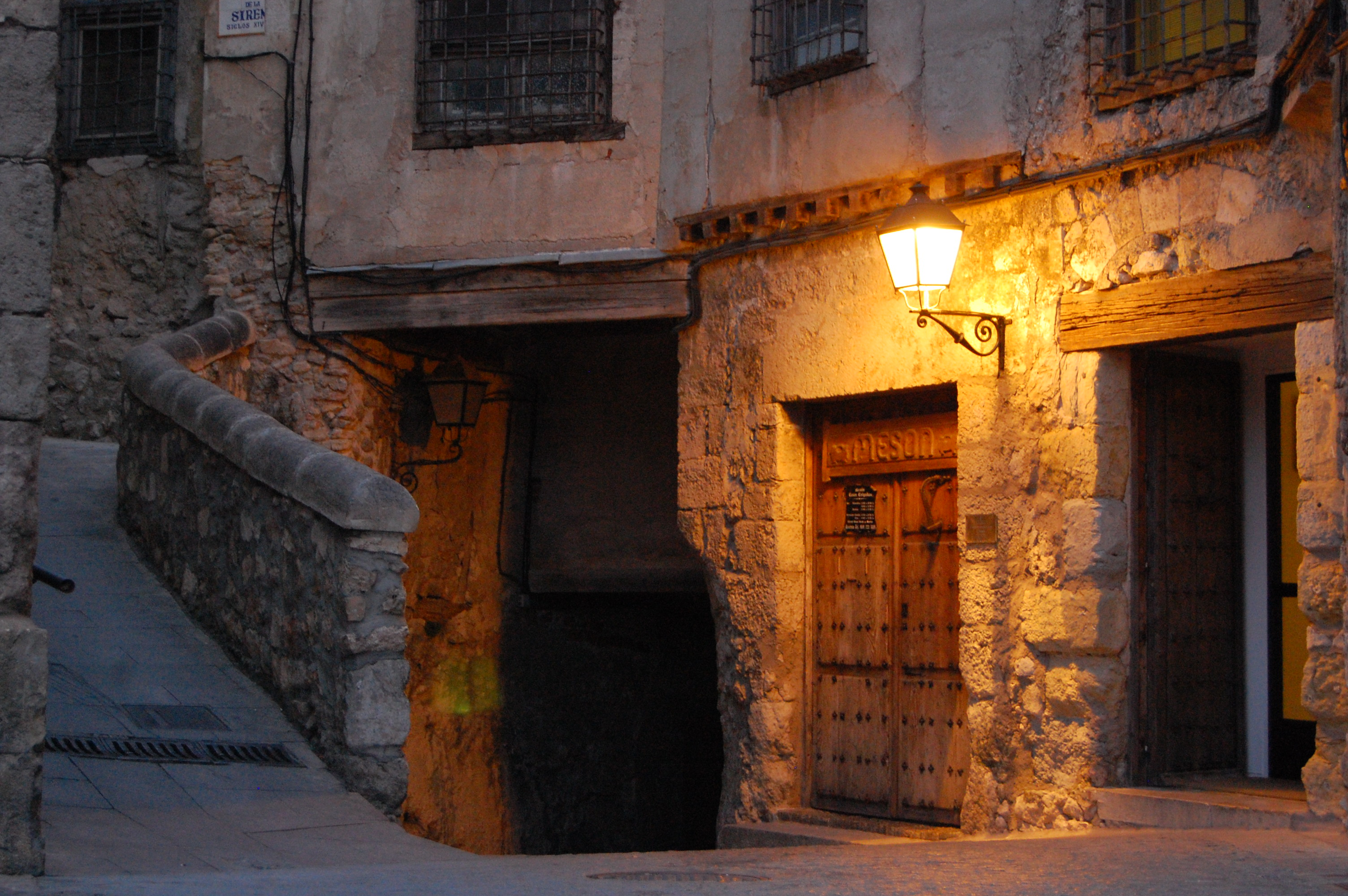
Spanish Abstract Art Museum, in Cuenca.

=== Parks ===
- El Escardillo, with a few trees and a fountain over a small patch of ground. It is one of the few green areas in the old town.
- Los Moralejos: located near the entry point from Madrid, Los Moralejos, also known as "Carrero" (its old name was Carrero Blanco, the VP of General Franco), is a park which was enlarged in the early nighties, when San Julian's fair was moved to its current location, thus releasing some amount of land. A bicycle lane has been built recently, as well as a new connection with the "el Sargal" sport centre.
- Santa Ana, "El Vivero", near to Cuenca's bullring, large trees give shadow to most of the park.
- San Fernando: located in the expansion area of Cuenca, it is settled on a slope and features, among other attractions, three small lakes.
- San Julián, the oldest one in Cuenca, created at the beginning of the 20th century, from land donated by Gregoria Fernández de la Cuba, whose sculpture can be found here. San Julián's park is an example of sustainable design: there is no grass, instead the rectangles of terrain along the perimeter contain large trees, and are separated by bush rows and sand paths. In the centre, an open space houses a bandstand. A sculpture of Lucas Aguirre y Juárez, which devoted its filantropic efforts to education of poor children, is also here. A fully functional "Manneken pis" relieves thirsty passers-by during the summer days.

=== Others ===
Other notable buildings in Cuenca include the San Felipe Neri church, the Our Lady of Light church (Iglesia de Nuestra Señora de La Luz) and the Las Petras convent.

== Festivities ==
- Jueves lardero
- St. Julian's Day (Julian of Cuenca) – 28 January
- Saint Matthew's Day – 21 September: a heifer (vaquilla) is released on the streets being led by people with ropes, while people from Cuenca, grouped in "peñas", eat and drink on the streets during the four-day period. On the first day, peñas get to Plaza Mayor on foot while being watered by the old town's inhabitants from their balconies.
- Holy Week: Fiesta of International Tourist Interest of Spain

== Transportation ==
On 19 December 2010 a new AVE (high-speed rail) link was established between Madrid – Atocha and Valencia and some of the high-speed trains stop at the Cuenca–Fernando Zóbel railway station, some 5 km from the city centre and connected by urban bus route 1, thus providing travellers with frequent connections every day with both Madrid and Valencia, this reduced the journey time to only 50 minutes to/from Madrid and one hour to/from Valencia. Renfe operated a non-high-speed service taking 3 hours going from Madrid, serving the historical station in the city centre, but the conventional line was closed on 2022 July 20 and the station is only served by private high-speed rail operator Iryo. Auto Res, a bus operator, links Madrid to Cuenca with a 2-hour or 2½-hour trip duration. The A-40 motorway, recently completed, connects the city with the A-3 at Tarancón, 82 kilometres (51 mi) away from Madrid, thus totalling 166 kilometres (103 mi) to Spain's capital, and 200 kilometres (120 mi) far from Valencia, via the A-3 in the opposite sense.

== Twin towns – sister cities ==
Cuenca is twinned with:

- Cuenca, Ecuador
- L'Aquila, Italy
- Ronda, Spain
- Plasencia, Spain
- Taxco de Alarcón, Mexico
- Paju, South Korea (2007)
- Cerreto Sannita, Italy (2017)
- Bollène, France (2012)

== Gastronomy ==
The following are typical dishes from the Cuenca area, being basically the result of combining those of Serranía and Mancha areas:

- Ajo arriero, made of cod, potato and garlic, can be spread on bread
- Cordero, some pieces of lamb simply roasted or in caldereta
- Morteruelo, a kind of pâté made of different kinds of meat, mainly hare, partridge, hen and pork.
- Pisto manchego, a mixture of vegetables (tomato, pepper, courgette/zucchini) cut up and fried together, similar to the "ratatouille" from France.
- Queso manchego, coming from Villarejo de Fuentes, Santa María del Campo Rus or Villamayor de Santiago, made only from sheep's milk
- Setas, during the autumn a great variety of mushrooms can be collected in the forests near Cuenca. The most frequent is the so-called Níscalo, but other species, such as boletus, can also be found.
- Trucha, trout from the mountain rivers just grilled
- Oreja, Forro, Panceta: different cuts of pork usually grilled
- Mojete: traditional salad made of tomato.
- Zarajo: lamb chitterlings braided onto a vine and braised or fried.

For dessert, the Alajú is an Arab cake made of honey, almonds, nuts and grated orange rind. Resoli is a typical drink, served in a glass with ice cubes or directly drunk from a "porrón" after a meal.

== Gallery ==
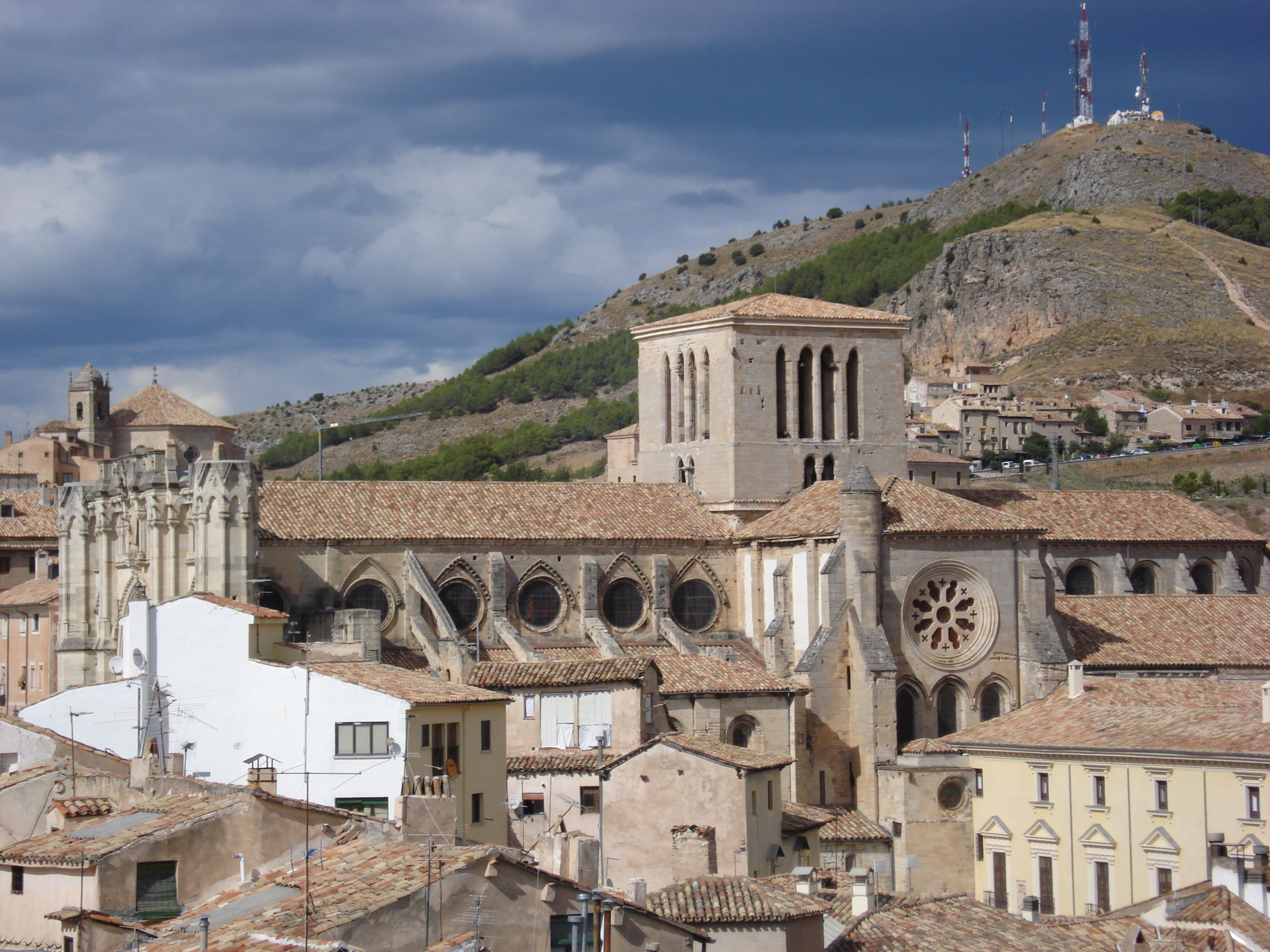
Panoramic view of the Cuenca Cathedral.

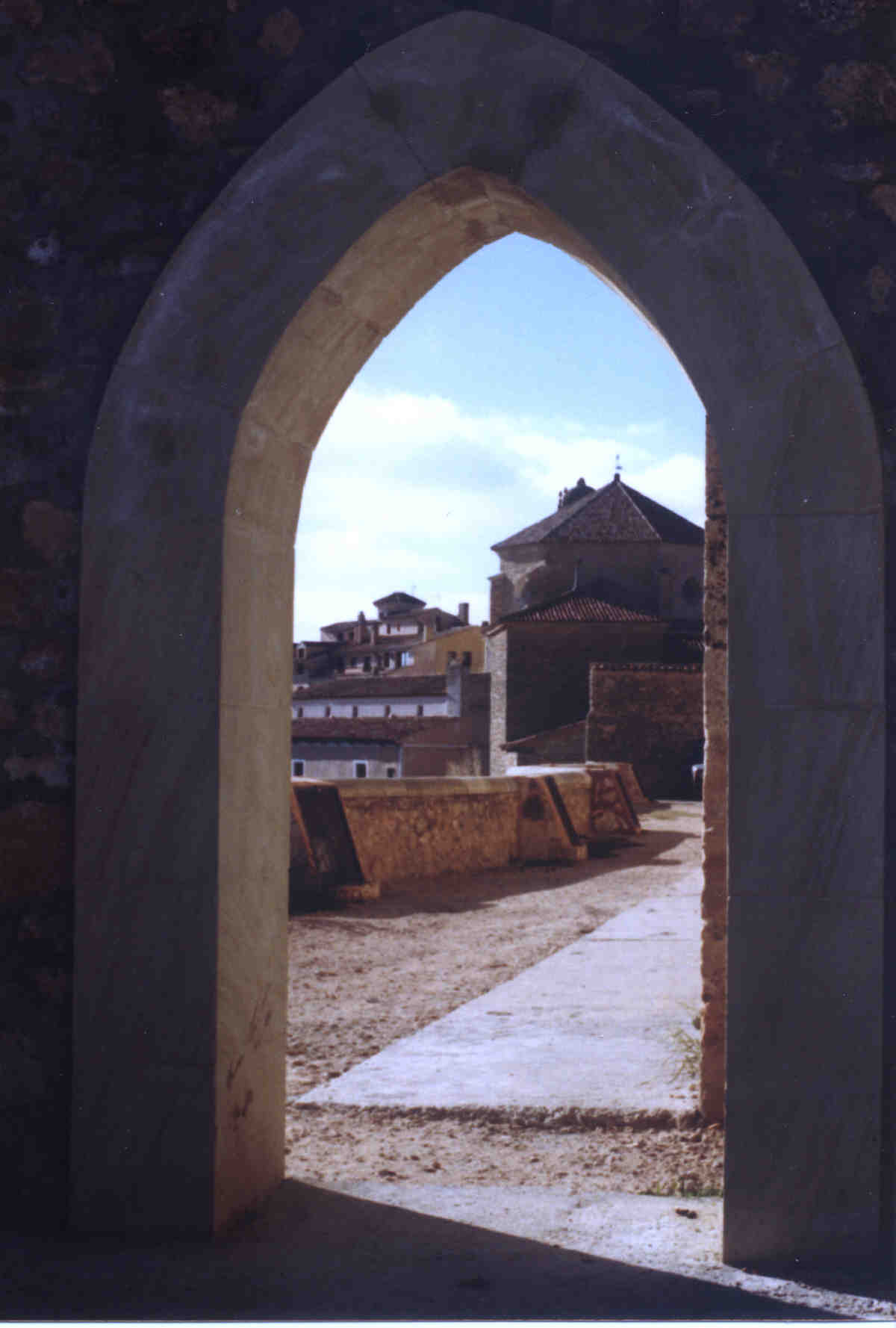
Looking through an arch in old Cuenca.

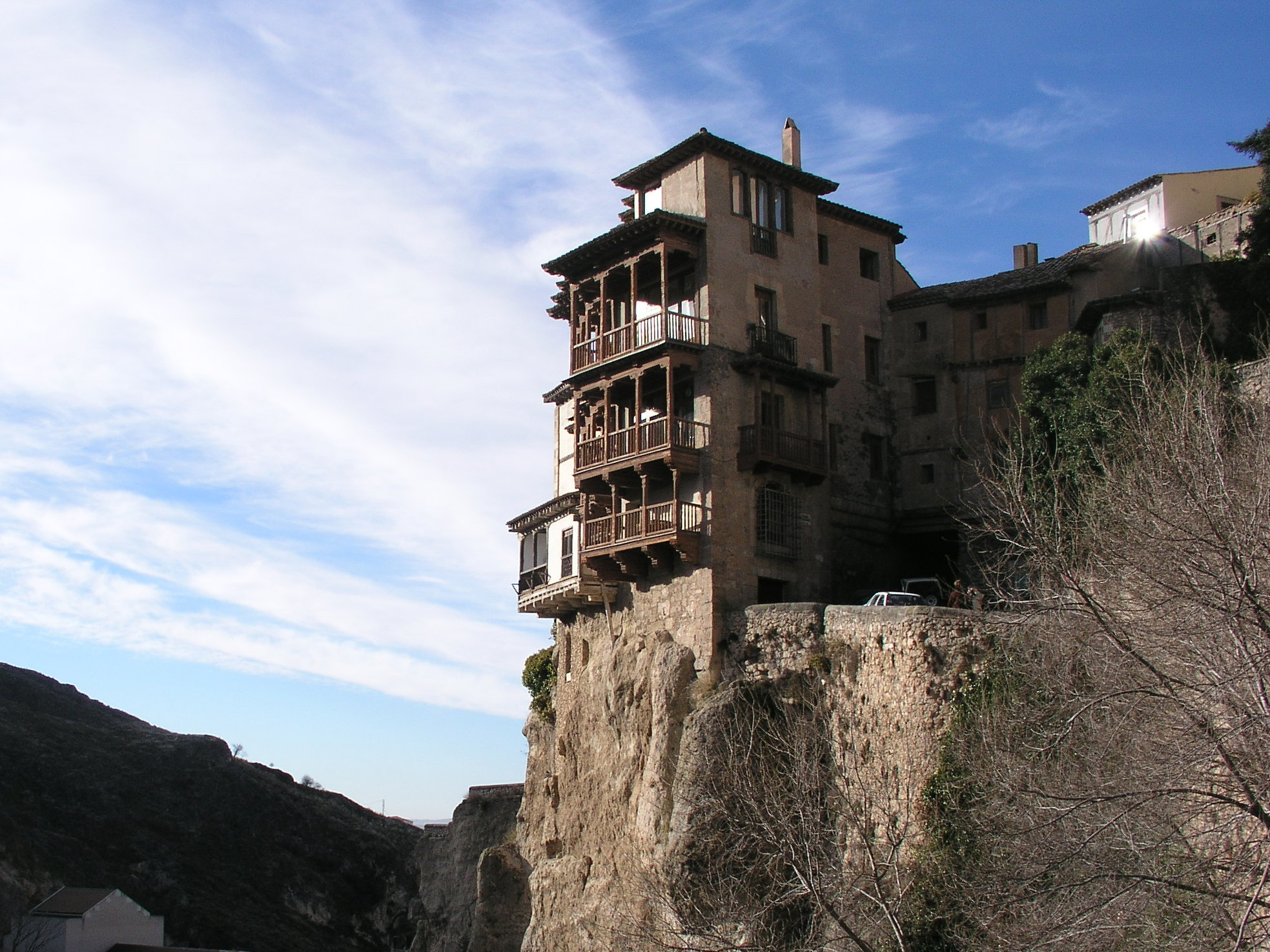
Casas Colgadas (Hanging Houses).

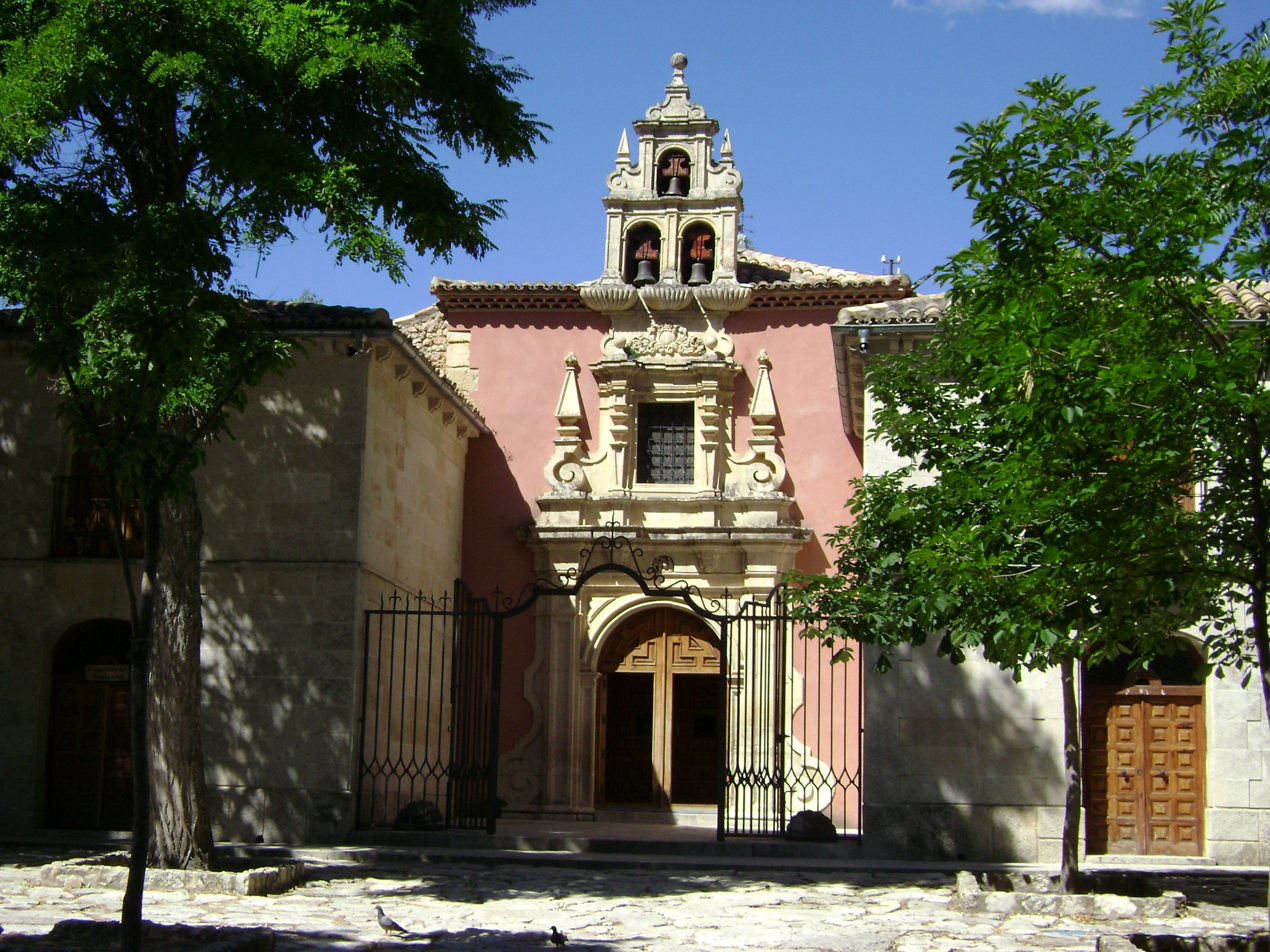
Virgin of the Anguishes hermitage.

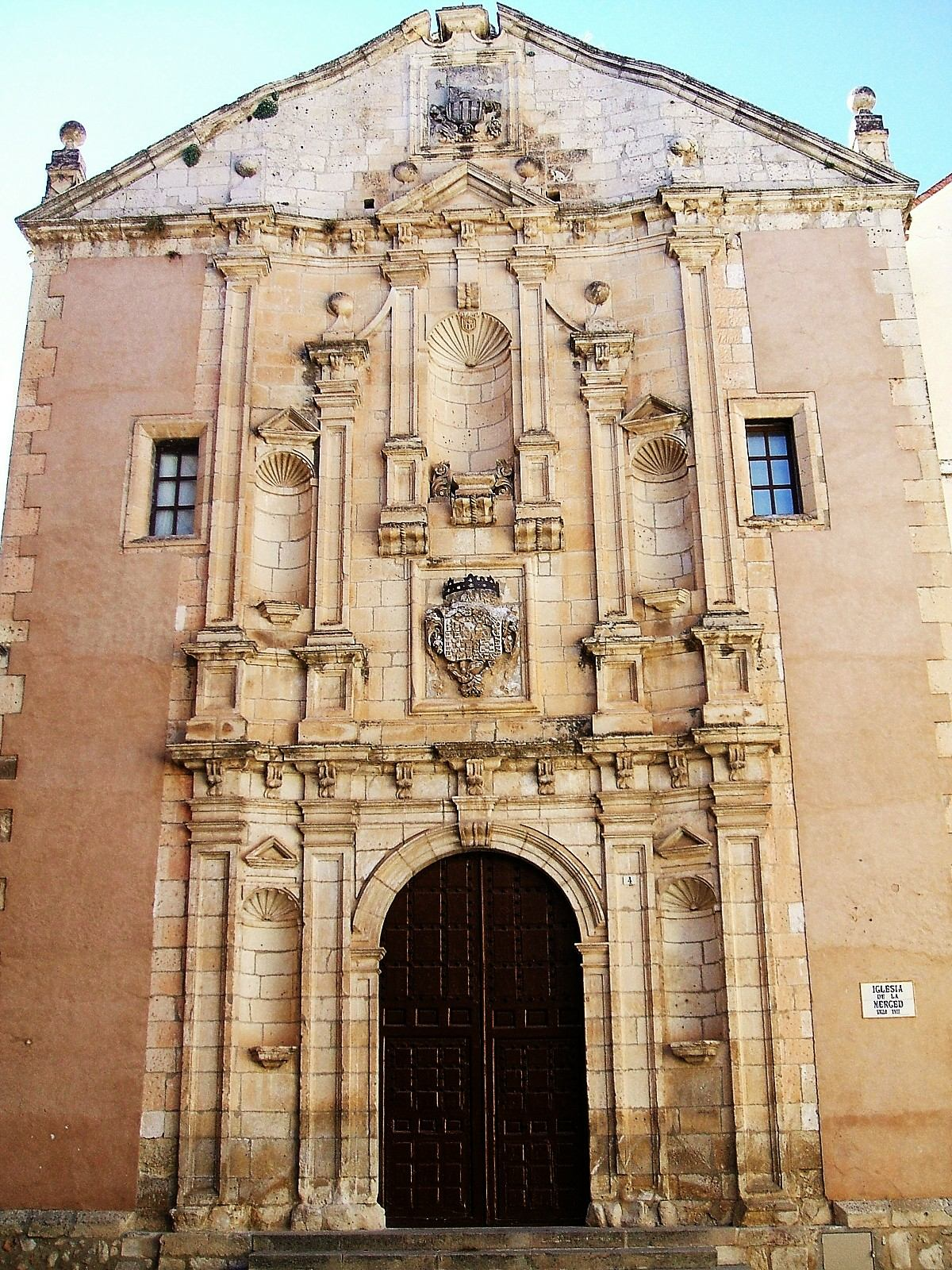
Convent of la Merced.

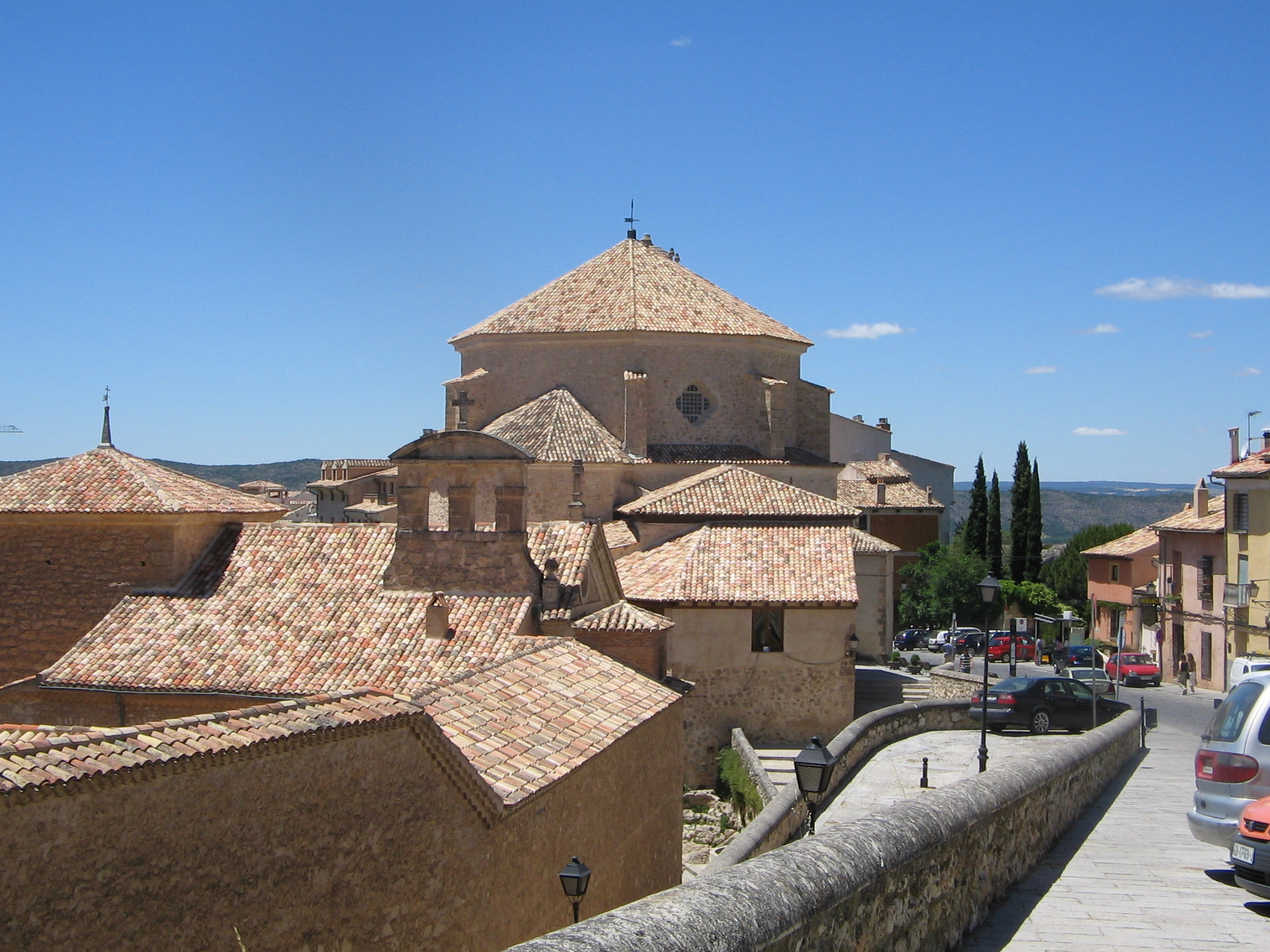
Convent of las Carmelitas.

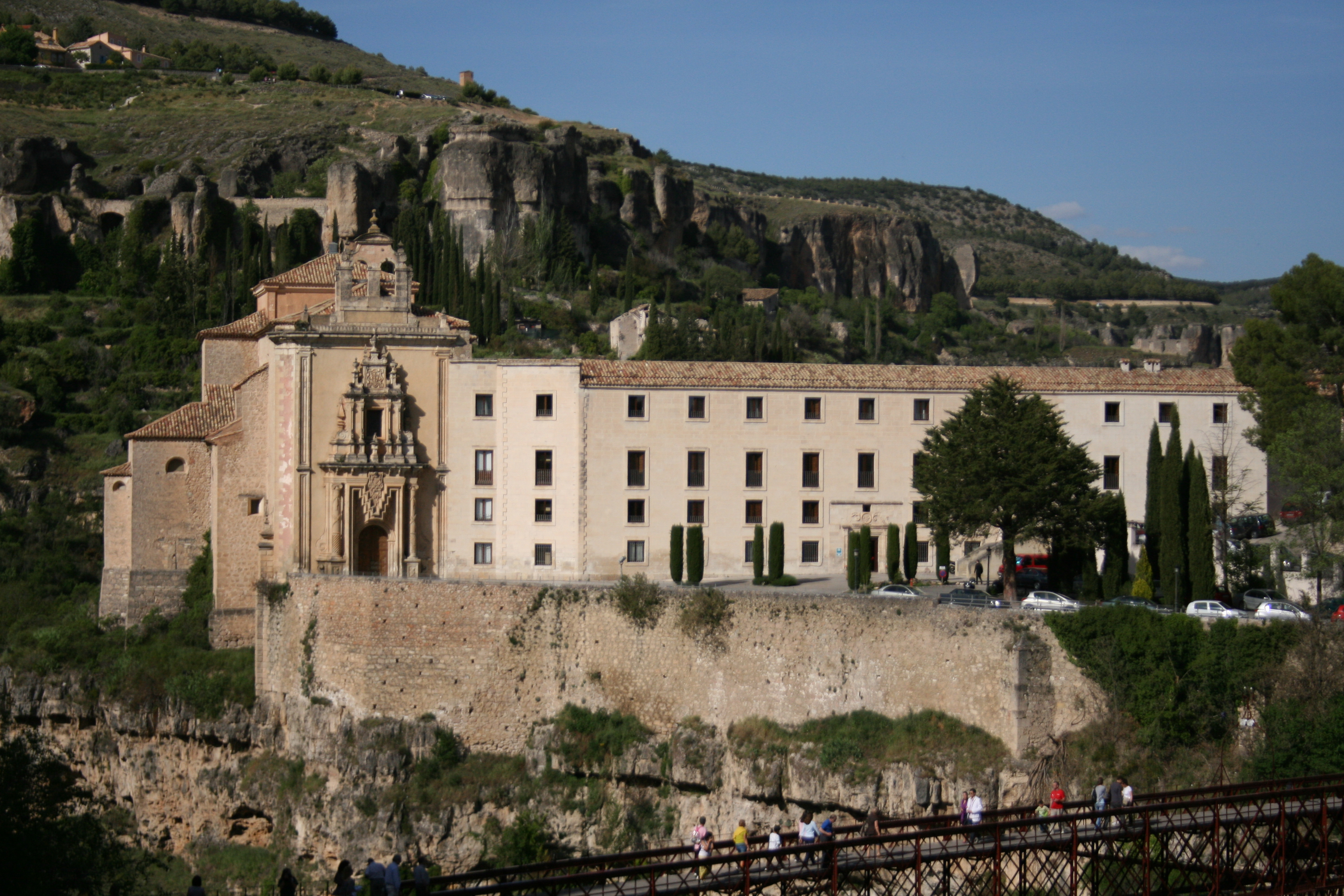
Parador Nacional de Cuenca.

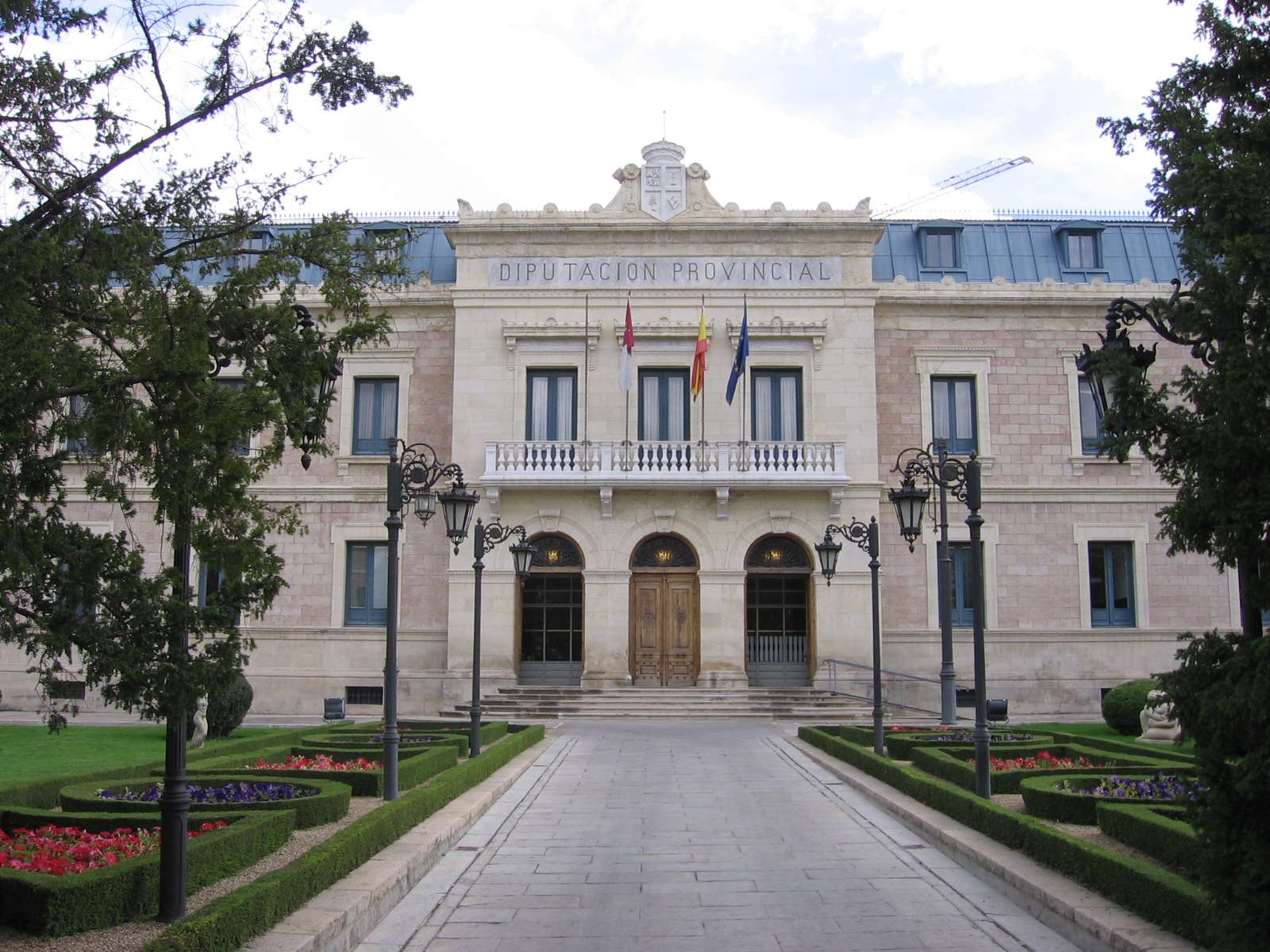
Cuenca's Province council.

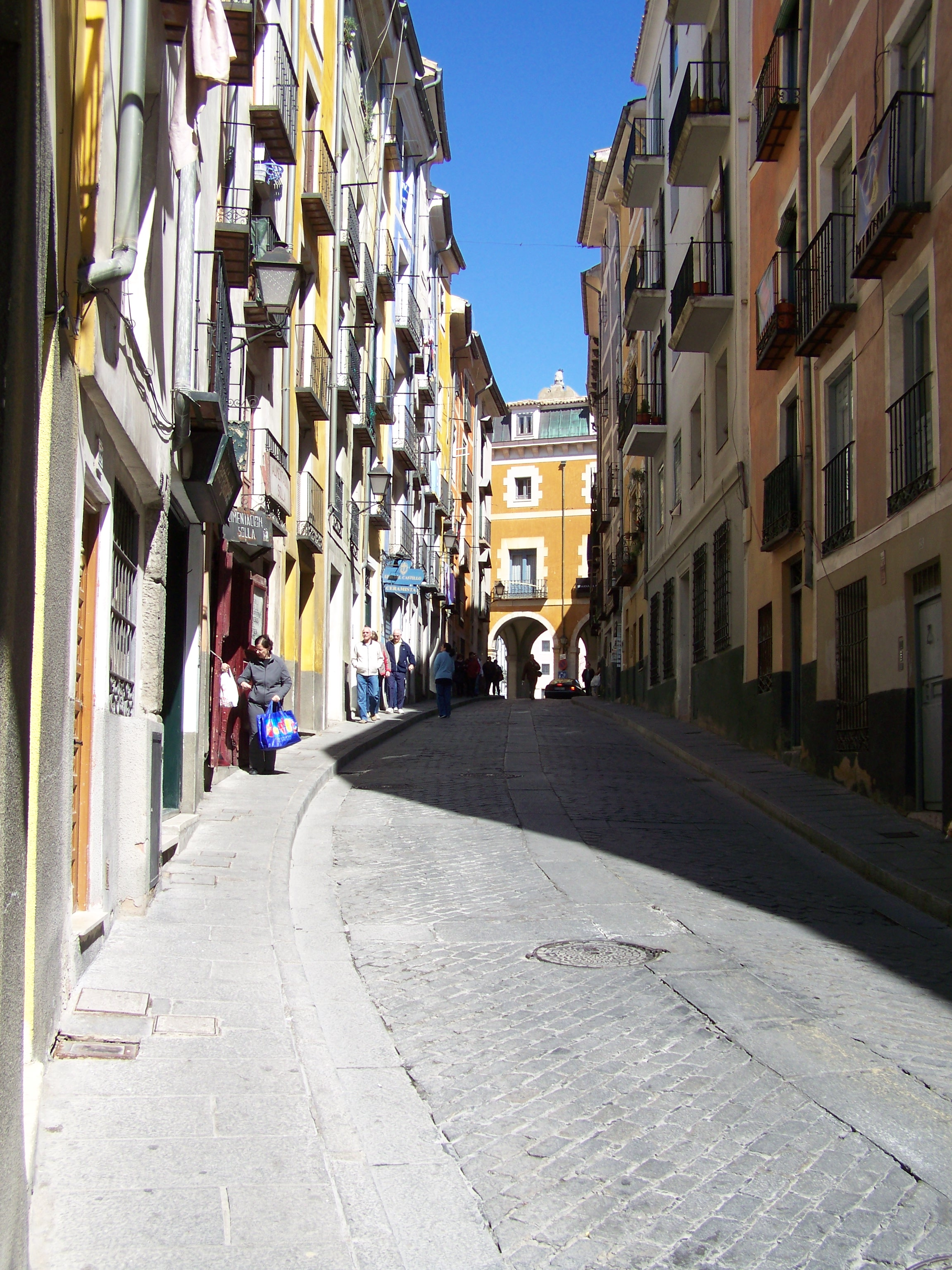
Alfonso VIII Street.

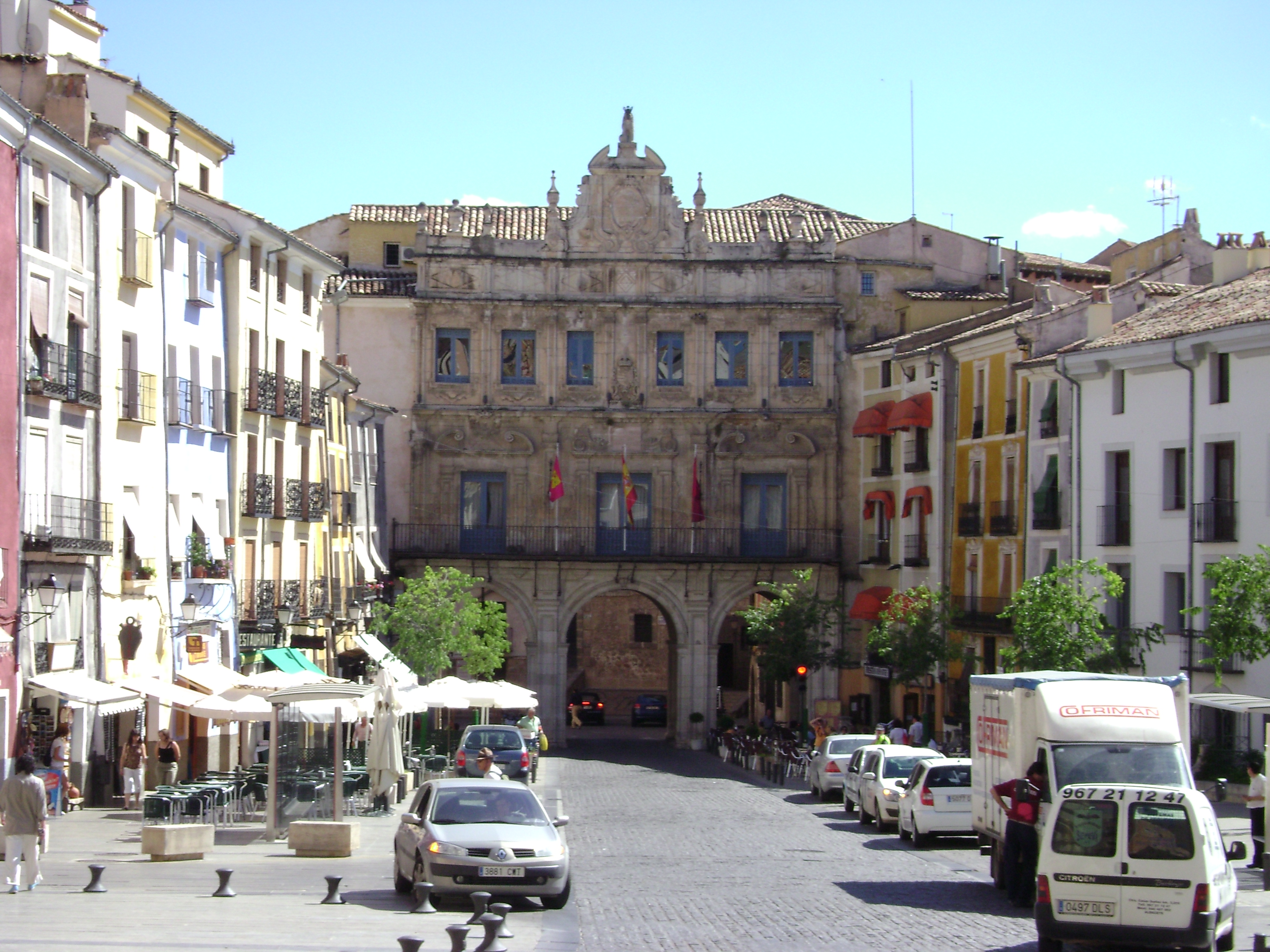
Plaza Mayor

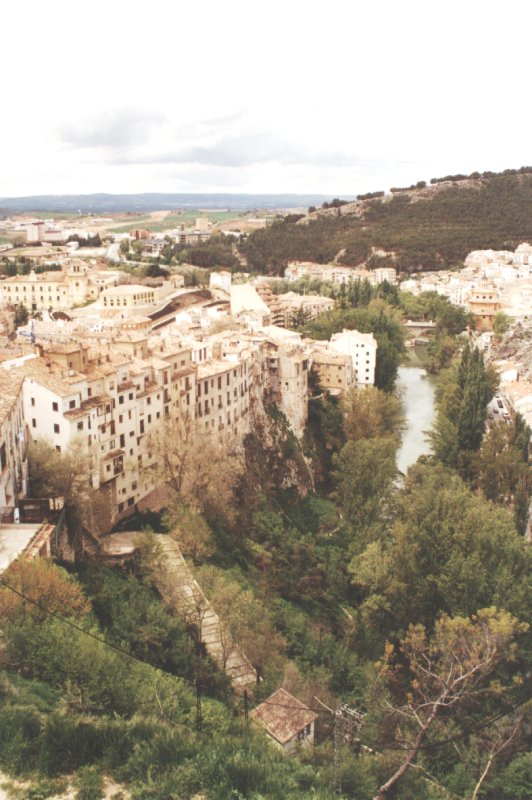
Júcar River flowing through Cuenca.

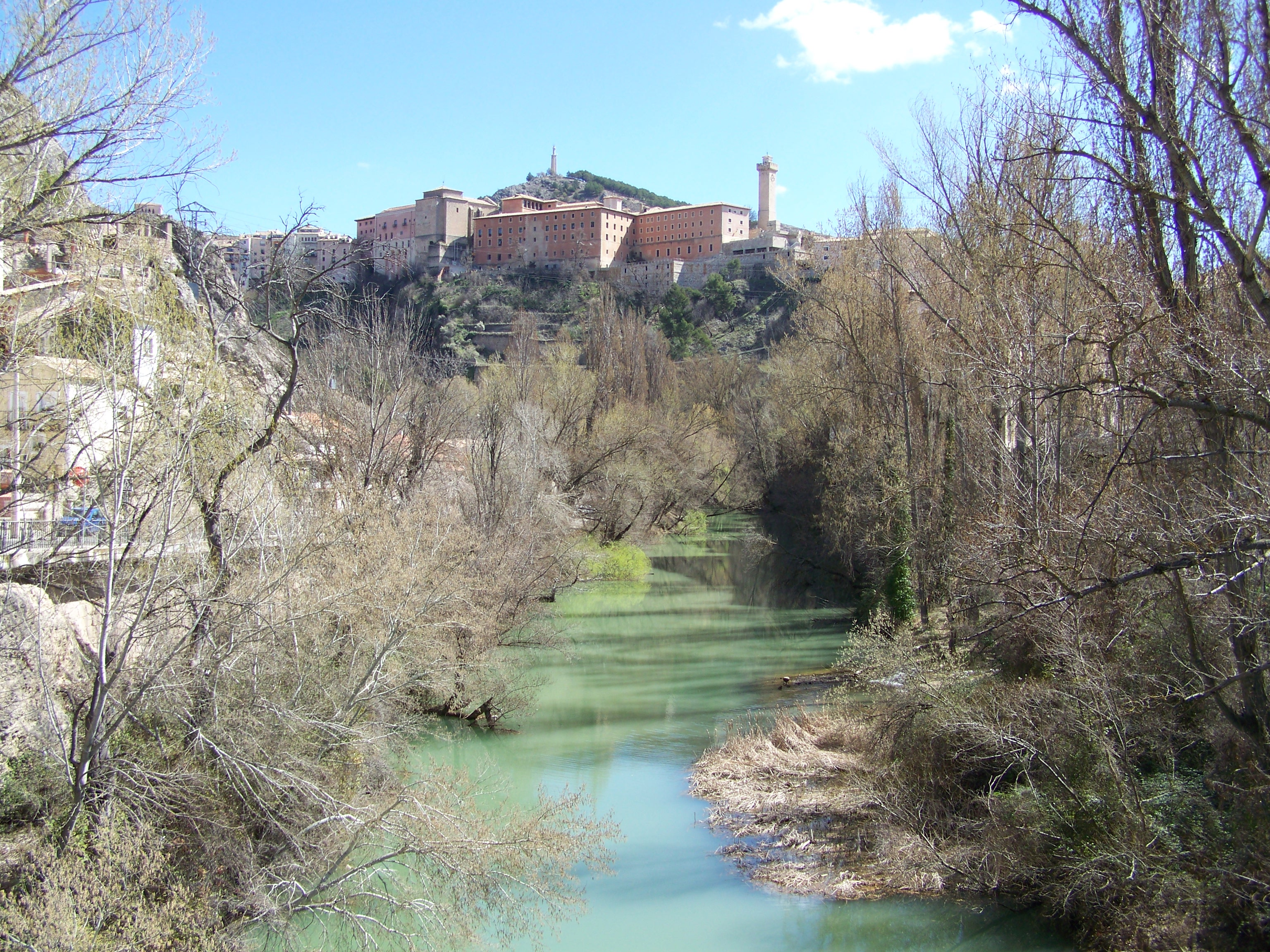
Río Júcar as seen from San Antón Bridge.

== See also ==
- Ciudad Encantada in Cuenca.
- The Valley of Gwangi: The final scenes of this 1969 American western fantasy film were shot in Plaza Mayor and also inside Cuenca Cathedral. Scenes were also filmed at the unusual rock formations of Ciudad Encantada near Cuenca, to depict the Forbidden Valley.
- Sound of the Sky, Japanese anime television series. The series is set in a fictional town named Seize, which is modelled after Cuenca and includes many of its notable landmarks.
