= Buenache de la Sierra =

- Flag Coat of arms

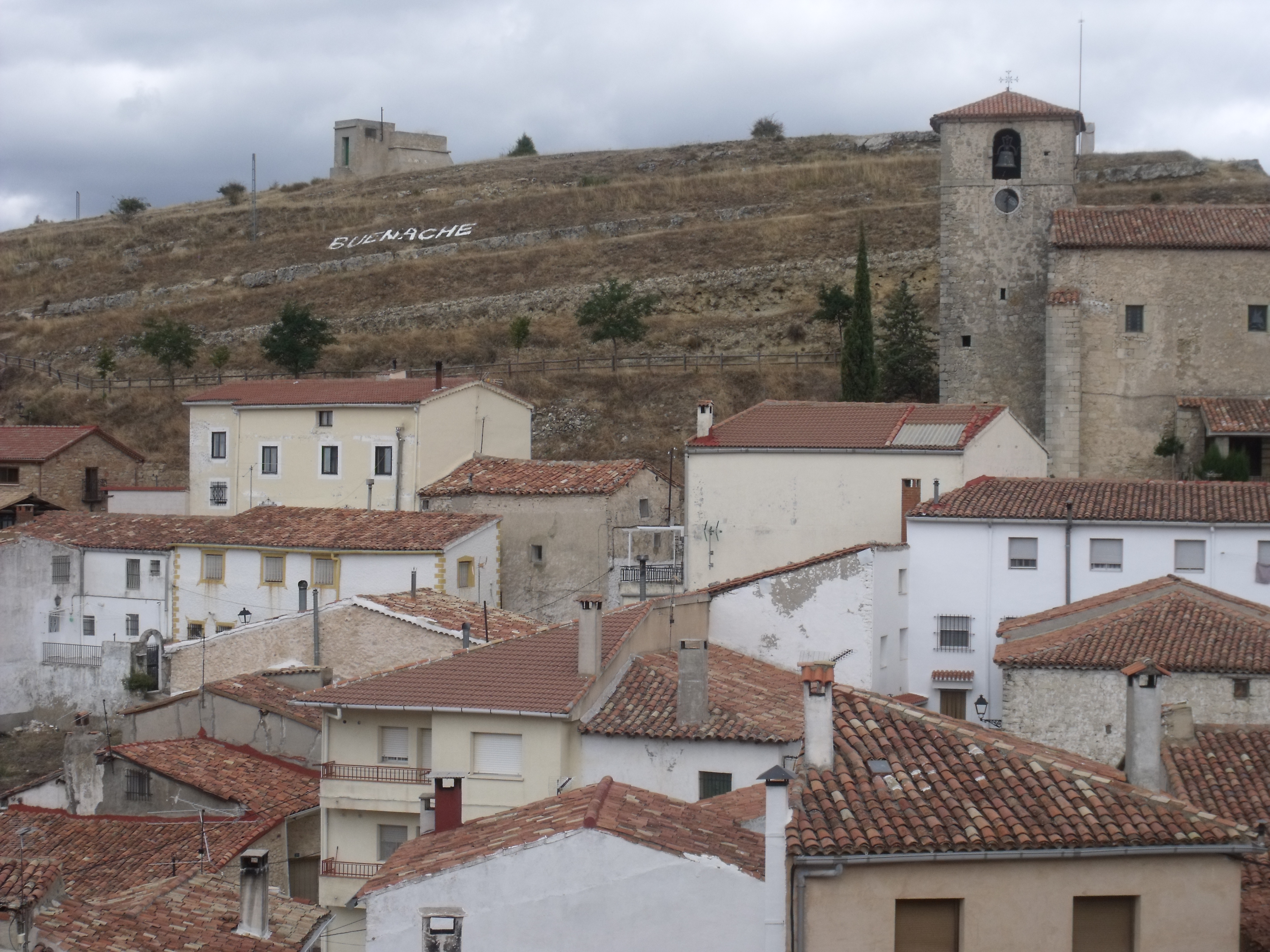

- Location within Spain
- Coordinates: 40°8′N 2°00′W
- Country: Spain
- Autonomous community: Castile-La Mancha
- Province: Cuenca
- Comarca: Serranía de Cuenca

Government
  - Mayor: Bruno Real Real

Area
  - Total: 57.48 km^{2} (22.19 sq mi)
- Elevation: 1,257 m (4,124 ft)

Population (2025-01-01)
  - Total: 112
  - Density: 1.95/km^{2} (5.05/sq mi)
- Time zone: UTC+1 (CET)
  - Summer (DST): UTC+2 (CEST)

Buenache de la Sierra is a municipality in the province of Cuenca, Castile-La Mancha, Spain. As of 2010, it has a population of 111.
