= Emmet =

Emmet may refer to:

== Places ==
=== Australia ===
- Emmet, Queensland

=== Germany ===
- Emmet (Upland), a mountain in Hesse

=== United States ===
- Emmet, Arkansas
- Emmet, Nebraska
- Emmet, North Dakota
- Emmet, South Dakota
- Emmet, Dodge County, Wisconsin, a town
- Emmet, Marathon County, Wisconsin, a town
- Emmet County, Iowa
- Emmet County, Michigan
- Emmet Township (disambiguation)

== People ==
=== Surname ===
- A. Maitland Emmet, entomologist and school teacher
- Christopher Temple Emmet, Irish barrister and poet
- Devereux Emmet, golf course architect
- Grenville T. Emmet, American attorney and diplomat
- Katherine Emmet (1878–1960), American actress
- Lydia Field Emmet, American artist
- Richard S. Emmet Jr. (1871–1897), New York assemblyman
- Robert Emmet, leader of the 1803 Irish rebellion
- Robert Temple Emmet, US Medal of Honor winner
- Thomas Addis Emmet, lawyer and politician
- Thomas Addis Emmet (bishop), American-born Roman Catholic bishop in Jamaica
- William Le Roy Emmet, electrical engineer

=== Given name ===
- Emmet Birk (1914–2000), American basketball player
- Emmet Bolton (born 1985), Gaelic footballer
- Emmet D. Boyle (1879–1926), American politician
- Emmet Byrne (1896–1974), American politician
- Emmet Byrne, Irish rugby union player
- Emmet Cohen (born 1990), American jazz pianist
- Emmet Crawford (1844–1886), American soldier
- Emmet Dalton (1898–1978), Irish soldier and film producer
- Emmet Densmore (1837–1911), American businessman and physician
- Emmet Flood, American attorney
- Emmet Fox (1886–1951), New Thought spiritual leader
- Emmet French, (1886–1947) American golfer
- Emmet Friars (born 1985), footballer
- Emmet Gowin (born 1941), American photographer
- Emmet Hayes (born 1951), American lobbyist and politician
- Emmet Heidrick (1876–1916), American baseball player
- Emmet John Hughes (1920–1982), American editor, speechwriter and author
- Emmet Kirwan, Irish actor, playwright and screenwriter
- Emmet Lanigan (1909–1989), Australian cricketer
- Emmet Lavery (1902–1986), American playwright and screenwriter
- Emmet G. Lavery Jr. (1927–2014), American producer and attorney
- Emmet Malone, Irish football correspondent
- Emmet McDermott (1911–2002), Australian dentist and politician
- Emmet McHardy (1904–1933), New Zealand missionary
- Emmet McLoughlin, amateur football player
- Emmet McNamara (born 1990), Irish jockey
- Emmet Nolan (born 1995), Irish hurler
- Emmet O'Brien (born 1981), Irish auto racing driver
- Emmet O'Neal (1853–1922), American politician and lawyer
- Emmet O'Neal (Kentucky politician) (1887–1967), American politician and ambassador
- Emmet M. Reily (1866–1954), American politician
- Emmet Sargeant, musician
- Emmet Stagg (1944), Irish politician
- Emmet Sullivan (sculptor), (1887–1970), American sculptor
- Emmet G. Sullivan (born 1947), American judge
- Emmet M. Walsh (1892–1968), American prelate
- Emmet Wan (born 1992), football midfielder

== Fictional characters ==
- Emmet Brickowski, the protagonist of The Lego Movie and its sequel The Lego Movie 2: The Second Part
- Emmet Cole, in ABC's The River
- Emmet Hawksworth, a character in the sitcom Keeping Up Appearances
- Emmet Lefebvre, a character in the American sitcom Top of the Heap
- Emmet Otter, the protagonist of Emmet Otter's Jug-Band Christmas
- Emmet Ray, the protagonist of Sweet and Lowdown

== Other uses ==
- Emmet, an archaic English word for ant
- Emmet (heraldry), the heraldic ant
- Emmet (Cornish), a nickname for tourists
- Emmet (software), a set of tools for HTML and CSS coders, formerly known as Zen Coding

== See also ==
- T. Emmet Clarie (1913–1997), American judge
- M. Emmet Walsh, (born 1935) American actor
- Emet (disambiguation)
- Emett
- Emmett (disambiguation)
