= Emmett =

Emmett may refer to:

== Places ==
In the United States

- Emmett, Idaho
- Emmett, Kansas
- Emmett, Michigan, a village in St. Clair County
- Emmett Charter Township, Michigan in Calhoun County
- Emmett Township, St. Clair County, Michigan
- Emmett, Missouri
- Emmett, Ohio
- Emmett, Texas
- Emmett, West Virginia

== Other uses ==
- Emmett (name)

== See also ==
- Emett
- Emmet (disambiguation)
- Emmitt, given name and surname
