= Dinosaur Park =

Sculpture park in Rapid City, South Dakota

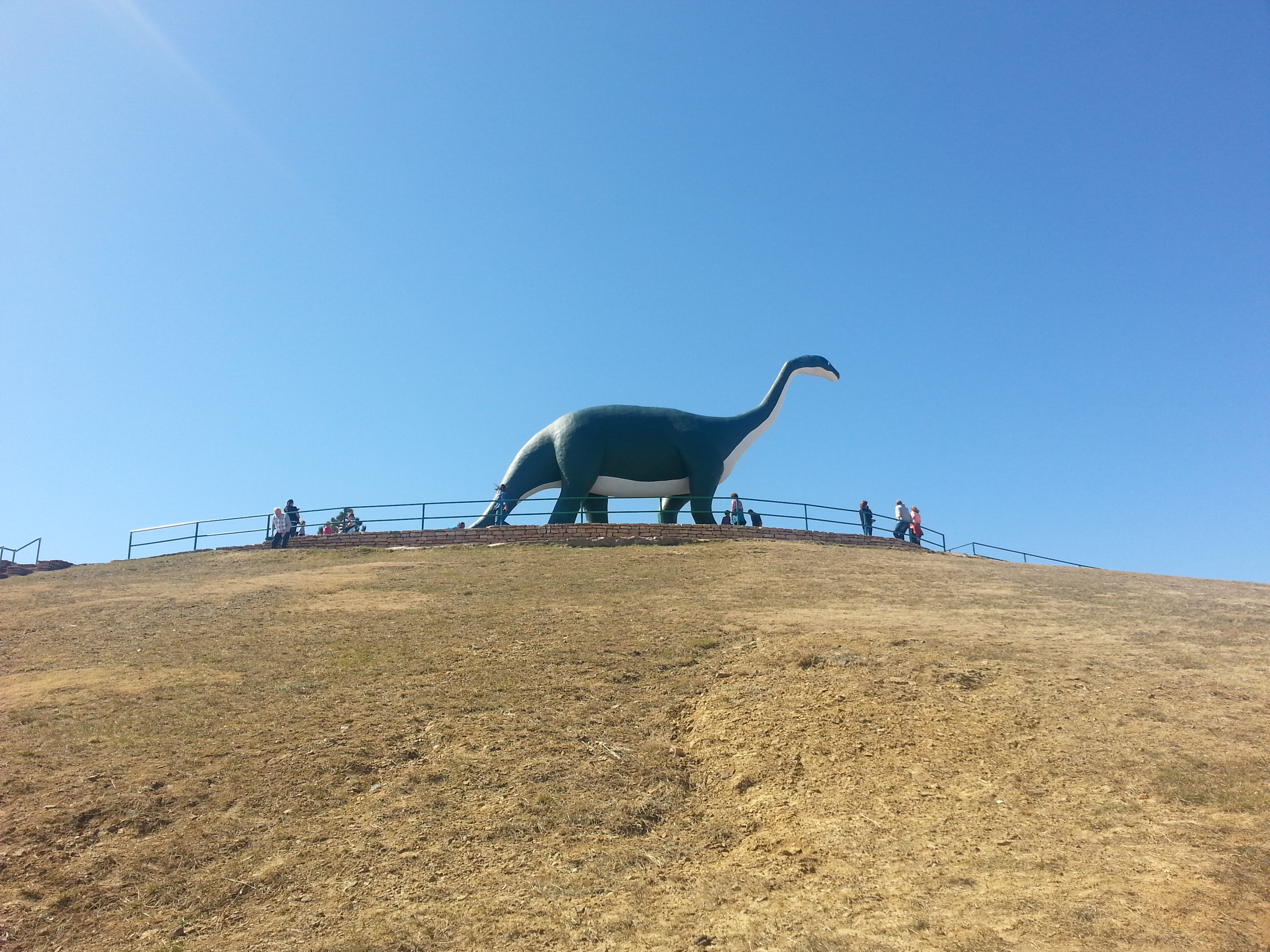
- Apatosaurus sculpture
- Interactive map of Dinosaur Park
- Type: Dinosaur park
- Location: 940 Skyline Dr., Rapid City, South Dakota, U.S.
- Coordinates: 44°4′40.6″N 103°14′45″W
- Designated: May 22, 1936
- Designer: Emmet Sullivan
- Operator: City of Rapid City
- Website: Official website
- Dinosaur Park
- U.S. National Register of Historic Places
- Architectural style: Vernacular
- NRHP reference No.: 90000956
- Added to NRHP: June 21, 1990

Dinosaur Park is a dinosaur park in Rapid City, South Dakota, United States. Dedicated on May 22, 1936, it contains seven dinosaur sculptures on a hill overlooking the city, created to capitalize on the tourists coming to the Black Hills to see Mount Rushmore. Constructed by the City of Rapid City and the Works Progress Administration, WPA Project #960's dinosaurs were designed by Emmet Sullivan. Sullivan also designed the Apatosaurus at Wall Drug nearby in Wall, South Dakota; the Christ of the Ozarks statue in Eureka Springs, Arkansas; and the dinosaurs at the now-closed Dinosaur World in Beaver, Arkansas.

The park is located at 940 Skyline Drive and is maintained by the City of Rapid City. Admission is free. The park was listed on the National Register of Historic Places on June 21, 1990. The City of Rapid City credits Dinosaur Park, which was built when Mount Rushmore was still being carved out, for beginning Rapid City's transformation into a major tourist destination as well.

== History ==
=== Background ===
In the 1920s and 1930s, Rapid City was looking to capitalize on the growing tourist traffic into the Black Hills, primarily at Mount Rushmore. Additionally, Rapid City was experiencing a population boom due to the establishment of nearby Ellsworth Air Force Base. The Great Depression added an extra incentive for the city to increase profits. Such a construction project would also allow the local government to apply for federal funding, as well as promote local jobs and commerce.

=== Development and construction ===
In 1935, the Rapid City Chamber of Commerce planned to build Dinosaur Park. Some sources credit South Dakota School of Mines and Technology paleontologist C. C. O'Harra for the idea; others suggest the idea was that of R. L. Bronson, secretary of the Chamber of Commerce, who had seen a mechanical Brontosaurus sculpture during a trip to Chicago. As prehistoric fossils had long been found in the Black Hills, a dinosaur-themed attraction seemed a natural choice. The park was dedicated on May 22, 1936.

Barnum Brown was the paleontological consultant and provided the descriptions and measurements for each replicated fossil; and Emmet Sullivan, who had previously designed other dinosaur parks, was hired as the chief sculptor and designer. Aided by the Works Progress Administration, who supplemented the costs and helped with engineering, construction began shortly after. As many as 25 workers were constructing the park at any given time. The Federal Emergency Relief Administration sponsored the construction of Skyline Drive, which would provide access to the park. Due to a dispute between Sullivan and the WPA over the dinosaur teeth—Sullivan retired from the project in 1937 and the new foreman disagreed with him over the installation method for the T. Rex sculpture's teeth—construction was not finished until 1938. In total, the park cost $25,000 to complete. The site also included a log gazebo, which has since disappeared. Additionally, fossilized dinosaur footprints that had been found in the area were planned to be moved to the park, but this apparently was never completed. Dinosaur Park, which was built in part to attract eventual Mount Rushmore tourists, is acknowledged to have begun Rapid City's transformation into a major tourist destination.

=== Later history ===
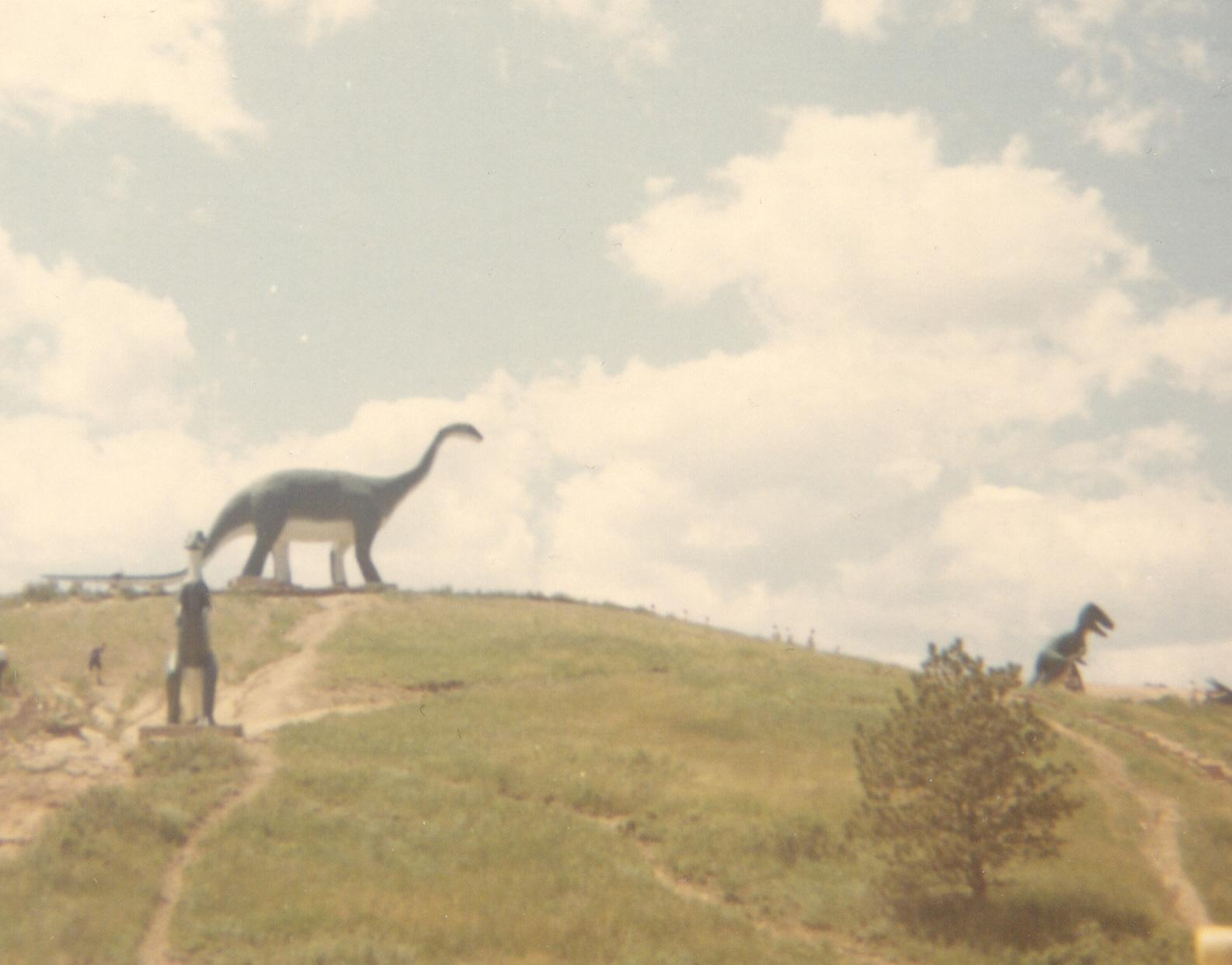
The park in 1967

Grants in the 1960s allowed the park to be updated. The city refurbished the sculptures, walkways, and landscaping, and added a larger parking lot and a new concession and gift shop. On June 21, 1990, the park was listed on the National Register of Historic Places. Only the original five sculptures were listed on the register.

The Rapid City Council approved a $3.5 million accessibility improvement project in March 2022. Work on the project began in the fall of 2022, with all work completed by August 2024.

== Dinosaurs and facilities ==
Dinosaurs represented in the park include Apatosaurus, Tyrannosaurus rex, Triceratops, Stegosaurus, and an Edmontosaurus annectens. A Protoceratops and a Dimetrodon were added later on and are located near the gift shop and parking lot. With the exception of the Protoceratops, the selected dinosaurs were based on fossils found in South Dakota and the Western United States.

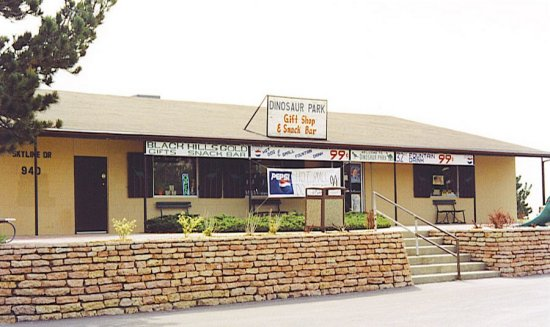
Gift shop

The dinosaurs were constructed out of 2-inch-wide (5.1 cm) black iron pipe under a wire mesh frame and a concrete skin. Being constructed in the 1930s, the dinosaurs reflect the thinking of the times. This includes dragging tails; three fingers on the T. rex as opposed to two; the dimensions; and the naming of the E. annectens sculpture as the now-outdated classification Trachodon. The largest sculpture is the Apatosaurus, which stands at 28 feet (8.5 m) high and 80 feet (24 m) long; it is visible from much of Rapid City. Originally, the dinosaurs were gray in color, but by the 1950s the statues had been painted bright green with white undersides.

The T. rex's original finger claws, as well as its teeth, have been lost or damaged over the years. Vintage postcards of the T. rex do in fact show these were originally part of the sculpture. The Stegosaurus also had a shorter tail with 4 correct tail spikes, but the tail spikes were removed and the tail itself considerably lengthened.

== Gallery ==
Apatosaurus

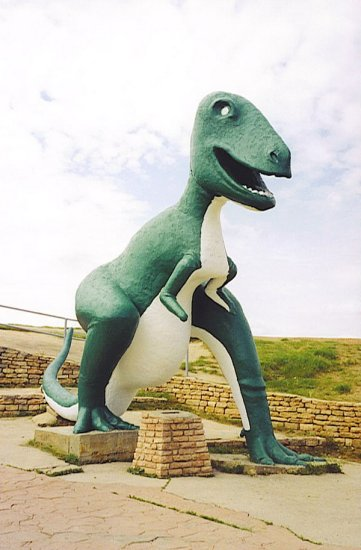
Tyrannosaurus rex

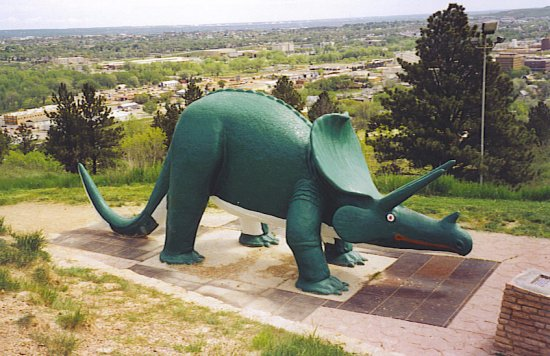
Triceratops

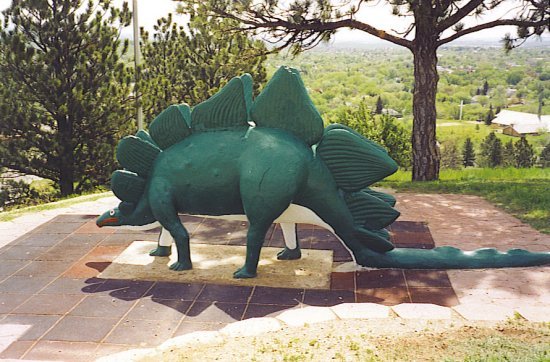
Stegosaurus

== In popular culture ==
Dinosaur Park is the subject of the song "Dinosaur Park" from Owl City's 2023 album Coco Moon.

== See also ==
- Dinosaur Gardens
