= Pismire =

Pismire can refer to:

- Pismire Island in Lake Michigan
- Archaic term for an ant
- The Emmet (or ant) in heraldry
