= Emmett (name) =

Emmett is a unisex given name primarily used for males, and is also used as a surname. It may be connected to the given name Emma, or the place of Emmott, Lancashire (now known as Laneshawbridge, but still containing Emmott Hall), or it is connected to the Hebrew word אמת (emét), "Truth", or old Persian word (امید), "Hope or Aspiration". It could, however, also come from the old English word for an ant, as still used in Cornwall.

People with this name include:

== Surname ==
- Arthur Emmett (judge), judge and lecturer in Roman law
- Chris Emmett, British actor
- Dan Emmett, American composer
- Dan W. Emmett, Californian politician
- Edward Nucella Emmett 19th-century Australian entrepreneur
- Evelyn Temple Emmett, Tasmanian
- Henry James Emmett 19th-century Tasmanian public servant
- Herbert Emmett, English footballer
- Josh Emmett, American mixed martial artist
- M. L. Emmett, poet
- Rik Emmett, musician, founding member of the Canadian rock band Triumph
- Robert Emmet, Irish Revolutionary
- Rowland Emett, English sculptor and cartoonist
- Sean Emmett, British Grand Prix motorcycle road racer
- Tom Emmett, English cricket player

== Given name ==
- Emmett Barrett (1916–2005), American football player
- Emmett Bowman (1885–1912), American Negro league baseball player
- Emmett Brown (born 2003), American football player
- Emmet Cohen (born 1990), American pianist (Jazz) and composer
- Emmett Dalton, member of the Dalton Gang
- Emmett Forrest, American pop culture collector
- Emmett J. Hull (1882–1957), American architect
- Emmett Johnson (born 2003), American football player
- Emmett Kelly (1898–1979), American circus performer, who created the clown figure "Weary Willie"
- Emmett King (1865–1953), American actor of stage and screen
- Emmett Leith, American scientist and electrical engineer
- Emmett McLoughlin, ex-priest, author of People's Padre, and housing activist in Phoenix, Arizona
- Emmett Morrison (1915–1993), American basketball player
- Emmett Mosley, American football player
- Emmett J. Scanlan, Irish actor who plays Brendan Brady in Channel 4 soap opera Hollyoaks
- Emmett Skilton, New Zealand actor
- Emmett Till, African-American youth whose lynching was a key event leading up to the American Civil Rights Movement

== Fictional ==
- Emmett, a mailbox from the TV show The Adventures of Timmy the Tooth
- Emmet, a Subway Boss from Pokémon
- Emmett Bledsoe, a character from Switched at Birth (TV series)
- Emmet Brickowski, a character in The Lego Movie franchise
- Dr. Emmett Brown, a character in the Back to the Future franchise
- Emmett Clark, a character from The Andy Griffith Show
- Emmett Clayton, a chess grandmaster and murderer in Columbo, season 2, episode 7, "The Most Dangerous Match"
- Emmett Cullen, a character from the Twilight series
- Emmett Graves, a protagonist from Starhawk (2012 video game)
- Emmett Honeycutt, a character in Queer as Folk (US version)
- Emmet Otter, the title character of Emmet Otter's Jug-Band Christmas
- Emmett Richmond, a character from the film Legally Blonde
- Emmett Forrest, a character from the play Legally Blonde (musical)
- Emmett Yawners, a deputy for the Banshee County Sheriff's Department from Banshee (TV series)

== See also ==
- Emmitt, given name and surname
