= Emmet Sullivan =

Emmet Sullivan could refer to:

- Emmet Sullivan (sculptor) (1887-1970), American sculptor
- Emmet G. Sullivan (born 1947), American judge
