= Baguam people =

Former Indigenous tribe in Texas

The Baguam people (also Bagnam, Pagaiam, Baguame, Bagname, Pagaiame) were a Native American people in the region of present-day Texas.

The Baguam lived on the Edwards Plateau, and were associated with the Bobole and Sana tribes.

In 1675, a group of Baguam travelled to Monclova to meet with Antonio Balcarcel, alcalde mayor of Coahuila. The last record of the Baguam is a 1684 document by Juan Domínguez de Mendoza, who encountered them at a trading fair near present-day Ballinger, Texas.
