= Hemet (disambiguation) =

Hemet is a city in California.

Hemet may also refer to:

- Hemet High School
- Hemet Unified School District
- Jane Hemet, birth name of Jane Lessingham (c.1738–1783), English actor
- Lake Hemet

== See also ==
- Emet
- Emett
