= EMET =

EMET or emet may refer to:

- Emet, a town in Turkey
- Emet Indians, a historical indigenous people from Texas
- Emet (geographic region), a territorial division within the Kalenjin society of pre-colonial Kenya
- Emet (One Piece), a fictional character from One Piece
- EMET Prize, an annual academic and cultural prize in Israel
- Endowment for Middle East Truth, a Washington, D.C., think tank focused on the Arab-Israeli conflict
- Enhanced Mitigation Experience Toolkit, a freeware security toolkit for Microsoft Windows

== See also ==
- Emeth, a character from The Chronicles of Narnia by C. S. Lewis
