= Benny (slang) =

Jersey Shore term for rude tourists

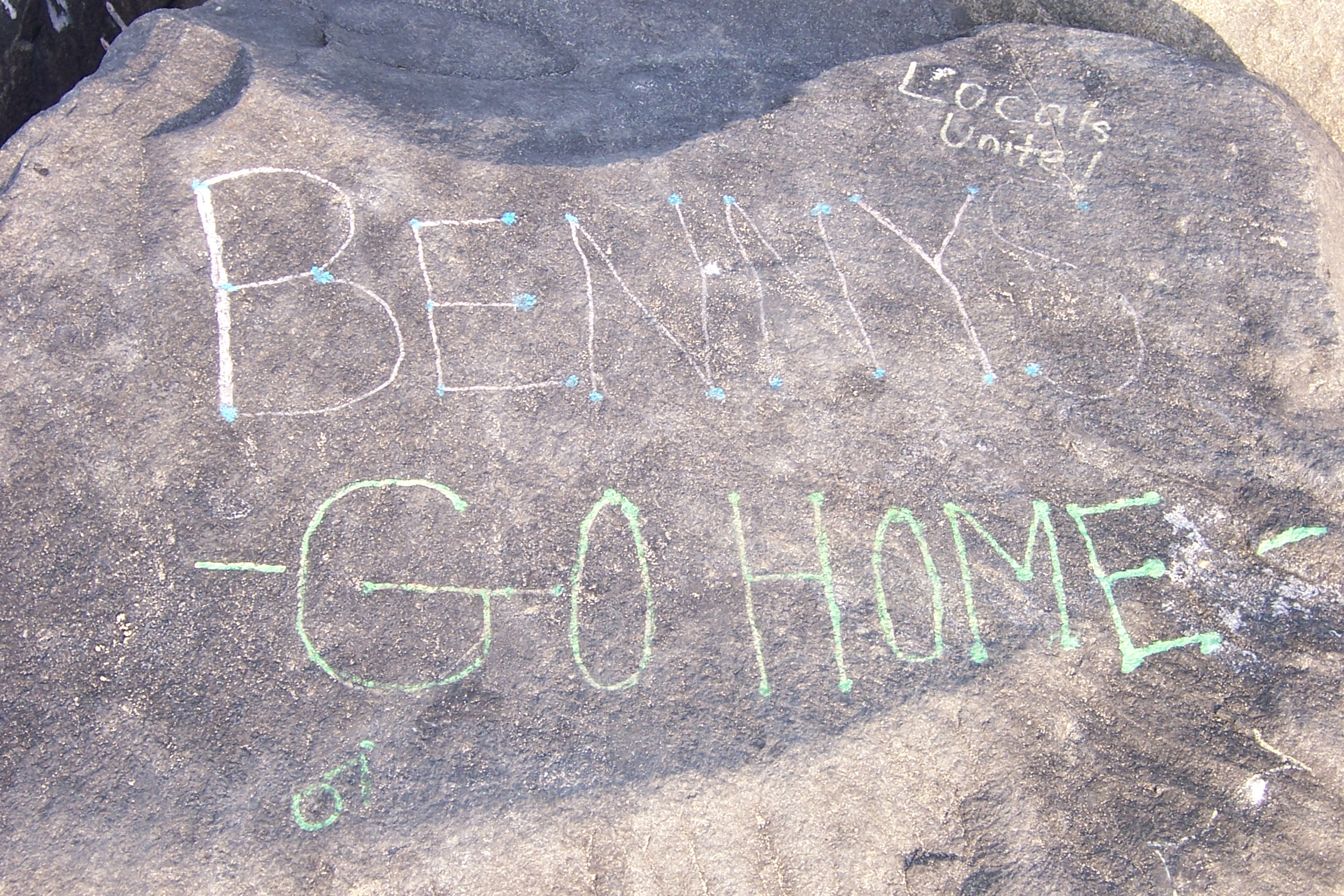
An anti-benny message scrawled on a rock at Manasquan Inlet, seen on Labor Day, 2007

Benny is a pejorative term used by year-round residents of the Jersey Shore to describe stereotypically rude, flashy, loud tourists from North Jersey and New York.

== Origin ==
The origin of the term is disputed. One common theory says the term originates from an acronym that was stamped on the beachgoers' train tickets, representing the city in which they boarded the train to the Jersey Shore: Bergen County, Essex County, Newark, and New York City. Locals often say it’s actually an acronym for the cities Bayonne, Elizabeth, Newark, and New York.

The term benny may also originate from the early 20th century practice of wealthy New Yorkers taking trips to the Jersey Shore as treatment for myriad maladies such as anemia, hemophilia, and hysteria. These therapeutic trips were called "beneficials" by doctors and patients. Often, visitors would claim to be at the Jersey Shore on a "beneficial", hence the term benny.

Benny also refers to Benjamin Franklin, whose picture is on the $100 bill, a reference to tourists and spending money. Another theory refers to off-shore boat racing during the 1970s sponsored by the Benihana restaurant chain.

The term shoobie is used by residents of resort communities in the southern New Jersey Shore, from Long Beach Island to Cape May. The term shoobie was originally used to describe day-trippers who took the train to the shore. The train offered pre-packed lunches that came in shoe boxes.

== See also ==
- Emmet (Cornish) – Nickname to refer to tourists who visit Cornwall
- Overtourism – Excessive number of tourists
- Shoobie – Type of tourist
- Touron – Pejorative for irresponsible tourists
