= Dinosaur World (Arkansas) =

Defunct theme park in Arkansas, United States

- Previously known as John Agar's Land of Kong
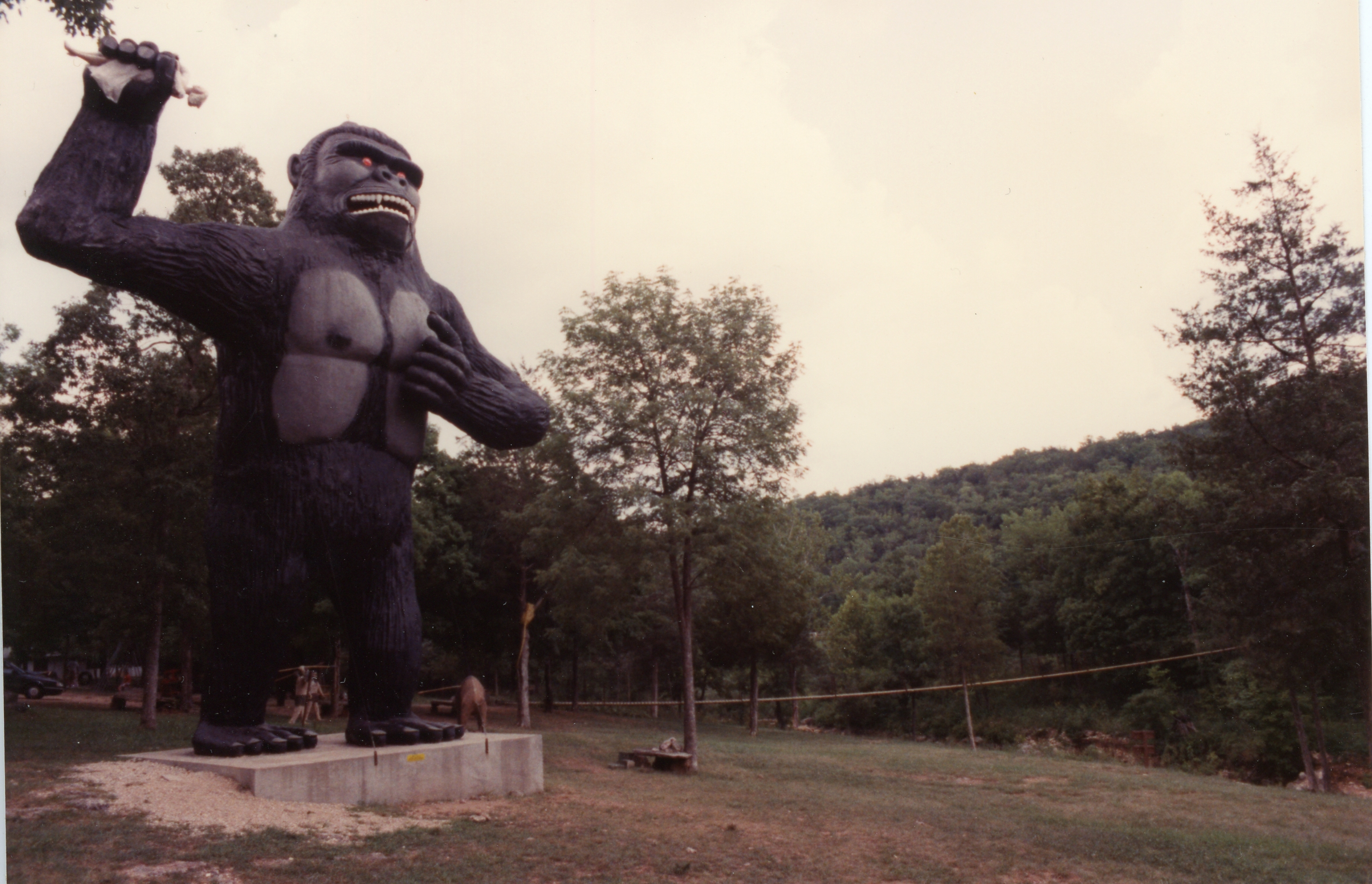
- A 40 feet (12 m) tall statue of King Kong holding a woman (1988).
- Interactive map of Dinosaur World
- Location: 8608 Highway 187, Beaver Dam Area, Arkansas
- Coordinates: 36.441965°N 93.842232°W
- Status: Defunct
- Opened: 1967
- Closed: 2005
- Area: 65 acres (26 ha)

Dinosaur World, earlier known as John Agar's Land of Kong and Farwell's Dinosaur Park, was a tourist attraction in Beaver, Arkansas. It was a theme park covering 65 acres (260,000 m^{2}), which contained a hundred life-size sculptures of dinosaurs, cavemen, and other prehistoric creatures as well as the world's largest Noah's Ark Mural painted by local artist Will Johnson. The park closed in 2005. At one time it was the largest dinosaur park in the world.

The park was started in 1967 when Ola Farwell hired Emmet Sullivan to build between six and ten life-size replicas of dinosaurs, and the park opened as "Farwell's Dinosaur Park". In the late 1970s the park was sold to Ken Childs and became "John Agar's Land of Kong", with a 40 feet (12 m) tall statue of King Kong, known as the "World's Largest King Kong", being built for it. The owner, a friend of film actor John Agar, received permission from Agar, who had appeared in the 1976 version of King Kong, to use his name in the name of the park. Many articles report that John Agar was either the owner or part-owner, but he was never either one.

Sculptor Emmet Sullivan also designed the dinosaur statues in Dinosaur Park and Wall Drug in South Dakota, and the Christ of the Ozarks statue in nearby Eureka Springs, Arkansas. Two local men, A. C. McBride and Orvis Parker handled the actual construction of the dinosaurs.

Along with the nearby Beaver Dam, a few of the park's dinosaurs are featured briefly during the opening scenes of the 1969 horror movie 'It's Alive!'. The tyrannosaurus is featured in the 2005 film Elizabethtown and is shown on the film's cover.

== Gallery ==
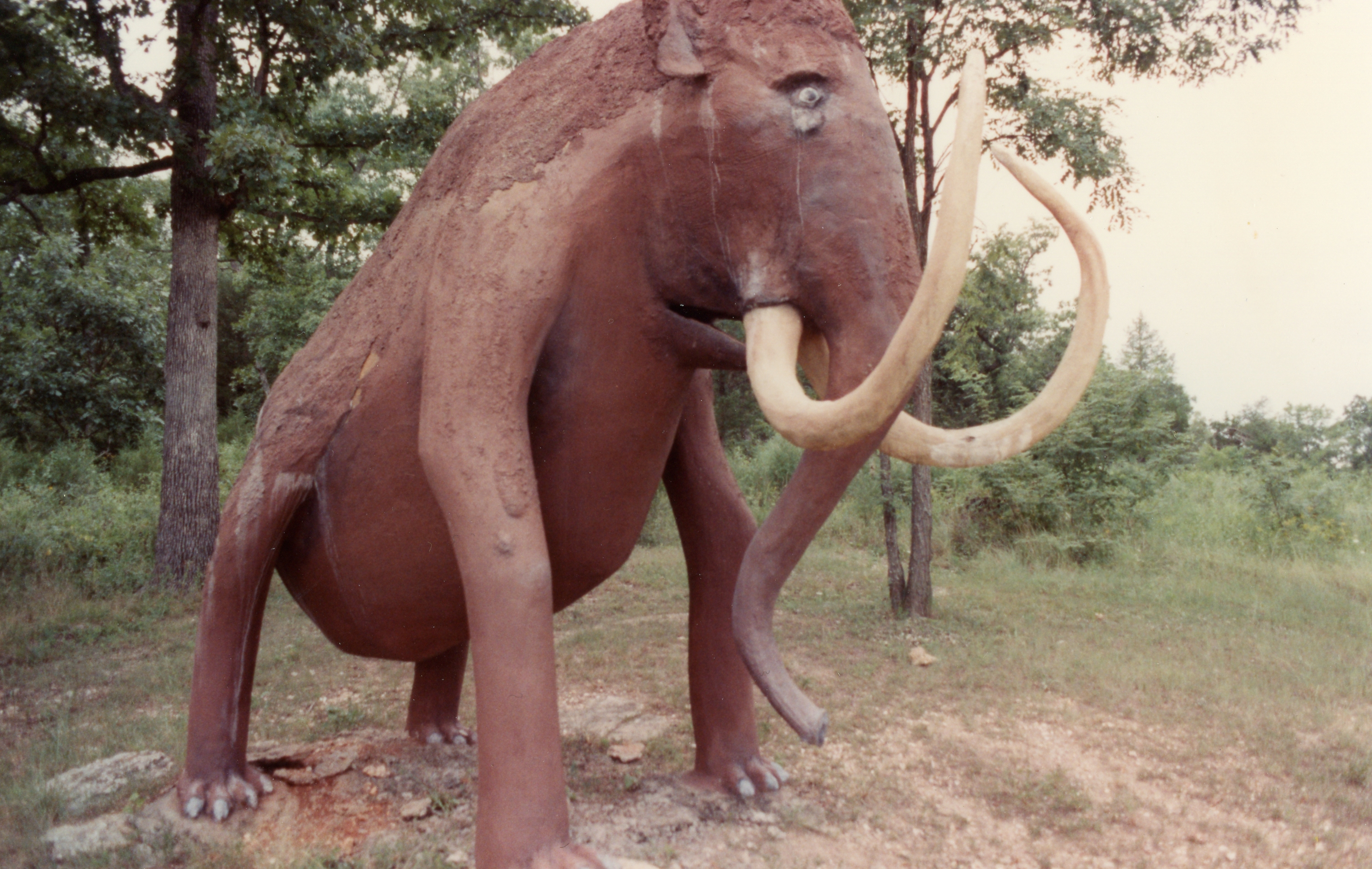
Woolly mammoth (1988)

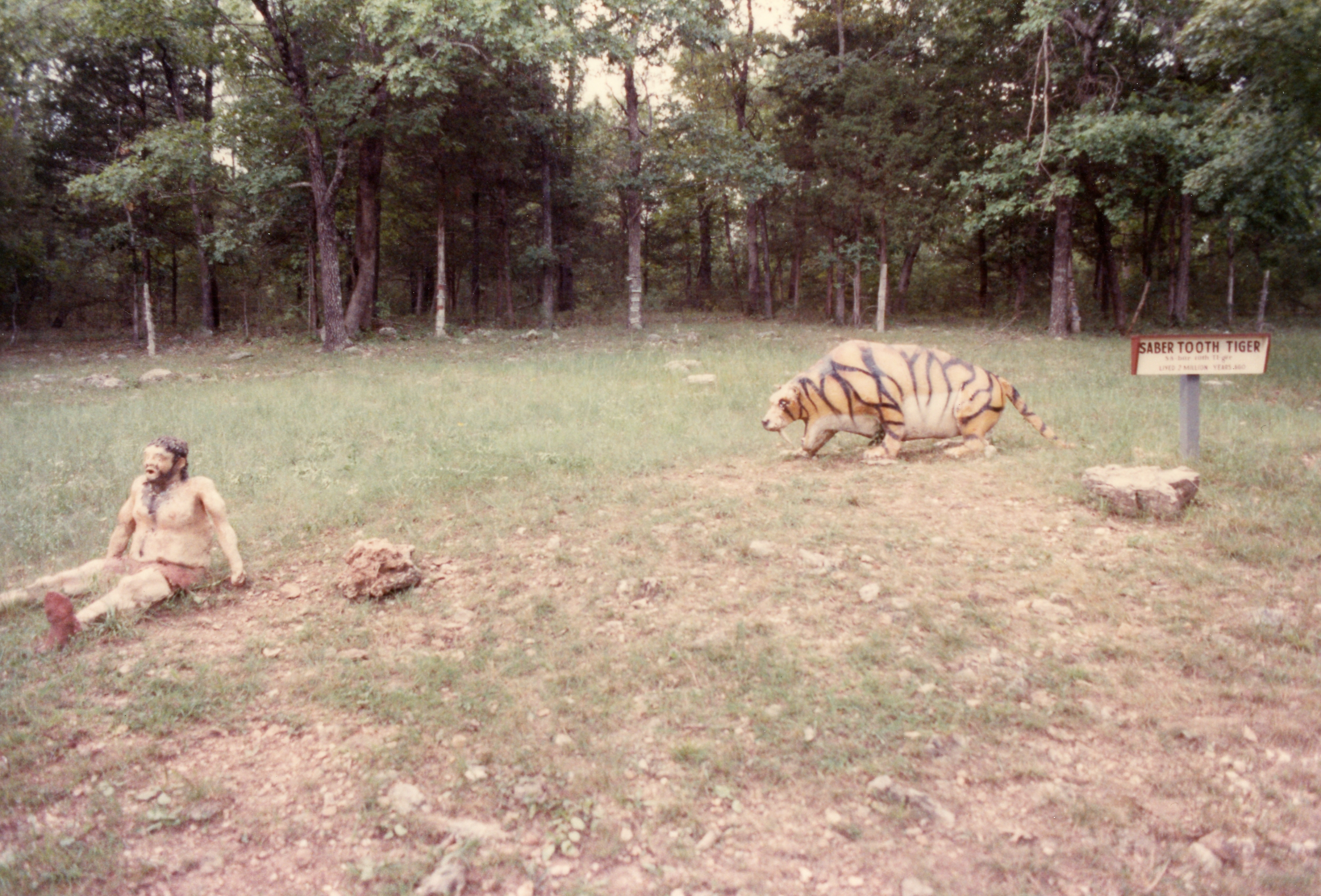
Caveman and a saber-toothed cat (1988)

== See also ==
- List of dinosaur parks
- List of defunct amusement parks
