= Shoobie =

Type of tourist

Shoobie is a New Jersey, Delaware, and Southern California slang term for a tourist who visits the seashore for a day (a daytripper) or summer-only residents. Shoobie is used in the Southern New Jersey coast (along with other parts of the east coast), and resort towns in California. The term is also used to describe daytrippers on Nantucket Island in Massachusetts. A similar term is benny, which is mostly used in the Monmouth County and northern Ocean County resort towns of the Jersey Shore.

== History ==
The term shoobie originated in the late 1800s, and it derives from daytrippers taking the train to the New Jersey beach, with their ticket price including a boxed lunch packed in a shoe box. Later it was used to refer to anyone who brought a picnic lunch to the beach resorts. Either way, these daytrippers deprived local businesses of the revenue the tourists would have spent on food. Homeowners (whether year-round or seasonal) often walk to the beach barefoot or remove their shoes immediately upon reaching the sand.

== Economic effects ==
Shoobies are essentially a mixed blessing for local beach residents. They bring in enormous revenue during the summer months (less so if they bring their own food), but at the same time they add numerous obstacles and annoyances to day-to-day life. In that sense, shoobies are not unlike the tourists who visit any resort area.

== In popular culture ==
The term has been used frequently on the Nickelodeon television show Rocket Power.

Slightly Stoopid and Toko Tasi recorded a song "Shoobie", which appears on Slightly Stoopid's EP entitled Slightly Not Stoned Enough to Eat Breakfast Yet Stoopid.

== See also ==
- Benny (slang) – Jersey Shore term for rude tourists
- Emmet (Cornish) – Nickname to refer to tourists who visit Cornwall
- Overtourism – Excessive number of tourists
- Touron – Pejorative for irresponsible tourists
