= Wall Drug =

Tourist attraction and shopping mall in Wall, South Dakota

Coordinates: 43.993231°N 102.241795°W

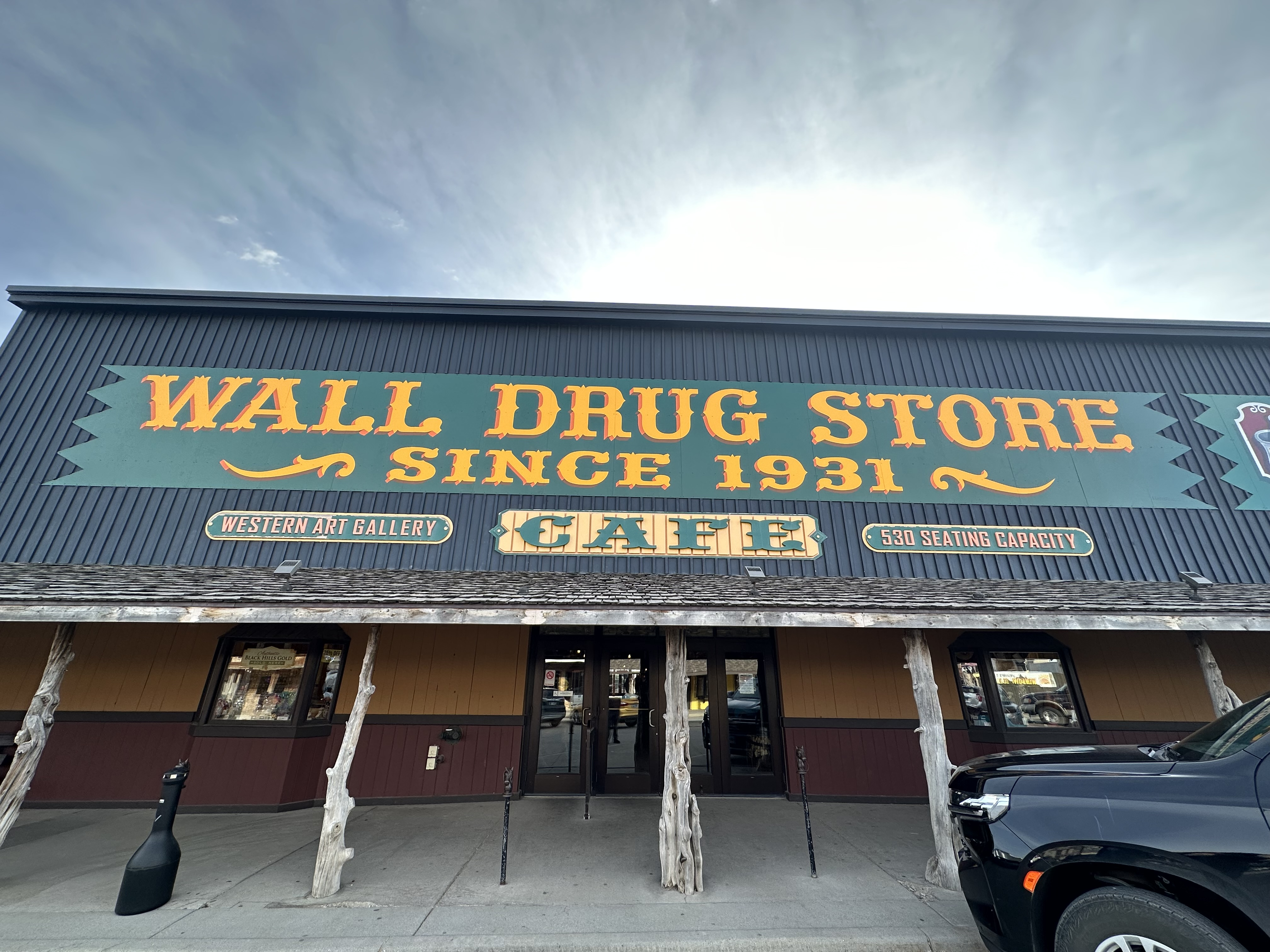
Wall Drug entrance

Wall Drug Store, often called simply Wall Drug, is a roadside attraction and tourist stop located in the town of Wall, South Dakota, United States, adjacent to Badlands National Park. Wall Drug consists of a collection of cowboy-themed stores, including a drug store, gift shop, several restaurants, and various other stores, as well as an art gallery and an 80-foot (24 m) brontosaurus sculpture.

Unlike a traditional shopping mall, all the stores at Wall Drug operate under a single entity rather than being run individually. The New York Times has described Wall Drug as "a sprawling tourist attraction of international renown [that] draws some two million annual visitors to a remote town".

== History ==
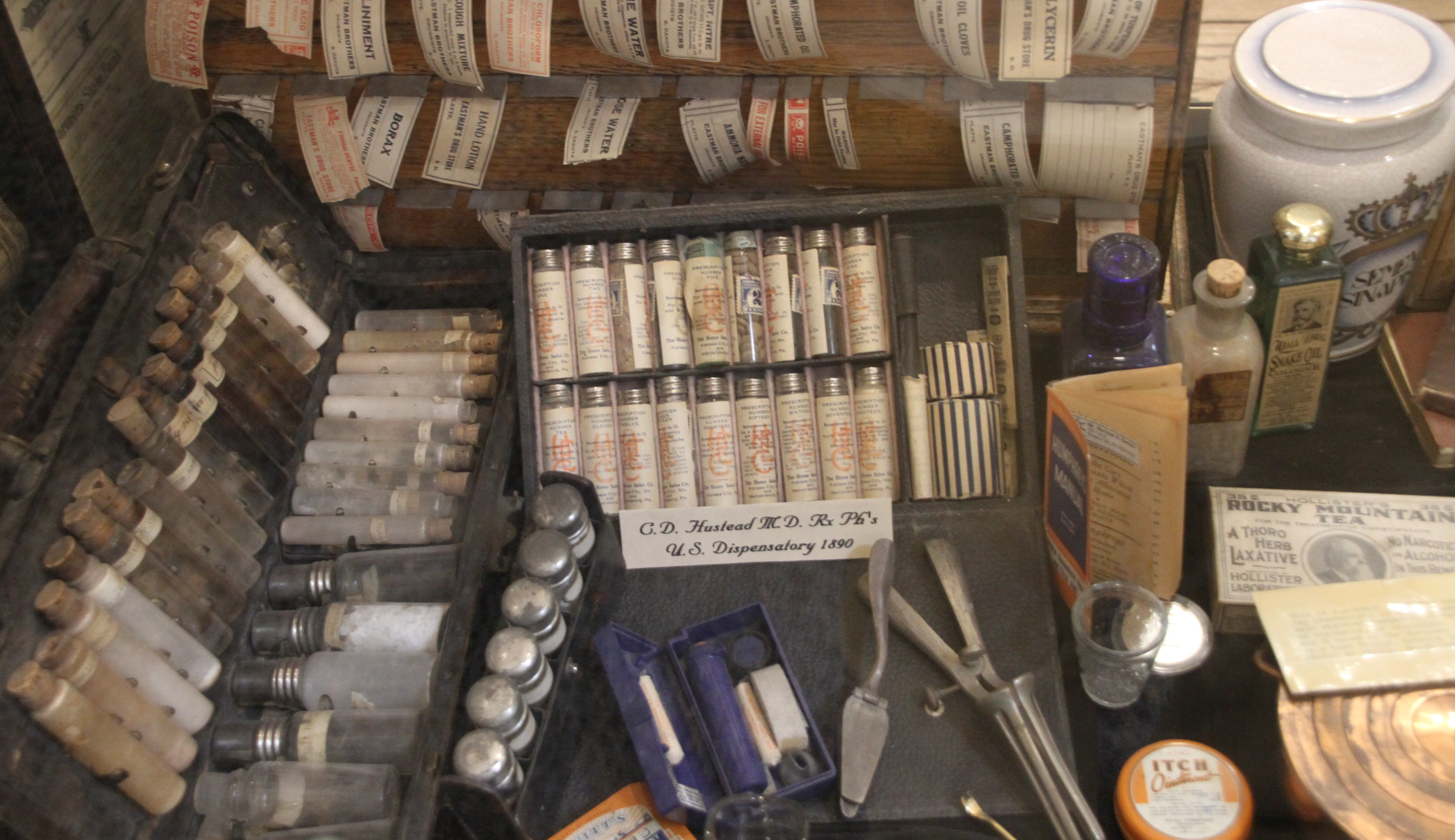
Wall Drug historic display, including items from Hustead's early practice

The small-town drugstore made its first step towards fame when it was purchased by Ted Hustead in 1931. Hustead was a Nebraska native and pharmacist who was looking for a small town with a Catholic church in which to establish his business. He bought Wall Drug, located in a 231-person town in what he referred to as "the middle of nowhere," and strove to make a living. Business was very slow until his wife, Dorothy, thought of advertising free ice water to thirsty travelers heading to the newly opened Mount Rushmore monument 60 miles (97 km) to the west. From that time on, business was brisk.

Ted's son, Bill Hustead, also a pharmacist, returned to Wall and joined the family business in 1951. Under his direction, Wall Drug grew into a cowboy-themed mall and department store. In addition, he created the Art Gallery Cafe, with a design inspired by Club "21" in New York City, one of his favorite restaurants. In addition, Wall Drug includes a western art museum, a chapel based on the one found at New Melleray Abbey near Dubuque, Iowa, another Bill Hustead creation, and an 80-foot (24 m) brontosaurus that can be seen right off Interstate 90. It was designed by Emmet Sullivan, who also created the dinosaurs at Dinosaur Park in Rapid City and Dinosaur World in Arkansas.

Bill Hustead had seven children, and his oldest child, Rick Hustead, is the current proprietor of Wall Drug Store.

== Marketing campaign ==
Wall Drug earns much of its fame from its self-promotion. Billboards advertising the establishment can be seen for hundreds of miles throughout South Dakota and the neighboring states. In addition, many visitors of Wall Drug have erected signs throughout the world announcing the miles to Wall Drug from famous locations. One of the most iconic Wall Drug signs was that of the USS Permit, a nuclear-powered submarine. Crew members took a photo with a home-made Wall Drug sign showing that it was 5,604 miles away from Wall Drug and 400 feet below sea level. By 1981, Wall Drug was claiming it was giving away 20,000 cups of water per day during the peak tourist season, lasting from Memorial Day until Labor Day, and during the hottest days of the summer.

Most of Wall Drug's advertisement billboards can be found on an approximately 650-mile-long (1,050 km) stretch of Interstate 90 from Minnesota to Billings, Montana. The signs are created by South Dakota billboard artists, including Dobby Hansen and Barry Knutson of Philip.

== Today ==
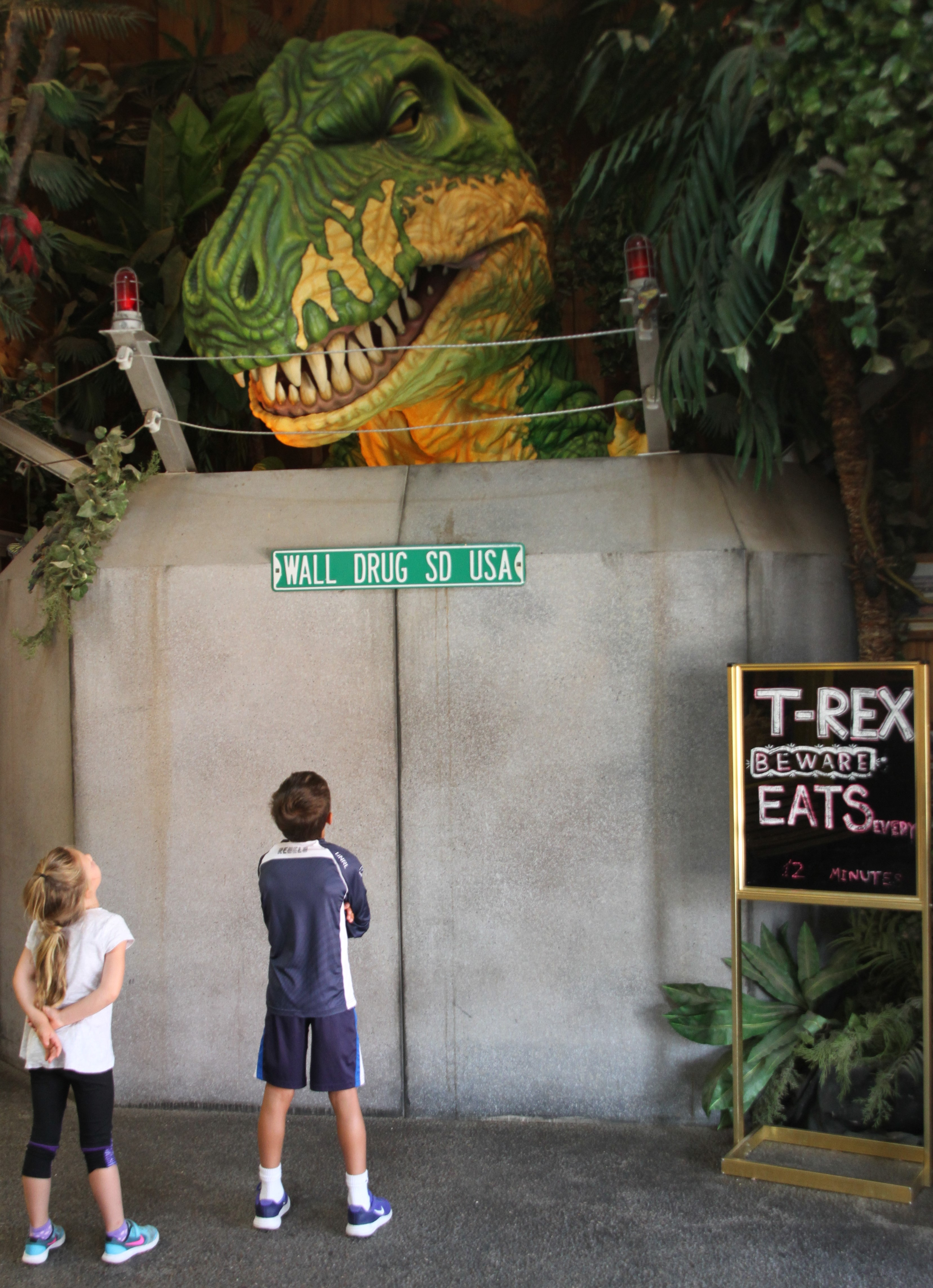
Animatronic Tyrannosaurus rex found in Wall Drug's Backyard building

To date, Wall Drug still offers free ice water, but as they have become more popular, they have started to offer free bumper stickers to aid in promotion, and coffee for 5 cents. Some popular free bumper stickers read "Where the heck is Wall Drug?" and "Have You Dug Wall Drug?".

Wall Drug has over 300 original oil paintings in the Western Art Gallery Dining Rooms. This acquisition represents one of the country's best private collections of original Western and Illustration Art. Artists featured include N. C. Wyeth, Harvey Dunn, Dean Cornwell, Louis Glanzman, and Harold Von Schmidt.

When the United States Air Force was still operating Minuteman missile silos in the western South Dakota plains, Wall Drug used to offer free coffee and doughnuts to service personnel if they stopped in on their way to or from Ellsworth Air Force Base (50 miles [80 km] west on Interstate 90). To this day, Wall Drug continues to offer coffee and doughnuts which are free to active military personnel and also popular among ordinary tourists.

Ted Hustead died in 1999. The following day, South Dakota Governor Bill Janklow began his annual State of the State address by commemorating Hustead as "a guy that figured out that free ice water could turn you into a phenomenal success in the middle of a semi-arid desert way out in the middle of someplace". Bill Hustead died later that same year.

=== Media references ===
- In 1981, Wall Drug was featured in Time magazine as one of the largest tourist attractions in the north.
- In his 1989 book, The Lost Continent, Bill Bryson wrote, "It's an awful place, one of the world's worst tourist traps, but I loved it and I won't have a word said against it."
- The history of Wall Drug was told in a two-episode story arc of the podcast The Radio Adventures of Dr. Floyd.
- In 2016, Z Nation featured Wall Drug in season 3, episode 8.
- The 2020 drama film Nomadland features scenes where the main characters work at Wall Drug and visit the dinosaur statue.

== Gallery ==
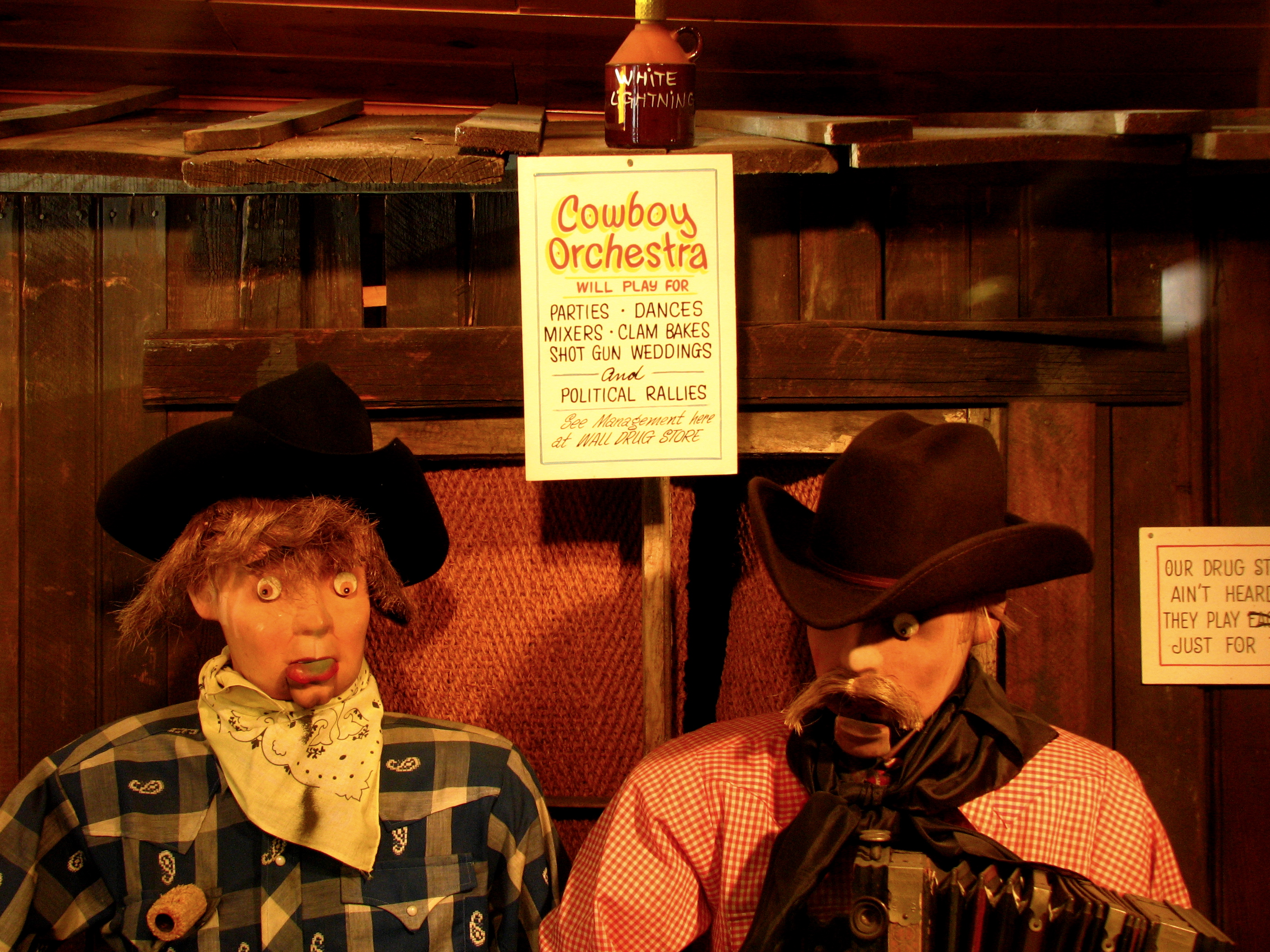
The Wall Drug Cowboy Orchestra

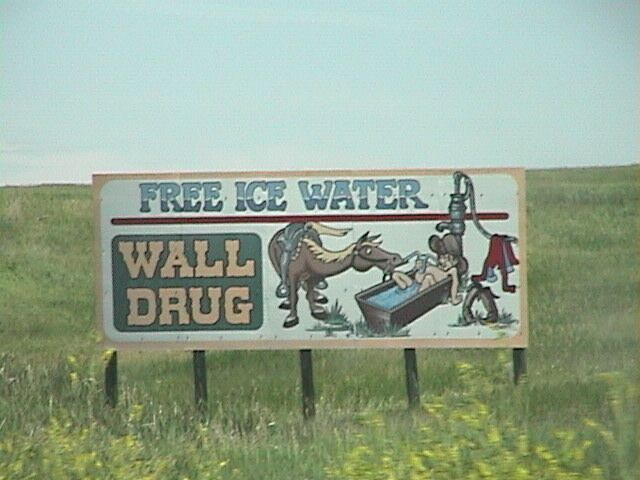
A typical Wall Drug billboard

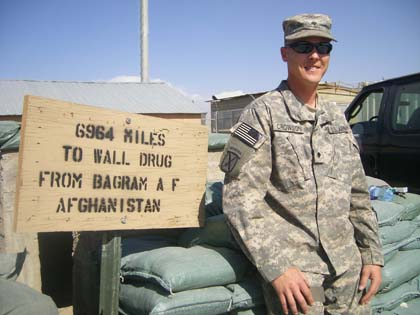
Sign in Afghanistan

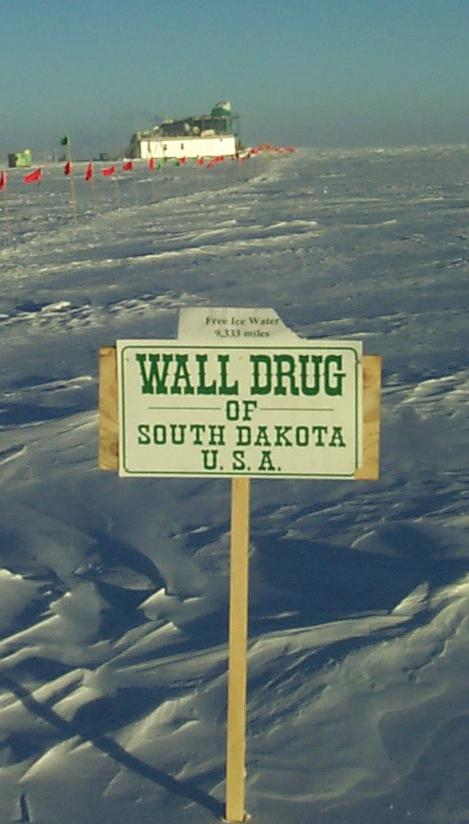
Wall Drug sign in Antarctica – Free Ice Water, 9,333 miles

== See also ==
- South of the Border, a similar attraction off Interstate 95 in South Carolina, just south of the border with North Carolina
- Iowa 80
- Badlands National Park
- Breezewood, Pennsylvania
- Uranus, Missouri
