= Emmett Township, Michigan =

Emmett Township is the name of some places in the U.S. state of Michigan:

- Emmett Charter Township, Michigan in Calhoun County
- Emmett Township, St. Clair County, Michigan

== See also ==
- Emmett, Michigan
- Emmet County, Michigan
- Emmet Township (disambiguation)
