= Touron =

Pejorative for irresponsible tourists

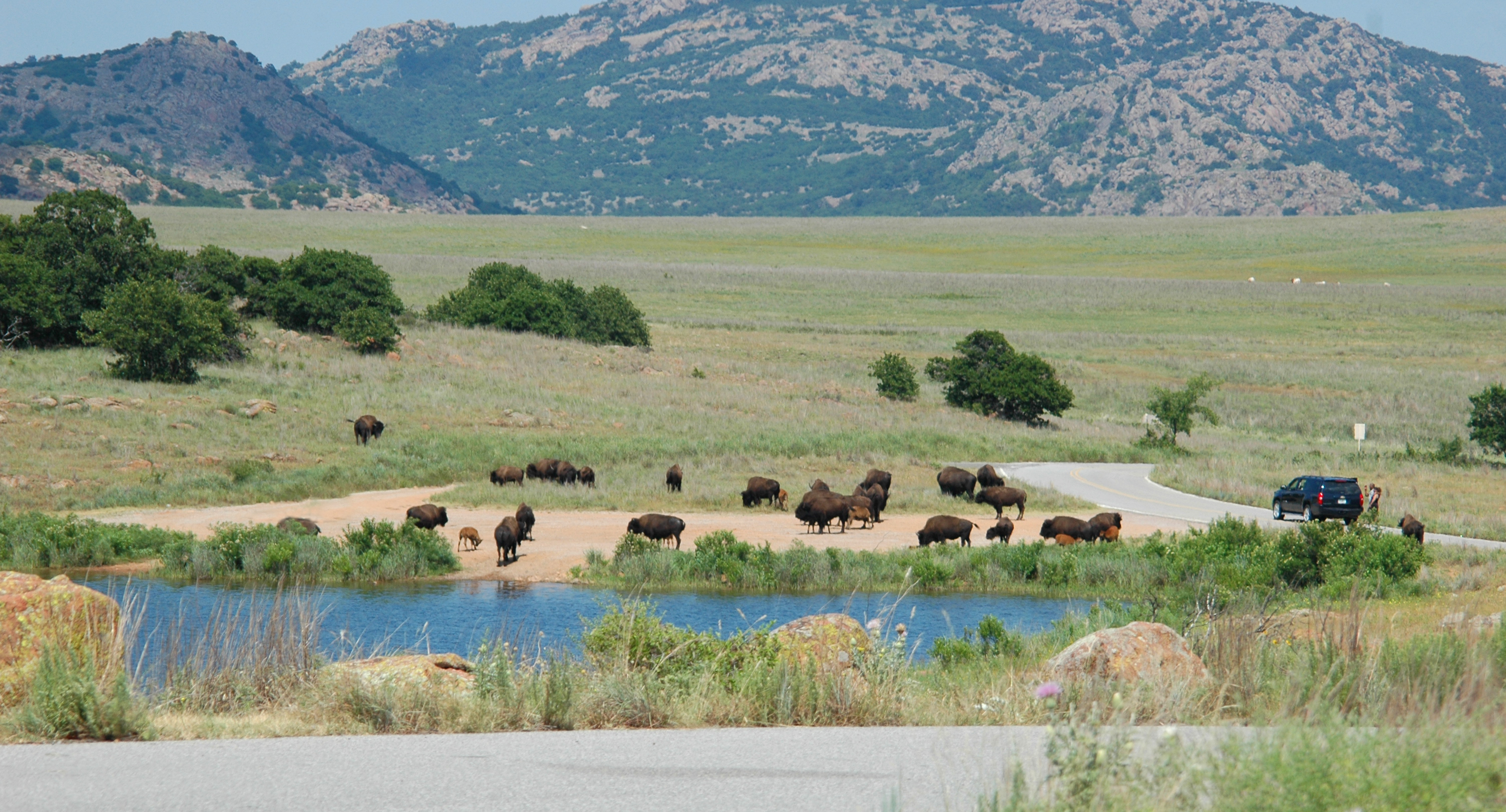
A tourist at an unsafe distance from bison

Touron is a pejorative blend word of "tourist" and "moron", describing one who commits an act of pure stupidity while on vacation. The term is considered park ranger slang that describes how some tourists act in national parks. The phrase indicates an act of ignorance and is known to be used in different subcultures. It is also used to describe tourists in general when they are outside their normal "comfort zone".

== Etymology ==
Early mentions of the term are "touron n. — A tourist, usually an annoying one. — "Say wha?", The Washington Post, September 20, 1987". In 1991 the term was cited in: "Over at U.S. 192 and State Road 535, westbound touron — (a combo of tourists and morons, according to a local dj) are constantly making sudden U-turns from the left lane, causing oodles of rear-end wrecks. — "The Road Toad," Orlando Sentinel, September 29, 1991". The U.S. National Park Service constantly warns park guests about the dangers of wildlife and the natural surroundings. Images and video of tourists in dangerous situations are uploaded to the Internet and demonstrate their, often stunning, behavior. Tourists acting as tourons can drive erratically. A common occurrence is to see vehicles stopped in the middle of the road at the first sighting of deer. Drivers and occupants leave the vehicle to take pictures, backing traffic up for miles. The term is used as humor to defend against the usual aggravation of continued exposure to tourists by even local residents of tourist areas.

The term has been frequently used to describe tourists who visit Horse Guards on London's Whitehall and act in an inexplicably stupid way. This behavior has been extensively documented on the popular YouTube channel, "London City Walks".

It has been argued that everyone is a touron outside their own home and away from familiar surroundings. Just being a traveler in a foreign location could make one a touron. Author Kelsey Timmerman believes that: "A touron is one part eager tourist and one part well-meaning moron. You yourself [sic] have likely been a touron at one time or another." Tourists become touronic out of an innocent reaction to places they have never been due to great curiosity.

== See also ==
- Benny (slang) – Jersey Shore term for rude tourists
- Emmet (Cornish) – Nickname to refer to tourists who visit Cornwall
- Overtourism – Excessive number of tourists
- Shoobie – Type of tourist
