= Emmett, Missouri =

Extinct hamlet in Missouri, U.S.

Coordinates: 37.326159°N 93.653259°W

Emmett is an extinct town in Dade County, in the U.S. state of Missouri.

Emmett was platted in 1881 when the railroad was extended to that point. A post office called Emmett was established in 1882, and remained in operation until 1904. The community was named after William Emmett Boyd, the son of the original owner of the town site.
