= Emet (geographic region) =

Emet (or Em) is a Kalenjin term for the largest recognized territorial division within the Kalenjin society of pre-colonial Kenya. The word emet in contemporary Kalenjin as used to denote a country derives from this term.

== Origin ==
Ehret posits that the emet territorial division of the Kalenjin is of ancient origin. From linguistic evidence, it seems probable that the Southern Nilotes, organised themselves into clans or at least different clusters of associated clans – what could be called tribes – which coincided with particular territories. These "tribes" and the territory they occupied were called *e:m.

== Function ==
The traditional Kalenjin geographic division, emet, primarily served as a territorial identity, it had limited military mobilization capacity and played no administrative functions.

== Current use ==
In contemporary Kalenjin lexicon, the word emet is used to mean country, e.g. emet'ab Kenya, where 'ab is 'of'.
