= Herbert Emmett =

English footballer

Personal information
- Full name: Herbert Emmett
- Place of birth: Rotherham, England
- Position: Wing half

Senior career*
Years	Team	Apps	(Gls)
1919–1920	Rotherham Town		
1920–1925	Rotherham County	141	(1)
1925–1927	Rotherham United	29	(0)
Total		170	(0)
- * Club domestic league appearances and goals

Herbert Emmett was an English footballer who played in the Football League for Rotherham County and Rotherham United.
