= Emmet Sullivan (sculptor) =

American sculptor

Emmet Sullivan (May 27, 1887 – November 3, 1970) was an American sculptor. He was born in Powder River, Montana, and claimed to have worked on Mount Rushmore. He created the five dinosaurs in Dinosaur Park in Rapid City, South Dakota in 1934, his first large-scale project. His other dinosaur creations were the Apatosaurus at Wall Drug in Wall, South Dakota in the late 1960s, and the many dinosaurs of Dinosaur World in Beaver, Arkansas. In 1966 Sullivan sculpted the 20-meter-tall (66 ft) Christ of the Ozarks statue in Eureka Springs, Arkansas.

Other projects of his career included a menagerie of prehistoric animals on West Main street in Rapid City, South Dakota in 1967, a giant seal for Marine Life, South of Rapid City, and a large bull at Black Hawk, South Dakota. Sullivan died at 83 in Rapid City in 1970. He was buried in the Black Hills National Cemetery.

== Gallery of sculptures by Emmet Sullivan ==
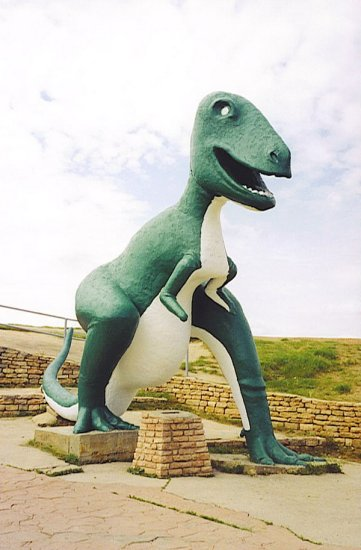
Tyrannosaurus rex sculpture in Dinosaur Park, Rapid City, South Dakota

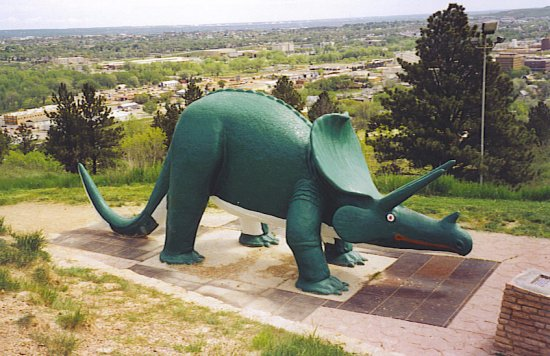
Triceratops sculpture in Dinosaur Park

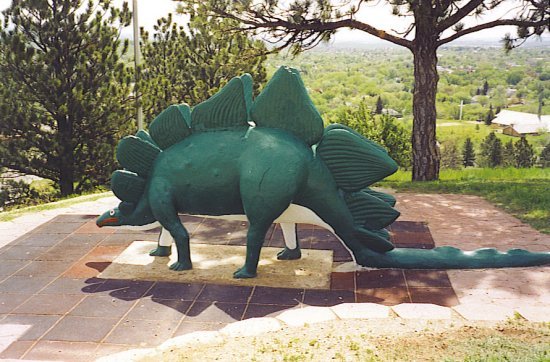
Stegosaurus sculpture in Dinosaur Park

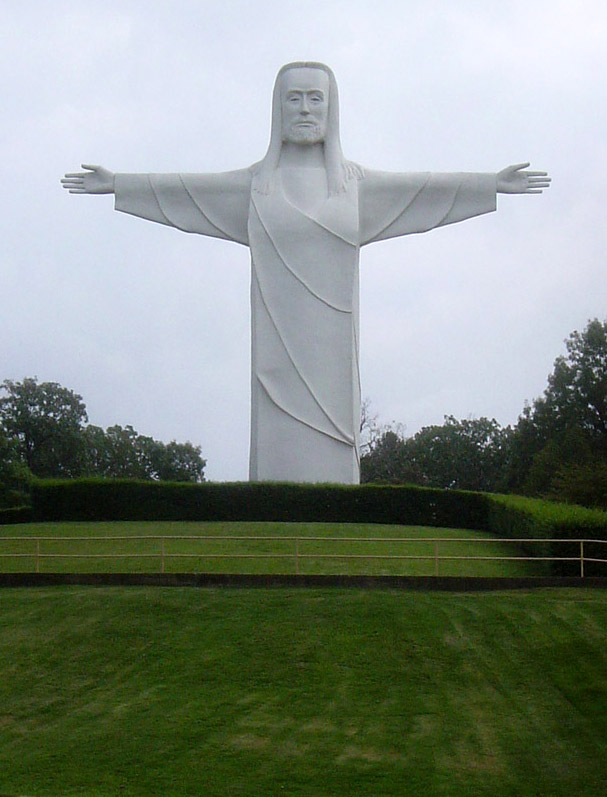
Christ of the Ozarks statue in Eureka Springs, Arkansas

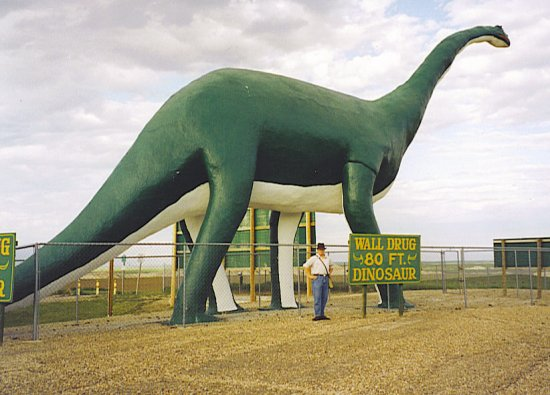
The Wall Drug dinosaur statue in Wall, South Dakota

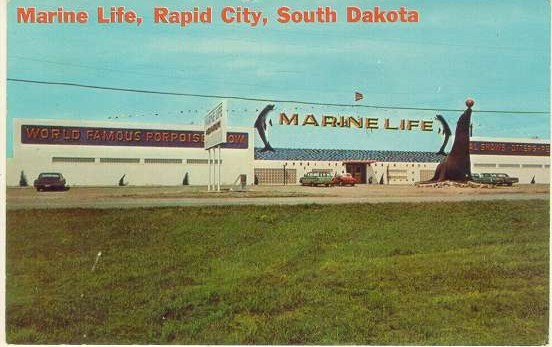
Seal sculpture at Marine Life Rapid City SD
