= Emmett, Ohio =

Unincorporated community in Ohio, U.S.

Coordinates: 41°13′49″N 84°33′14″W

Emmett is an unincorporated community in Paulding County, in the U.S. state of Ohio.

== History ==
A post office was established at Emmett in 1858, and remained in operation until 1905. With the construction of the railroad, business activity shifted to nearby Paulding, and the town's population dwindled.
