= Sana people =

Historical Indigenous people of Texas

Sana
Languages
- Tonkawa

Religion
- Catholicism

Related ethnic groups
- Cantona, Cava, Emet, Tohaha

The Sana were a Indigenous people of the Southern Plains from South Texas. They settled on both the Brazos and Guadalupe Rivers in the 17th and 18th centuries.

== History ==
During European colonization, their land was also shared with the Cantona, Cava, Emet and Tohaha Indians, and they were peaceful amongst themselves.

In the 1740s, the tribe established the San Antonio de Valero Mission, a Spanish Catholic mission, in San Antonio, living there until about 1793.

By the late 18th century, the Sana merged into the main Tonkawa tribe.

== Language ==
They likely spoke a Tonkawa language.

== Name ==
The Sana were also known as the Chana, Chane, Jana, Xanac, or Xana.
