= Emmet (Upland) =

Mountain in Landkreis Waldeck-Frankenberg, Hesse

Coordinates: 51°16′N 8°39′E

Highest point
- Elevation: 742.5 m (2,436 ft)

Geography
- Location: Landkreis Waldeck-Frankenberg, Hesse, Germany

Emmet is a mountain in Landkreis Waldeck-Frankenberg, Hesse, Germany.
