= Emet people =

Historical Indigenous people of Texas

Emet
Total population
- extinct in the 18th century

Regions with significant populations
- Coastal Texas

Religion
- Indigenous religion, Roman Catholicism

Related ethnic groups
- Sana people

The Emet (also spelled Emat, Emiti, and Ymette) were an Indigenous peoples group in what is now Texas. They primarily lived on the Gulf Coastal Plain between the Colorado River and the Guadalupe River and cohabited with other groups, such as the Sana. European explorers first wrote about them in the late 17th century, and they continued as a distinct tribe until at least the mid-18th century. They may have been related to the Karankawa or Tonkawa cultures, while Spanish explorers in the region reported that the tribes in the area spoke Caddoan and Spanish.

== History ==
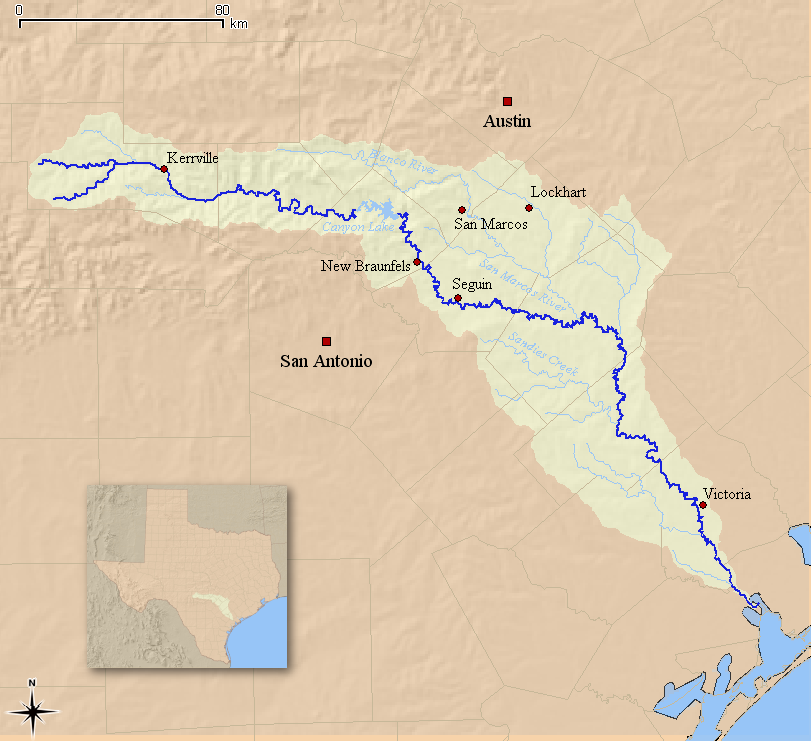
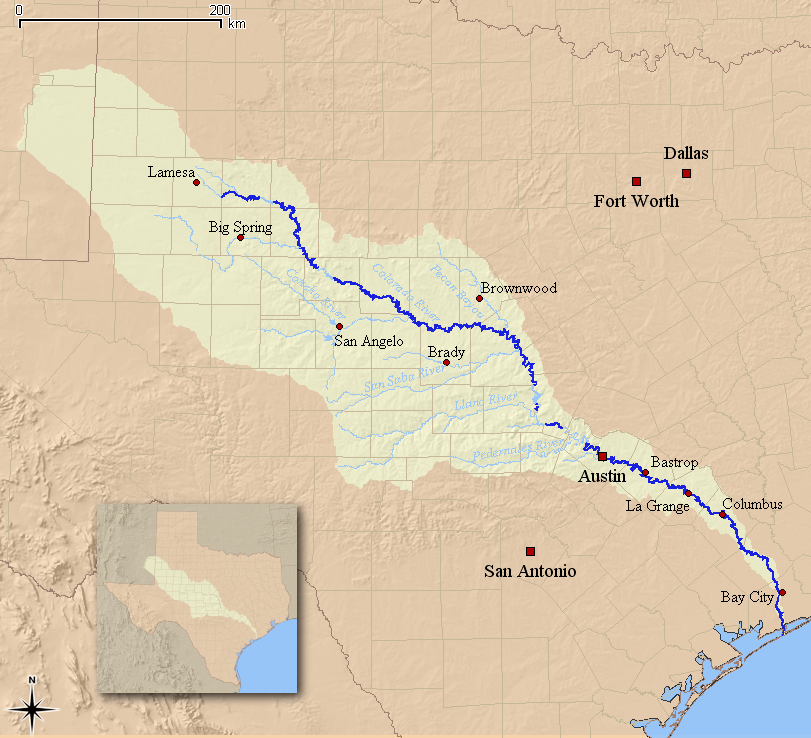
The Emet inhabited the Gulf Coastal Plain between the Guadalupe River (left) and the Colorado River.

=== 17th century ===
The Emet inhabited the Gulf Coastal Plain region of Texas, north of Matagorda Bay and between the Colorado River and the Guadalupe River. They are recorded as having inhabited the region since at least the late 17th century. In 1689, Spanish officials Alonso de León and Damián Massanet came into contact with a small Emet tribe near a crossing on the Guadalupe River, approximately 15 leagues away from the French settlement of Fort Saint-Louis on Matagorda Bay, in the modern-day counties of DeWitt and Lavaca. The Emet jointly inhabited this settlement with the Cava, another Indigenous group, and European explorers of the area noted that the Emet commonly occupied settlements with several other distinct Indigenous groups, such as the Cantona, Cava, Sana, Toho, and Tohaha. According to historian Edward Werner Heusinger, these tribes may have cooperated jointly for defensive purposes against the Apaches. Further north, de León and Massanet reported that the Emet inhabited several small ranches.

Within several years of this 1689 contact, Emet were observed to have migrated more to the east, closer to the Colorado River.

=== 18th century ===
In September 1718, during a Spanish expedition to East Texas led by Martín de Alarcón, the explorers came into contact with tribes of Curmicai, Emet, Hugugan, Sana, and Toho, near the Colorado River. They told the Spanish that their homelands were to the west of the river and that they were refugees from Apaches. From 1740 to 1750, some Emet relocated to the Spanish mission of San Antonio de Velaro in modern-day San Antonio. According to the Texas State Historical Association, Emet presence in the region was attested to until the mid-18th century. Concerning the Emet and related Indigenous groups, such as the Toho and the Tohaha, historian Gary Clayton Anderson says, "These coastal populations — never very large — suffered rapid decline after contact with Europeans".

== Language and culture ==
During the 1718 expedition led by de Alarcón, the tribes in the region, which included the Emet, were reported to have spoken both Caddoan and Spanish. According to historian William C. Foster, fellow historians Thomas H. Campbell and LeRoy Johnson believe that the Emet, along with other tribes in the region, such as the Cava, Manam, Mesquite, Sana, Sijame, and Toho, all spoke Sanan. Concerning the cultural groupings of the Emet, historians are largely divided between grouping them with the Karankawa culture and the Tonkawa culture, with a majority favoring the Tonkawa affiliation. Anthropologist and historian Frederick Webb Hodge, however, favored grouping them with the Karankawa.

== See also ==
- Native American tribes in Texas
- Spanish Texas

== Sources ==
- Anderson, Gary Clayton (1999). The Indian Southwest, 1580–1830: Ethnogenesis and Reinvention. Norman, Oklahoma: University of Oklahoma Press. ISBN 978-0-8061-3111-5. OCLC 44955156.
- Campbell, Thomas N. (July 1, 1995) [1976]. "Emet Indians". Handbook of Texas Online. Texas State Historical Association. Archived from the original on July 9, 2022.
- Carlisle, Jeffrey D. (March 12, 2021) [1952]. "Tonkawa Indians". Handbook of Texas Online. Texas State Historical Association. Archived from the original on March 1, 2025.
- Foster, William C. (2008). Historic Native Peoples of Texas. Foreword by Alston V. Thoms. Austin, Texas: University of Texas Press. ISBN 978-0-292-78191-7. OCLC 1444758547.
- Heusinger, Edward Werner (1936). Early Explorations and Mission Establishments in Texas. San Antonio: Naylor Company. OCLC 2691597.
- Hodge, Frederick Webb, ed. (1911). Handbook of American Indians North of Mexico. Bulletin 30. Bureau of American Ethnology, Smithsonian Institution. Washington, D.C.: United States Government Printing Office.
