= Emett =

Emett is a surname and occasional given name. Notable people with this name include:

- Josh Emett (born 1973), New Zealand chef
- Rowland Emett (1906–1990), English cartoonist and constructor of objects
- Emett Clay Choate (1891–1974), American lawyer and judge
- Geoffrey Emett Blackman (1903–1980), English professor

== See also ==
- Emmet (disambiguation)
- Emmett (disambiguation)
- Emet
