= Emmitt =

Emmitt is a given name and a surname. Notable people with the name include:

== Surname ==
- Drew Emmitt, American musician
- Herbert Emmitt, English footballer
- Jacob Emmitt, Wales international rugby league footballer
- John Emmitt (1825-1901), American farmer and politician
- Lionel Emmitt, Welsh rugby league footballer
- Robert A. Emmitt (1850-1937), American farmer and politician

== Given name ==
- Charles Emmitt Capps, American Christian preacher and teacher
- Emmitt Finnie (born 2005), Canadian ice hockey player
- Emmitt Ford, American politician
- Emmitt Perry Jr., birth name of Tyler Perry, American actor, filmmaker, and playwright
- Emmitt Peters (1940−2020), American hunter, trapper, and dog musher
- Emmitt Smith (born 1969), American football player
- Emmitt Thomas (born 1943), American football player and coach
- Emmitt Williams (born 1998), American basketball player
- Emmitt Littles (born 2012), American animator

== Fictional characters ==
- Emmitt Otterton, an otter in the animated movie Zootopia

== See also ==
- Emmett (name), given name and surname
