= Christ of the Ozarks =

Sculpture of Jesus Christ in Arkansas

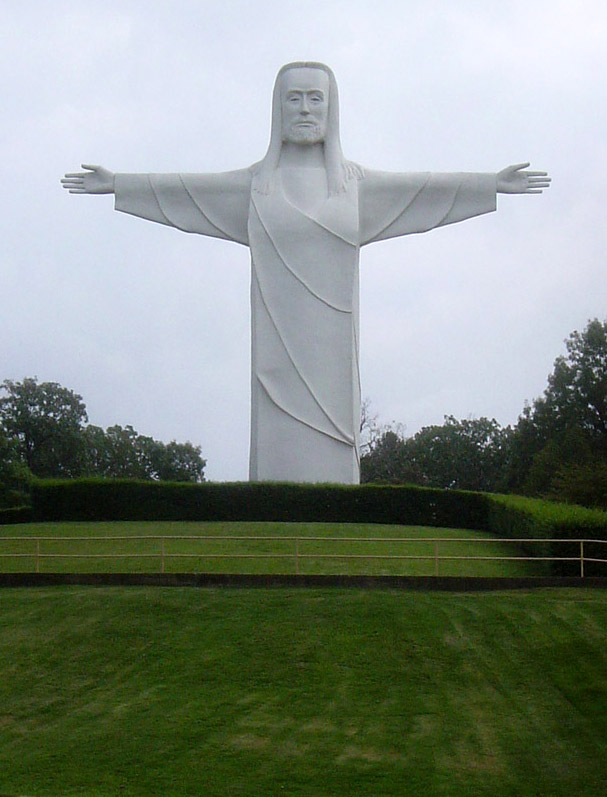
- Interactive map of Christ of the Ozarks
- Location: Eureka Springs, Arkansas, United States
- Coordinates: 36.409000°N 93.725268°W
- Type: statue
- Height: 20 metres (66 ft)
- Completion date: 1966
- Dedicated to: Jesus Christ

Christ of the Ozarks statue is a monumental sculpture of Jesus located near Eureka Springs, Arkansas, atop Magnetic Mountain. It was erected in 1966 as a "Sacred Project" by Gerald L. K. Smith. The statue stands 65.5 feet (20.0 meters) high.

== Background ==
During the Great Depression, Gerald L. K. Smith served as an organizer for Huey P. Long's Share Our Wealth movement and led it briefly following Long's assassination in 1935. After many years of highly controversial, religiously charged activism that was primarily characterized by Holocaust denial, virulent racism, antisemitism, and pro-Nazi sympathies, Smith retired to Eureka Springs, Arkansas, where he bought and renovated an old mansion. On other parts of the estate property, he planned a religious theme park, which he called "Sacred Projects". He commissioned the centerpiece, a gigantic statue of Jesus, completed in 1966. It is called Christ of the Ozarks.

He also completed a 4,100-seat amphitheater. This is the site of seasonal annual outdoor performances of The Great Passion Play. It is performed 3 nights a week from the last week of May through the end of October.

== Design ==
The statue was primarily the work of Emmet Sullivan, who also worked on nearby Dinosaur World. He had assisted in the work at Mount Rushmore. The statue is modernistic and minimalistic; there is little facial detail or expression, and the lines and forms are generally simplified. The arms are outstretched straight, sixty five feet from the tip of one finger to another, suggesting the Crucifixion; however the cross is not depicted.

It sits on 320 tons of concrete and was designed to withstand winds of 500 miles an hour. The statue, which was completely built by hand out of steel and mortar, is also reinforced in a way to withstand the force of a passing tornado.

It has been nicknamed "Gumby Jesus" and "Our Milk Carton with Arms" by critics.

== In popular culture ==
The Christ of the Ozarks is featured briefly in the 2005 movie Elizabethtown and in the 1988 movie Pass the Ammo. It is also featured during the intro theme to True Detective, Season 3, which was filmed in the Ozarks region of Arkansas. It is featured in a 2018 documentary The Gospel of Eureka. The art collective Indecline hung a banner on it in July 2021 that said "God Bless Abortions"; the banner was removed. It was also featured on The Daily Show in 2022 while discussing the topic of LGBT rights in Arkansas.

== See also ==
- List of statues of Jesus
- List of tallest statues
- List of the tallest statues in the United States
- Christ the Redeemer statue
