= Emmet Township =

Emmett Township may refer to one of the following places in the United States:

- Emmet Township, McDonough County, Illinois
- Emmet Township, Emmet County, Iowa
- Emmet Township, Renville County, Minnesota
- Emmet Township, Holt County, Nebraska
- Emmet Township, Union County, South Dakota

== See also ==
- Emmett Township (disambiguation)
