= Emmet (heraldry) =

Heraldic animal

Arms of Multia, Finland, a rare simple emmet (or ant) in heraldry

The emmet, also called the pismire, is an heraldic charge in European heraldry, particularly in English and German heraldry, representing historic names for the ant.

== Significance ==
The emmet is often understood as a symbol of hard work and of wisdom (but such symbolism is far from universally applicable in heraldry - for example, see also canting arms and the arms of Emmitt below). In his A Display of Heraldrie (1610), John Guillim of the English College of Arms says:

"By the Emmet or Pismire may be signified a Man of great Labour, Wisdom, and Providence in all his Affairs, and of a pregnant and ready Memory."

== Attitude ==
The emmet is often shown as tergiant, or with his back to the viewer, as seen from above.

== Examples ==
- Massy: argent a bend azure between three emmets sable
- Emmitt: sable two cross bones saltierwise between four emmets or on a chief engrailed erminois two bulls' heads azure

== Gallery ==
Arms of Ahja, in Estonia

Arms of Bjärtrå, in Sweden

Arms of Brekendorf, in Schleswig-Holstein, Germany

Arms of Fulleren, in Alsace, France

Arms of the commune of Saint-Maurice-sur-Moselle, France

Arms of Sewen, France

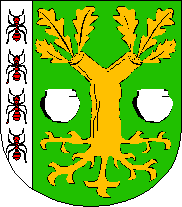
Arms of Marwice, Poland

Arms of Zeschdorf, in Brandenburg, Germany
