= Wall, South Dakota =

Wall, South Dakota Makȟóšiča Aglágla Otȟuŋwahe
- City
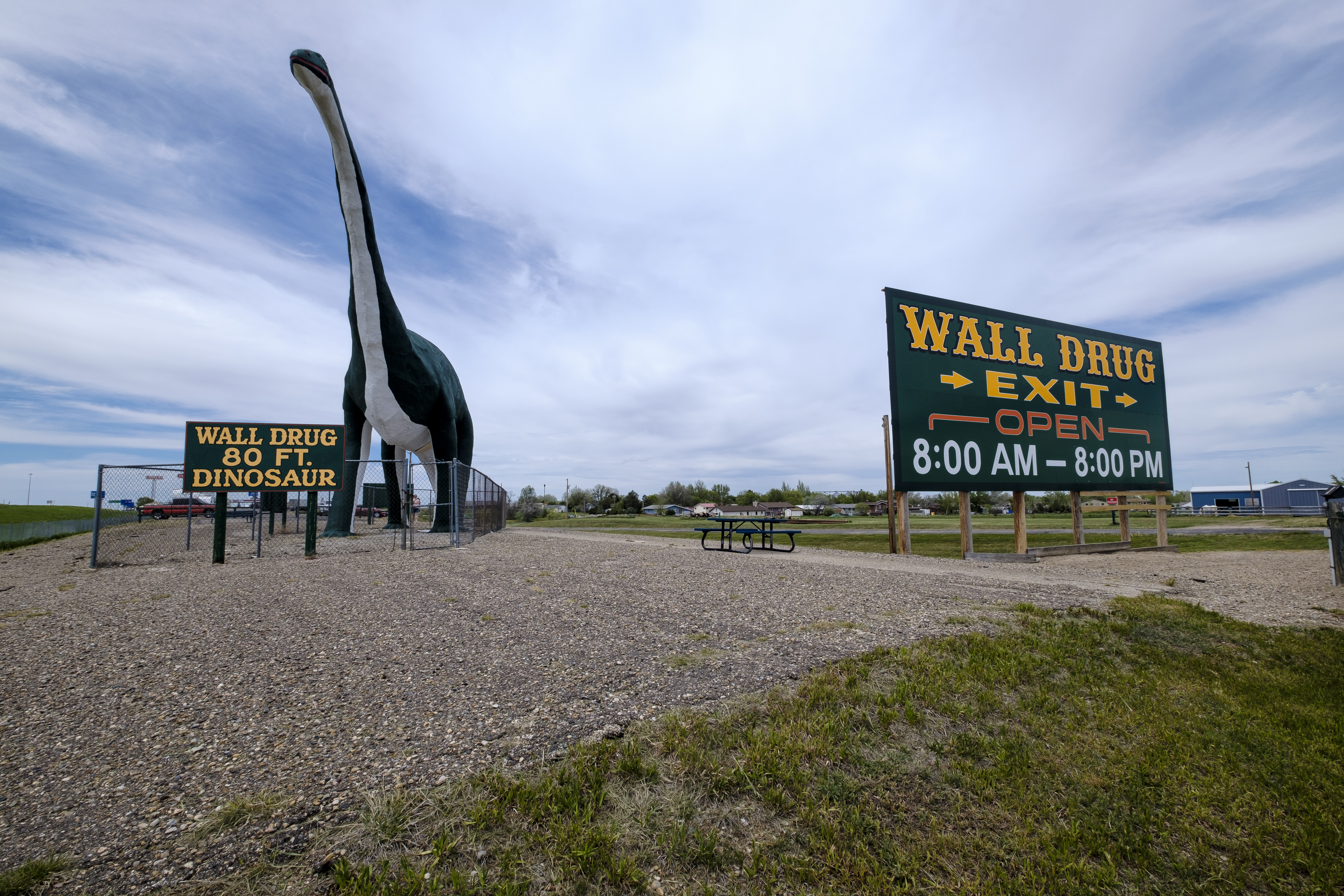

- Location in Pennington County and the state of South Dakota

- Location in the United States
- Coordinates: 43°59′38″N 102°14′42″W
- Country: United States
- State: South Dakota
- County: Pennington
- Incorporated: 1908

Area
  - Total: 2.71 sq mi (7.02 km^{2})
  - Land: 2.63 sq mi (6.81 km^{2})
  - Water: 0.081 sq mi (0.21 km^{2})
- Elevation: 2,815 ft (858 m)

Population (2020)
  - Total: 699
  - Density: 265.8/sq mi (102.62/km^{2})
- Time zone: UTC−7 (Mountain (MST))
  - Summer (DST): UTC−6 (MDT)
- ZIP code: 57790
- Area code: 605
- FIPS code: 46-68380
- GNIS feature ID: 1267622
- Website: www.wallsd.us

Wall is a city in Pennington County, South Dakota, United States. Its Lakota name is Makȟóšiča Aglágla Otȟuŋwahe, meaning "Town alongside the Badlands".

Wall's population was 699 at the 2020 census.

== History ==
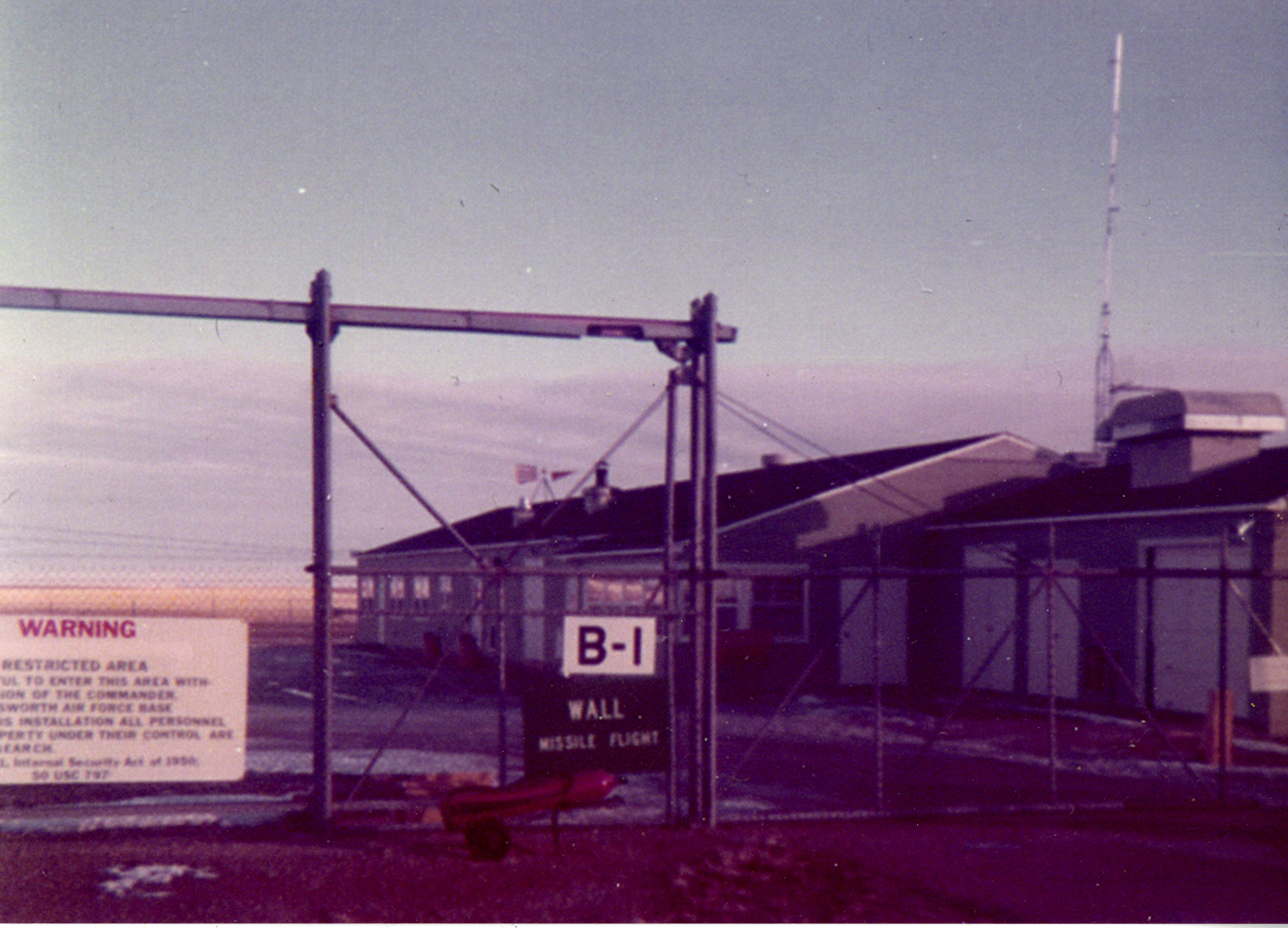
Missile launch control Bravo-01, about 4 miles west of Wall

Wall was platted in 1907 when the Chicago and North Western Railroad was extended to that point. The town was incorporated in 1908. Wall was named for the "natural wall" in rock formations by the Badlands National Park.

The town is most famous for the Wall Drug Store, which opened as a small pharmacy in 1931 during the Depression, located at that time on Route 16A. The store eventually developed into a large roadside tourist attraction.

The National Grasslands Visitor Center is also located in Wall.

== Geography ==
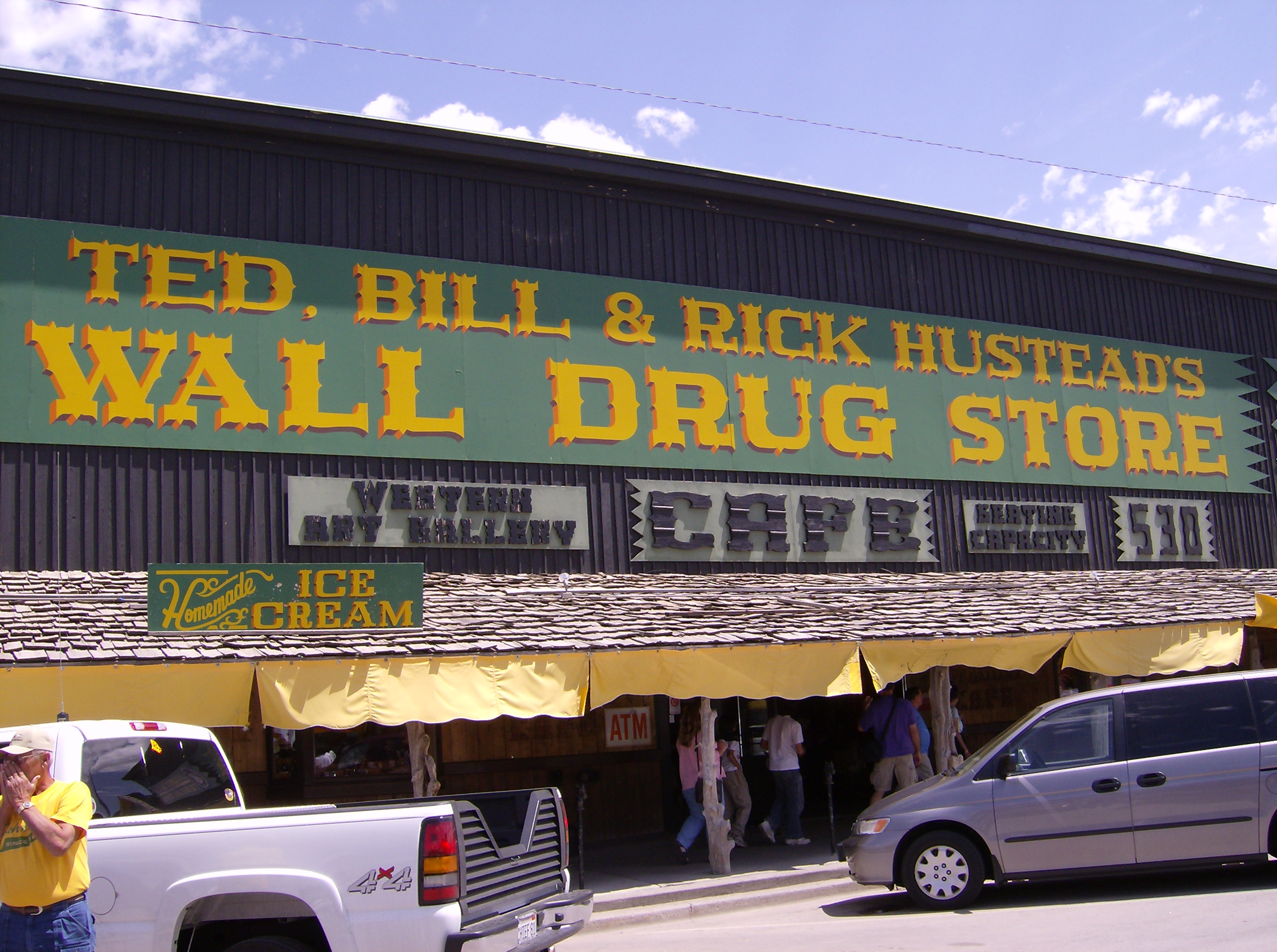
Wall Drug

According to the United States Census Bureau, the town has a total area of 2.22 square miles (5.75 km^{2}), of which 2.17 square miles (5.62 km^{2}) is land and 0.05 square miles (0.13 km^{2}) is water. It is the largest settlement in the area.

The town is located on the eastern side of Pennington County, across the Cheyenne River, and accessed from the I-90.

== Demographics ==
Historical population
Census	Pop.	Note	%±
1910	167		—
1920	224		34.1%
1930	326		45.5%
1940	500		53.4%
1950	556		11.2%
1960	629		13.1%
1970	786		25.0%
1980	770		−2.0%
1990	834		8.3%
2000	818		−1.9%
2010	766		−6.4%
2020	699		−8.7%
U.S. Decennial Census

=== 2010 census ===
At the 2010 census there were 766 people, 359 households, and 212 families in the town. The population density was 353.0 inhabitants per square mile (136.3/km^{2}). There were 436 housing units at an average density of 200.9 per square mile (77.6/km^{2}). The racial makeup of the town was 88.9% White, 0.1% African American, 7.0% Native American, 0.1% Asian, and 3.8% from two or more races. Hispanic or Latino of any race were 1.0%.

Of the 359 households 21.7% had children under the age of 18 living with them, 49.6% were married couples living together, 4.5% had a female householder with no husband present, 5.0% had a male householder with no wife present, and 40.9% were non-families. 39.6% of households were one person and 18.1% were one person aged 65 or older. The average household size was 2.13 and the average family size was 2.82.

The median age in the town was 47.1 years. 21.4% of residents were under the age of 18; 7.4% were between the ages of 18 and 24; 19.7% were from 25 to 44; 31.8% were from 45 to 64; and 19.6% were 65 or older. The gender makeup of the town was 50.4% male and 49.6% female.

=== 2000 census ===
At the 2000 census, there were 818 people, 349 households, and 212 families residing in Wall. The population density was 404.2 inhabitants per square mile (156.1/km^{2}). There were 438 housing units at an average density of 216.4 per square mile (83.6/km^{2}). The racial makeup of the town was 91.44% White, 0.24% African American, 6.11% Native American, 0.12% Asian, 0.49% Pacific Islander, 0.24% from other races, and 1.34% from two or more races. Hispanics or Latinos of any race were 0.73% of the population.

Of the 349 households 28.1% had children under the age of 18 living with them, 51.3% were married couples living together, 7.2% had a female householder with no husband present, and 39.0% were non-families. 35.0% of households were one person and 16.6% were one person aged 65 or older. The average household size was 2.31 and the average family size was 3.03.

The age distribution was 25.9% under 18, 7.9% from 18 to 24, 20.5% from 25 to 44, 27.5% from 45 to 64, and 18.1% who were 65 or older. The median age was 42 years. For every 100 females, there were 88.9 males. For every 100 females age 18 and over, there were 91.8 males.

The median household income was $36,563, and the median family income was $45,417. Males had a median income of $29,286 versus $19,821 for females. The per capita income for the town was $20,848. About 5.8% of families and 8.7% of the population were below the poverty line, including 13.4% of those under age 18 and 12.8% of those age 65 or over.

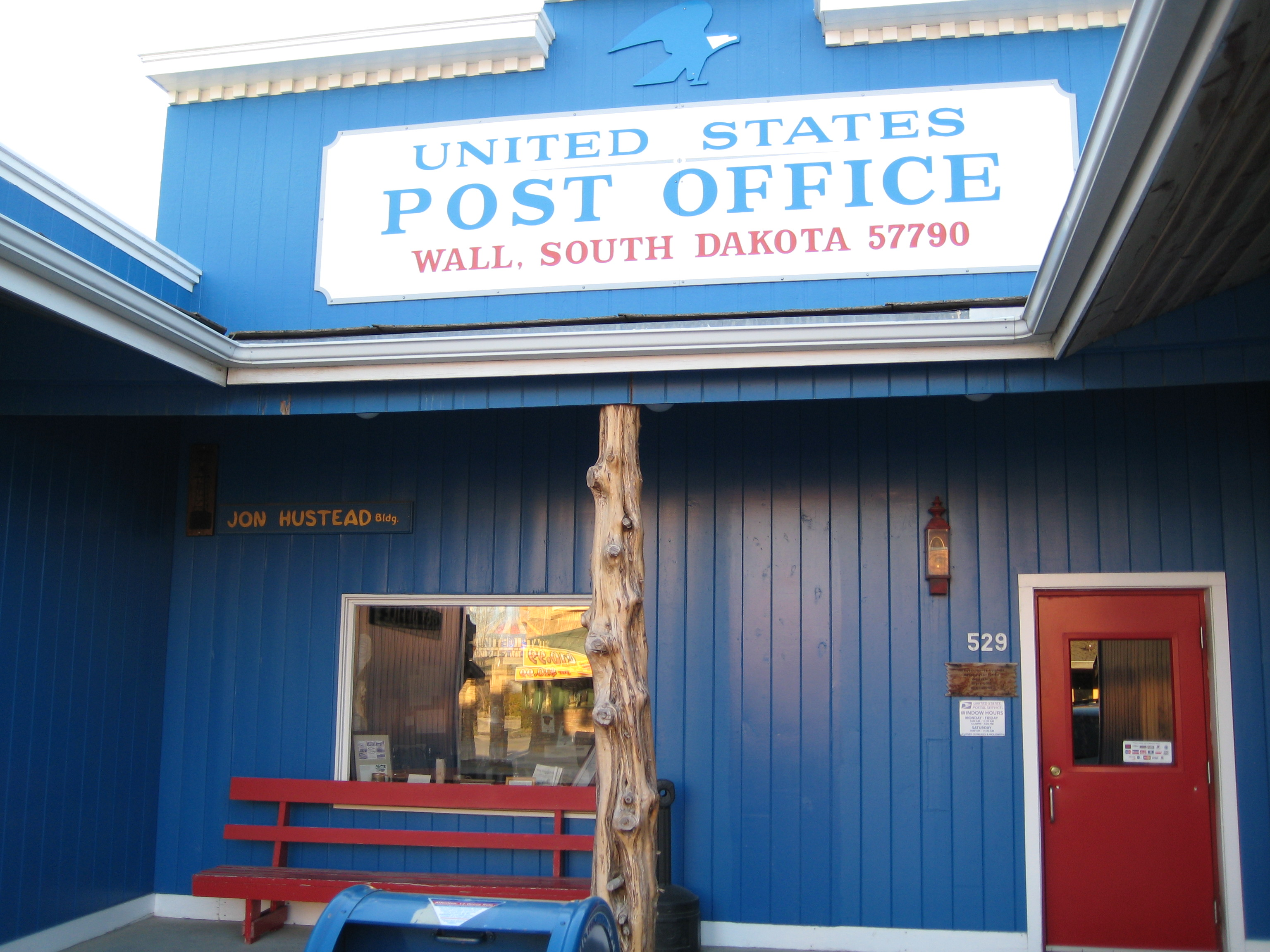
U.S. Post office in Wall, South Dakota

== Transportation ==
The Wall Municipal Airport is a general aviation airport located less than a mile northwest of Wall. The airport is owned by the City of Wall.

Intercity bus service to the city is provided by Jefferson Lines.

== Education ==
The school district is Wall School District 51-5.

== See also ==
- Wall Drug
