= Emmet (Cornish) =

Nickname to refer to tourists who visit Cornwall

Emmet (alt. spellings emmit, emit) is a word in the Cornish dialect of English that is used to refer to tourists or holidaymakers coming to Cornwall. There is debate over whether the term is pejorative or not. It originally referred to tourists who visit Cornwall, but has also been used by native Cornish folk to refer to "incomers" or residents who have moved to the county but were not born there.

== Etymology ==
It is commonly thought to be derived from the Cornish-language word for ant, being an analogy to the way in which both tourists and ants are often red in colour and appear to mill around. However the word is actually from the Cornish dialect of English, and is derived from Old English ǣmete, from which the standard English word ant is also derived (compare German Ameise "ant"). The Cornish word for ants is actually moryon (singulative moryonen).

== Porth Emmet ==
Porthemmet is a beach that supposedly can only be accessed via a cave found between Harlyn and St Merryn. It has been rumoured to have existed since the 1990s, but is considered a hoax as many tourists try to locate it, but cannot.

In August 2007, Truro-born Jonty Haywood began promoting a fictional Porthemmet (Port of Emmet, also sometimes Emmet Bay) beach in North Cornwall with fake road signs and a hoax website, which directed people to random areas on the north coast, confusing tourists and amusing locals. In July 2008, Haywood placed a further set of signs. Jonty was not the original instigator of the hoax.

== 2021 graffiti ==
In August 2021 a number of incidents were reported in which the word 'emmet' was used pejoratively in graffiti across Cornwall. At Pedn Vounder beach the phrase 'Emmets go home' was spray-painted onto rocks, whilst 'Die emmets' appeared on the welcome sign to the town of Hayle.

== See also ==
- Grockle – a similar West Country dialect word used in Devon but emmet is distinctly Cornish.
- Benny (slang) – Jersey Shore term for rude tourists
- Cornish self-government movement – Nationalist movement in the United Kingdom
- Constitutional status of Cornwall
- Mebyon Kernow – Political party in Cornwall
- Overtourism – Excessive number of tourists
- Politics of Cornwall – South West England county
- Shoobie – Type of tourist
- Touron – Pejorative for irresponsible tourists
