= Investigations into the Fukushima nuclear accident =

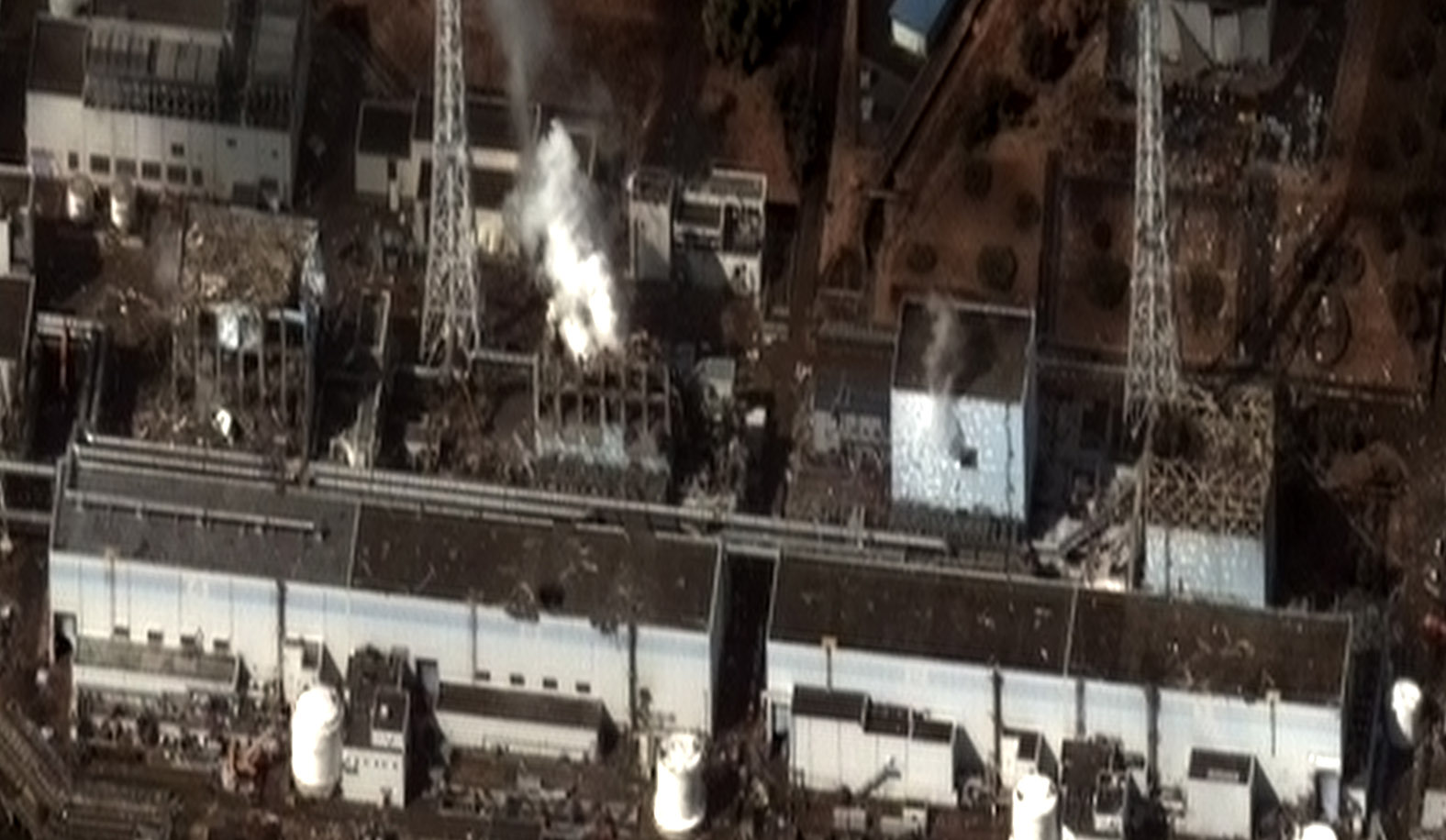
- Satellite image on 16 March 2011 of the four damaged reactor buildings
- Date: 11 March 2011
- Location: Futaba-machi and Okuma-machi, Futaba-gun, Fukushima Prefecture, Japan
- Outcome: INES Level 7 (ratings by Japanese authorities as of 11 April)
- Injuries: 37 with physical injuries, 2 workers taken to hospital with radiation burns

Investigations into the Fukushima Daiichi Nuclear Disaster (or Accident) began on 11 March 2011 when a series of equipment failures, core melt and down, and releases of radioactive materials occurred at the Fukushima Daiichi Nuclear Power Station from the 2011 off the Pacific coast of Tohoku Earthquake and tsunami on the same day.

== Introduction ==
In Japan, the 2011 off the Pacific coast of Tohoku Earthquake occurred at 14:46 on 11 March 2011. At the Fukushima Daiichi Nuclear Power Station (Fukushima Daiichi NPS), operated by the Tokyo Electric Power Company (TEPCO), the earthquake and tsunami caused the compound accident (hereinafter called Fukushima Daiichi Nuclear Accident) consisting of Station BlackOut (SBO) incident, Unit 1, 2, 3 severe core damage accidents, Unit 1, 2, 4 hydrogen explosion accidents, radioactive releases and so on.

In response to the early events of this accident, Japanese government declared a nuclear emergency situation and established the Nuclear Emergency Response Headquarters (NERHQ), which instructed the Fukushima Prefectural Governor and relevant local governments to issue an evacuation order to citizens from the nearby Fukushima Daiichi NPS.

Significant amounts of radioactive material have also been released into ground and ocean waters. Measurements taken by the Japanese government 30–50 km from the plant showed caesium-137 levels high enough to cause concern, leading the government to ban the sale of food grown in the area.

A few of the plant's workers were severely injured or killed by the disaster conditions resulting from the earthquake. There were no immediate deaths due to direct radiation exposures, but at least six workers have exceeded lifetime legal limits for radiation and more than 300 have received significant radiation doses. Predicted future cancer deaths due to accumulated radiation exposures in the population living near Fukushima have ranged from none to 100 to a non-peer-reviewed "guesstimate" of 1,000. On 16 December 2011, Japanese authorities declared the plant to be stable, although it would take decades to decontaminate the surrounding areas and to decommission the plant altogether.

=== A process overview of the accident ===
At the Fukushima Daiichi NPS, all the off-site power supply was lost due to the earthquake. Later, the subsequent arrival of the tsunami caused flooding of many cooling seawater pumps, emergency diesel generators (EDGs), and power panels which were housed in low-lying rooms. This resulted in the total loss of AC power at Units 1 through 5. As nuclear reactor coolant systems stopped for a long time from cutting power, the reactors overheated due to the normal high radioactive decay heat produced in the first few days after nuclear reactor shutdown.

As the water boiled away in the reactors and the water levels in the fuel rod pools dropped, the reactor fuel rods began to overheat severely, and to melt down. In the hours and days that followed, Reactors 1, 2 and 3 experienced full meltdown.

In the intense heat and pressure of the melting reactors, a reaction between the nuclear fuel metal cladding and the remaining water surrounding them produced explosive hydrogen gas. As workers struggled to cool and shut down the reactors, several hydrogen-air chemical explosions occurred.

== Investigation Groups ==
National Diet of Japan Fukushima Nuclear Accident Independent Investigation Commission

The National Diet of Japan Fukushima Nuclear Accident Independent Investigation Commission (NAIIC) was established by the National Diet of Japan as the first independent investigation commission on 8 December 2011.

On 5 July 2012, NAIIC released an executive summary report of The Fukushima Nuclear Accident. The panel is due to deliver its final report at the end of July.

Investigation Committee on the Accident at the Fukushima Nuclear Power Stations of Tokyo Electric Power Company

The Investigation Committee on the Accident at the Fukushima Nuclear Power Stations of Tokyo Electric Power Company (ICANPS) was established by the Cabinet decision on 24 May 2011.

On 2 December 2011, ICANPS issued an interim report. On 23 July 2012, the government appointed the committee submitted its final report to the Japanese government.

TEPCO Internal Investigation

On 20 June 2012, TEPCO released its final internal investigation report. In the report, TEPCO complained that top politicians, including the prime minister, interfered with recovery efforts during the initial stages of the disaster by making specific requests that were out of touch with what was actually taking place at the plant. TEPCO concluded that the direct cause of the accident was the tsunami which knocked out the reactors' cooling system. TEPCO also admitted that it was at fault in not being prepared for the situation, but said that its workers did the best they could "amid unprecedented circumstances."

Tepco admitted for the first time on 12 October 2012 that it had failed to take stronger measures to prevent disasters for fear of inviting lawsuits or protests against its nuclear plants.

Others

As part of the government inquiry, the House of Representatives of Japan's special science committee directed TEPCO to submit to them its manuals and procedures for dealing with reactor accidents. TEPCO responded by submitting manuals with most of the text blotted out. In response, the Nuclear and Industrial Safety Agency ordered TEPCO to resubmit the manuals by 28 September 2011 without hiding any of the content. TEPCO replied that it would comply with the order.

On 24 October NISA published a large portion of Tokyo Electric Power Company's procedural manuals for nuclear accidents. These were the manuals that the operator of the Fukushima Daiichi nuclear power plant earlier did send to the Lower House with most of the contents blacked out, saying that this information should be kept secret to protect its intellectual property rights, and that disclosure would offer information to possible terrorists. NISA ordered TEPCO to send the manuals without any redaction, as the law orders. 200 pages were released from the accident procedural manuals used for Fukushima Daiichi nuclear power plant. All their contents were published, only the names of individuals were left out.

The agency said, the decision to publish the manuals was taken, for transparency in the search what caused the nuclear accident in Fukushima and also to establish better safety measures for the future.

On 24 October 2011 the first meeting was held by a group of 6 nuclear energy specialists invited by NISA to discuss the lessons to be learned from the accidents in Fukushima.

On 28 February 2012, the Independent Investigation Commission on the Fukushima Nuclear Accident by the Rebuild Japan Initiative Foundation announced an investigation report.

Oregon's United States Senator Ron Wyden toured the plant and issued a statement that the situation was "worse than reported." He sent a letter to Japanese Ambassador Ichiro Fujisaki urging Japan to seek international help to relocate spent fuel rods stored in unsound structures and prevent leakage of dangerous nuclear material.

== See also ==
- List of civilian nuclear accidents
- Lists of nuclear disasters and radioactive incidents
- Timeline of the Fukushima Daiichi nuclear disaster
- Comparison of Fukushima and Chernobyl nuclear accidents

Investigation Committees

- National Diet of Japan Fukushima Nuclear Accident Independent Investigation Commission
- Investigation Committee on the Accident at the Fukushima Nuclear Power Stations of Tokyo Electric Power Company

== Sources ==
National Diet of Japan Fukushima Nuclear Accident Independent Investigation Commission (NAIIC) [国会事故調]

- NAIIC (2012). Executive summary (PDF).
- NAIIC (2012). Main Report.

Investigation Committee on the Accident at Fukushima Nuclear Power Stations of Tokyo Electric Power Company (ICANPS) [政府事故調]

- ICANPS (2011). Executive Summary of the Interim Report.
- ICANPS (2011). Interim Report (Main text).
  - 淵上 正朗; 笠原 直人; 畑村 洋太郎 (2012). 福島原発で何が起こったか 政府事故調技術解説. 日刊工業新聞社. (Technical Commentary)
  - 畑村 洋太郎; 安部 誠治; 淵上 正朗 (2013). 福島原発事故はなぜ起こったか 政府事故調核心解説. 講談社. (Essential Commentary)

Tokyo Electric Power Company Internal Investigation (TEPCO) [東電社内事故調]

- TEPCO (2011). Fukushima Nuclear Accident Analysis Report (Interim Report) (PDF).
  - 石川 迪夫 (2014). 考証 福島原子力事故 炉心溶融・水素爆発はどう起こったか. 日本電気協会新聞部. (Unofficial Report)
  - Michio Ishikawa (2015). A Study of the Fukushima Daiichi Nuclear Accident Process. Springer. ISBN 9784431555438. (the improved above in English)

International Investigations

- IAEA (2015). The Fukushima Daiichi Accident Report by The Director General (PDF).
- NEA (2016). Five Years after the Fukushima Daiichi Accident: Nuclear Safety Improvements and Lessons Learnt (PDF).
