= Fukushima nuclear accident investigation =

Fukushima nuclear accident investigation may refer to:

- National Diet of Japan Fukushima Nuclear Accident Independent Investigation Commission
- Investigation Committee on the Accident at the Fukushima Nuclear Power Stations of Tokyo Electric Power Company
