= Yoko Hayashi =

Japanese lawyer

- Born: Hayashi Yōko; June 9, 1956 (age 70); Mito, Ibaraki, Japan
- Occupation: Lawyer

Yoko Hayashi (林 陽子, Hayashi Yōko; born June 9, 1956) is a Japanese lawyer and partner in the Athena Law Office. She was formerly an alternate member to the United Nations Sub-Commission on the Promotion and Protection of Human Rights from 2004 to 2006. In 2008, she became a member of the Committee which monitors the Convention on the Elimination of All Forms of Discrimination against Women (CEDAW), and in 2015 was serving as Chairperson of the Committee on the Elimination of Discrimination against Women. Hayashi has used her legal expertise to improve the status and protect the rights of women.

== Biography ==
Yoko Hayashi was born on June 9, 1956 in Mito, Ibaraki, Japan and attended Waseda University, where she graduated with an LL.B. in law in 1979. She was admitted to the Daini Tokyo Bar Association in 1983 and served as the Deputy President of the Women’s Bar Association of Japan from 2002 to 2004.

Hayashi served as legal counsel for the Tokyo Rape Crisis Centre from 1983 to 1997 and in 1995, served as an adviser to the Japanese Government on the UN 4th World Conference on Women, held in Beijing. In 1996, her commentary entitled "Policies of the Japanese Government Toward Women" was published in a compendium entitled Voices from the Japanese Women's Movement. The commentary was critical of the lack of equality and protection for women in Japan.

She has been a member of the Expert Committee on Violence against Women (from 2000–2013) and the Specialist Committee on Basic Issues (from 2009–present) for the Gender Equality Bureau of the Japanese Cabinet. Between 2011 and 2012 she served on the Investigation Committee on the Accident at the Fukushima Nuclear Power Stations of Tokyo Electric Power Company.

In 2004, she was selected as an alternate member to the United Nations Sub-Commission on the Promotion and Protection of Human Rights on which she served until 2006. In 2008 she became a member of the Convention on the Elimination of All Forms of Discrimination against Women (CEDAW) and has served as an expert on the Women's Anti-Discrimination Committee throughout her tenure. The committee is responsible for completing human rights reviews of member countries and evaluating their performances on women's inclusion and protection. Hayashi served as the Chairperson of the Committee on the Elimination of Discrimination against Women (2015-2016).

== Selected bibliography ==
- "Review on Child Abuse Prevention Law", Child Abuse and Neglect Vol. 2 No. 2, (2000) (in Japanese).
- "What is 'Discrimination Against Women'?: Unfair treatment of women for reasons of pregnancy and birth and the equal opportunity law", Josei to Rodo 21 Vol. 15 No. 58, pp. 7–16 (2006) (in Japanese).
- "Discrimination against children born out of wedlock in terms of inheritance", Handbook on Practice of International Human Rights Law (2007) (in Japanese).
- "The Human Rights Council from the viewpoint of the Subcommission on Human Rights", Human Rights International No. 18, pp. 107–109 (2007) (in Japanese).
- "Protection for victims under the revised anti-domestic violence law, the human rights mechanism in prospect", Yushindo-Kobunsha (Tokyo) (2007) (in Japanese).
- "Women’s Rights are Human Rights—issues surrounding the contemporary women’s rights", The memorial publication of 60th anniversary of Japan Civil Liberties Union, Shinhyoron (2007) (in Japanese).
- "The 30th anniversary of CEDAW, the achievements and challenges”. Human Rights Monthly No. 251, (2009) (in Japanese).
- "CEDAW –State Responsibility and Remedies to Victims", Gender and Law Society, Vol. 1 pp 139–153 (2012) (in Japanese).
- "Implementation of the Convention on the Elimination of All Forms of Discrimination against Women in Japan", Journal of East Asia and International Law, Vol. 6 No. 2 (30 September 2013): pp 341–366 (in English). Database: DBpia
