= Fukushima nuclear accident =

2011 nuclear accident in Japan

- Part of the 2011 Tōhoku earthquake and tsunami
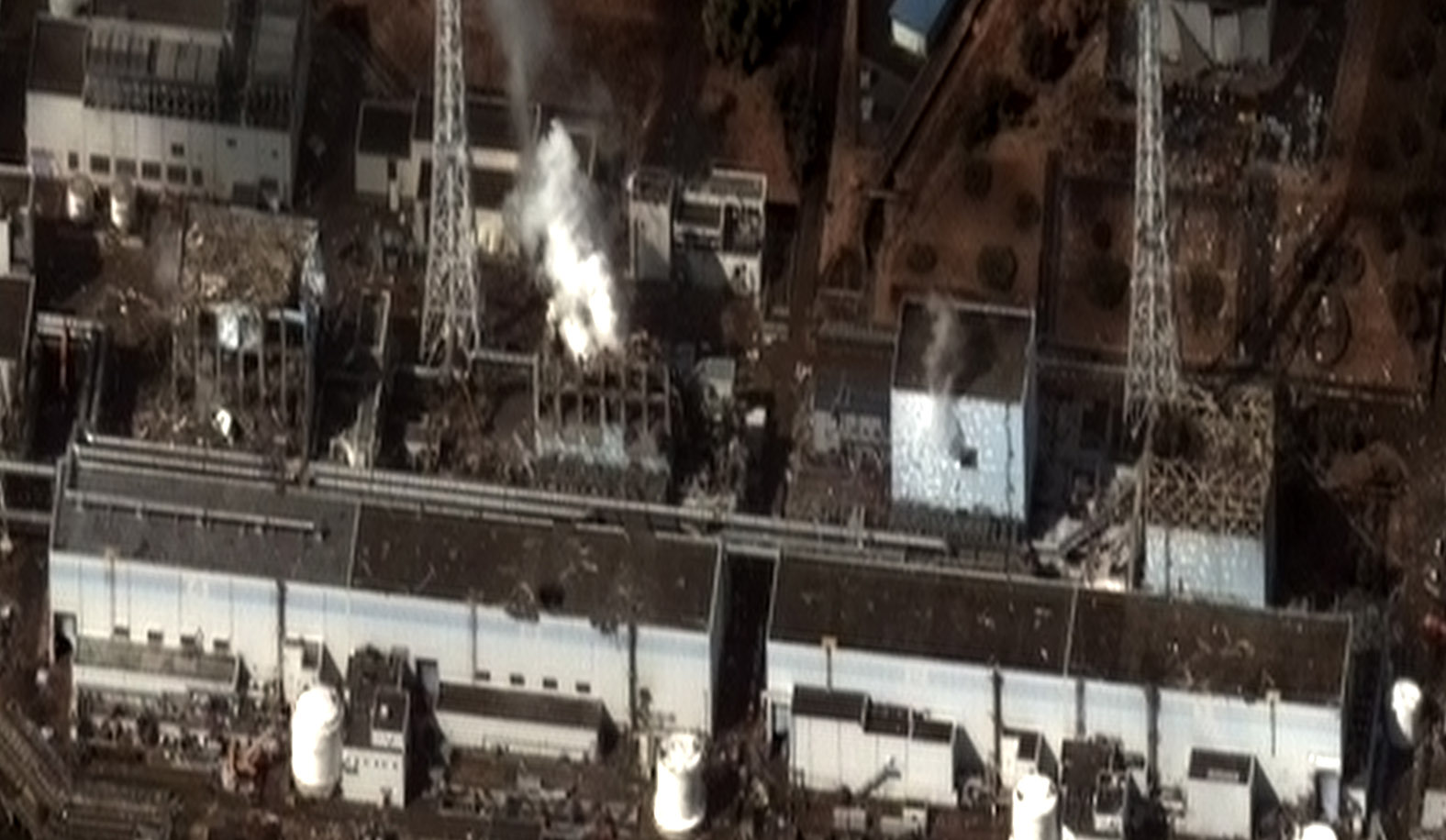
- The four damaged reactor buildings (from left: Units 4, 3, 2, and 1) on 16 March 2011. Hydrogen-air explosions in Units 1, 3, and 4 caused structural damage.
- Date: 11 March 2011; 15 years ago
- Location: Ōkuma and Futaba, Fukushima, Japan; 37°25′17″N 141°1′57″E
- Outcome: International Nuclear Event Scale Level 7 (major accident)
- Deaths: 1 suspected from radiation (lung cancer, 4 years later).
- Injuries: 6 with cancer or leukemia, 16 with physical injuries due to hydrogen explosions. 2 workers hospitalized with radiation burns
- Displaced: 164,000+ local residents

Cross-section of a typical BWR Mark I containment as used in units 1 to 5. RPV: reactor pressure vessel DW: drywell enclosing reactor pressure vessel WW: wetwell – torus-shaped all around the base enclosing steam suppression pool. Excess steam from the drywell enters the wetwell water pool via downcomer pipes. SFP: spent fuel pool area SCSW: secondary concrete shield wall

On 11 March 2011, a major nuclear accident started at the Fukushima Daiichi Nuclear Power Plant in Ōkuma, Fukushima, Japan. The direct cause was the Tōhoku earthquake and tsunami, which resulted in electrical grid failure and damaged nearly all of the power plant's backup energy sources. The subsequent inability to sufficiently cool reactors after shutdown compromised containment and resulted in the release of radioactive contaminants into the surrounding environment. It is regarded by the United Nations Scientific Committee on the Effects of Atomic Radiation as the worst nuclear incident since the Chernobyl disaster.

According to the United Nations Scientific Committee on the Effects of Atomic Radiation, "no adverse health effects among Fukushima residents have been documented that are directly attributable to radiation exposure from the Fukushima Daiichi nuclear plant accident". Insurance compensation was paid for one death from lung cancer, but this does not prove a causal relationship between radiation and the cancer. Six other people have been reported as having developed cancer or leukemia. Two workers were hospitalized because of radiation burns, and several other people sustained physical injuries as a consequence of the accident. Large‑scale screening programs, including thyroid examinations for children and ongoing epidemiological surveys, have reported elevated detection rates of certain conditions; however, experts attribute much of this increase to enhanced medical surveillance rather than radiation exposure itself.

Following the accident, at least 164,000 residents of the surrounding area were permanently or temporarily displaced (either voluntarily or by evacuation order). The displacements resulted in at least 51 deaths as well as stress and fear of radiological hazards. The evacuation was accused of causing more harm than it prevented. Ten years later, over 41,000 people from Fukushima were still living as evacuees.

Investigations faulted lapses in safety and oversight, namely failures in risk assessment and evacuation planning. Controversy surrounds the disposal of treated wastewater once used to cool the reactor, resulting in numerous protests in neighboring countries. The expense of cleaning up the radioactive contamination and compensation for the victims of the Fukushima nuclear accident was estimated by Japan's trade ministry in November 2016 to be 20 trillion yen (equivalent to 180 billion US dollars).

== Background ==
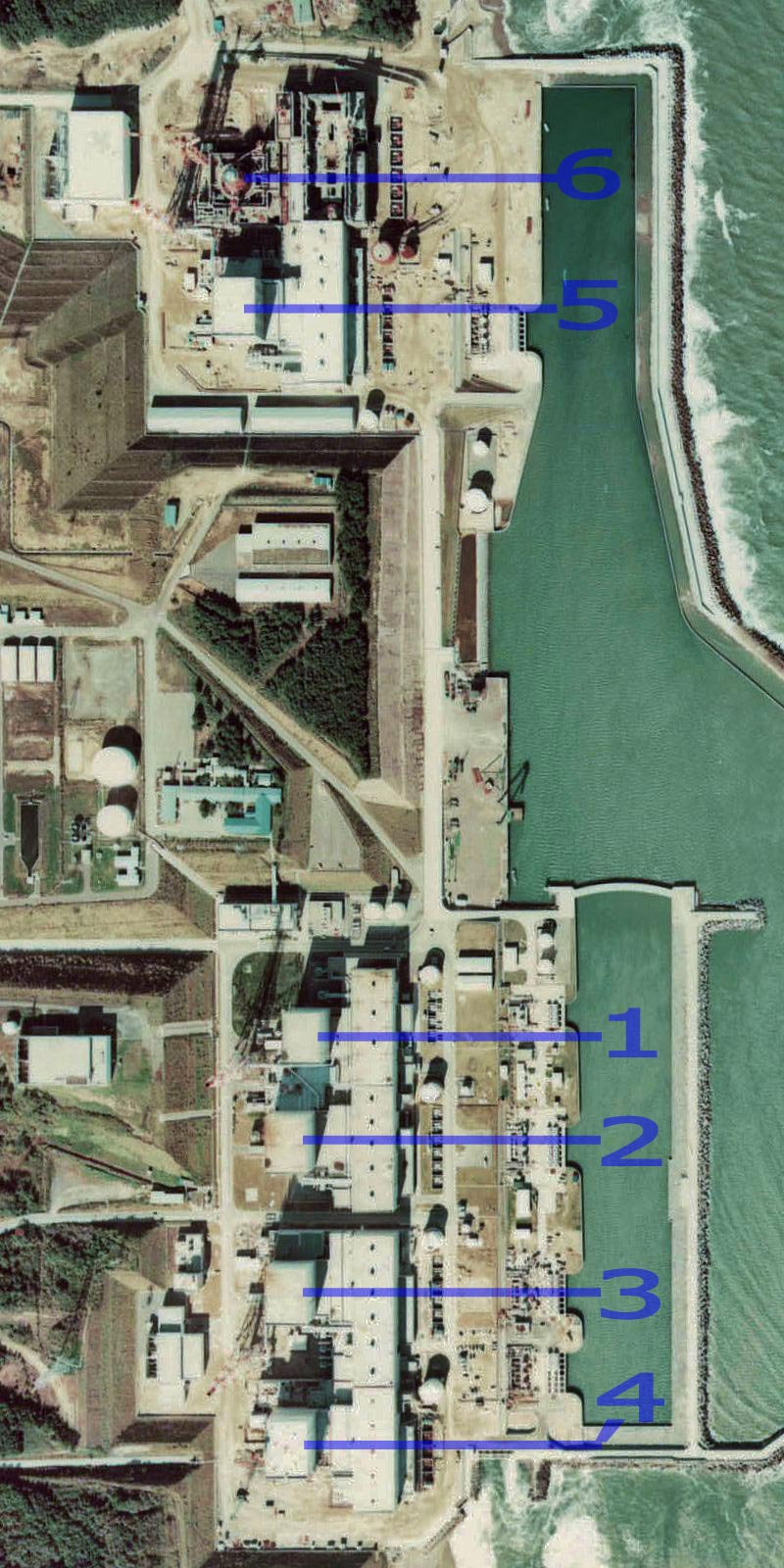
Aerial view of the station in 1975, showing separation between units 5 and 6, and 1–4. Unit 6, completed in 1979, is seen under construction.

The Fukushima Daiichi Nuclear Power Plant consisted of six General Electric (GE) light water boiling water reactors (BWRs). Unit 1 was a GE type 3 BWR. Units 2–5 were type 4. Unit 6 was a type 5.

At the time of the Tōhoku earthquake on 11 March 2011, units 1–3 were operating. However, the spent fuel pools of all units still required cooling.

=== Materials ===
Many of the internal components and fuel assembly cladding are made from a zirconium alloy (Zircaloy) for its low neutron cross section. At normal operating temperatures (~286 °C (547 °F)), it is inert. However, above 1,200 °C (2,190 °F), Zircaloy can be oxidized by steam to form hydrogen gas or by uranium dioxide to form uranium metal. Both of these reactions are exothermic. In combination with the exothermic reaction of boron carbide with stainless steel, these reactions can contribute to the overheating of a reactor.

=== Isolated cooling systems ===
In the event of an emergency, reactor pressure vessels (RPV) are automatically isolated from the turbines and main condenser and are instead switched to a secondary condenser system, which is designed to cool the reactor without the need for pumps powered by external power or generators. The isolation condenser (IC) system involved a closed coolant loop from the pressure vessel with a heat exchanger in a dedicated condenser tank. Steam would be forced into the heat exchanger by the reactor pressure, and the condensed coolant would be fed back into the vessel by gravity. Each reactor was initially designed to be equipped with two redundant ICs which were each capable of cooling the reactor for at least 8 hours (at which point, the condenser tank would have to be refilled). However, it was possible for the IC system to cool the reactor too rapidly after shutdown, which could result in undesirable thermal stress on the reactor pressure vessel. To avoid this, the protocol called for reactor operators to manually open and close the condenser loop using electrically operated control valves.

After the construction of Unit 1, the following units were designed with new open-cycle reactor core isolation cooling (RCIC) systems. This new system used the steam from the reactor vessel to drive a turbine, which would power a pump to inject water into the pressure vessel from an external storage tank to maintain the water level in the reactor vessel. The system was designed to operate for at least 4 hours (until the depletion of coolant or mechanical failure). Additionally, this system could be converted into a closed-loop system, which draws coolant from the suppression chamber (SC) instead of the storage tank, should the storage tank be depleted. Although this system could function autonomously without an external energy source (besides the steam from the reactor), direct current (DC) was needed to remotely control it and receive parameters and indications and alternating current (AC) was required to power the isolation valves.

In an emergency where backup on-site power was partially damaged or insufficient to last until a grid connection to off-site power could be restored, these cooling systems could no longer be relied upon to reliably cool the reactor. In such a case, the expected procedure was to vent both the reactor vessel and primary containment using electrically or pneumatically operated valves using the remaining electricity on site. This would lower the reactor pressure sufficiently to allow for low-pressure injection of water into the reactor using the fire protection system to replenish water lost to evaporation.

=== On-site backup power ===
Station operators switched the reactor control to off-site power for shutdown, but the system was damaged by the earthquake. Emergency diesel generators (EDG) then automatically started to provide AC power. Two EDGs were available for each of units 1–5 and three for unit 6. Of the 13 EDGs, 10 were water-cooled and placed in the basements about 7–8 m below the ground level. The coolant water for the EDGs was carried by several seawater pumps placed on the shoreline which also provide water for the main condenser. These components were unhoused and only protected by the seawall. The other three EDGs were air-cooled and were connected to units 2, 4, and 6. The air-cooled EDGs for units 2 and 4 were placed on the ground floor of the spent fuel building, but the switches and various other components were located below, in the basement. The third air-cooled EDG was in a separate building placed inland and at higher elevations. Although these EDGs are intended to be used with their respective reactors, switchable interconnections between unit pairs (1 and 2, 3 and 4, and 5 and 6) allowed reactors to share EDGs should the need arise.

The power station was also equipped with backup DC batteries kept charged by AC power at all times, designed to be able to power the station for approximately 8 hours without EDGs. In units 1, 2, and 4, the batteries were located in the basements alongside the EDGs. In units 3, 5, and 6, the batteries were located in the turbine building where they were raised above ground level.

=== Fuel inventory ===
The units and central storage facility contained the following numbers of fuel assemblies:

Location	Unit 1	Unit 2	Unit 3	Unit 4	Unit 5	Unit 6	Central storage
Reactor fuel assemblies	400	548	548	0	548	764	N/A
Spent fuel assemblies	292	587	514	1331	946	876	6377
New fuel assemblies	100	28	52	204	48	64	N/A

=== Earthquake tolerance ===
The original design basis was a zero-point ground acceleration of 250 Gal and a static acceleration of 470 Gal, based on the 1952 Kern County earthquake (140 Gal, 0.18 g, 1.4 m/s^{2}, 4.6 ft/s^{2}). After the 1978 Miyagi earthquake, when the ground acceleration reached 122 Gal (0.125 g 1.22 m/s^{2}, 4.0 ft/s^{2}) for 30 seconds, no damage to the critical parts of the reactor was found. In 2006, the design of the reactors was reevaluated with new standards requiring the reactors to withstand accelerations ranging up to 450 Gal.

=== Venting systems ===
In the event of an emergency, operators planned to pump water into the reactors to keep them cool. This would inevitably create steam which should not be very radioactive because the fuel would still be in the primary containment vessel. Therefore, the steam would manually be released by venting valves to prevent a high pressure explosion.

== Accident ==
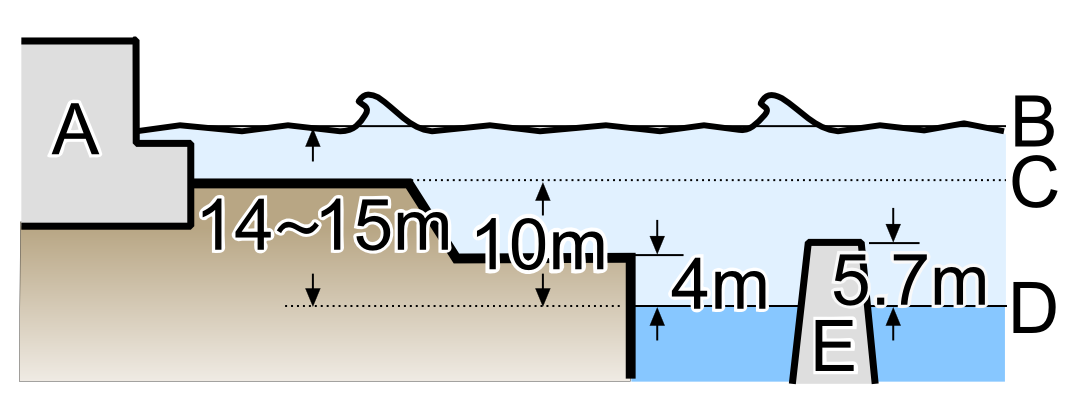
The height of the tsunami that struck the station approximately 50 minutes after the earthquake A: Power station buildings B: Peak height of tsunami C: Ground level of site D: Average sea level E: Seawall to block waves

=== Earthquake ===
The 9.0 M_{W} earthquake occurred at 14:46 on Friday, 11 March 2011, with the epicenter off of the east coast of the Tōhoku region. It produced a maximum ground g-force of 560, 520 and 560 Gal at units 2, 3, and 5 respectively. This exceeded the seismic reactor design tolerances of 450 Gal, 450 Gal, and 460 Gal for continued operation, but the seismic values were within the design tolerances of unit 6.

Upon detecting the earthquake, all three operating reactors (units 1, 2, and 3) automatically shut down. Due to expected grid failure and damage to the switch station as a result of the earthquake, the power station automatically started up the emergency diesel generators (EDGs), isolated the reactor from the primary coolant loops, and activated the emergency shutdown cooling systems.

=== Tsunami and loss of power ===
The largest tsunami wave was 13–14 m (43–46 feet) high and hit approximately 50 minutes after the initial earthquake, overtopping the seawall and exceeding the plant's ground level, which was 10 m (33 ft) above sea level.

The waves first damaged the seawater pumps along the shoreline, and 10 of the plant's 13 cooling systems for the emergency diesel generators (EDGs). The waves then flooded all turbine and reactor buildings, damaging EDGs and other electrical components and connections located on the ground or basement levels at approximately 15:41. The switching stations that provided power from the three EDGs located higher on the hillside also failed when the building that housed them flooded. One air-cooled EDG, that of unit 6, was unaffected by the flooding and continued to operate. The DC batteries for units 1, 2, and 4 were also inoperable shortly after flooding.

As a result, units 1–5 lost AC power and DC power was lost in units 1, 2, and 4. In response, the operators assumed a loss of coolant in units 1 and 2 and developed a plan in which they would vent the primary containment and inject water into the reactor vessels with firefighting equipment. Tokyo Electric Power Company (TEPCO), the utility operator and owner, notified authorities of a "first-level emergency".

Two workers were killed by the impact of the tsunami.

=== Reactors ===
==== Unit 1 ====
The isolation condenser (IC) was functioning prior to the tsunami, but the DC-operated control valve outside of the primary containment had been in the closed position at the time to prevent thermal stresses on the reactor components. Some indications in the control room stopped functioning and operators correctly assumed loss of coolant (LOC). At 18:18 on 11 March, a few hours after the tsunami, operators attempted to manually open the IC control valve, but the IC failed to function, suggesting that the isolation valves were closed. Although they were kept open during IC operation, the loss of DC power in unit 1 (which occurred shortly before the loss of AC power) automatically closed the AC-powered isolation valves to prevent uncontrolled cooling or a potential LOC. Although this status was unknown to the plant operators, they correctly interpreted the loss of function in the IC system and manually closed the control valves. The plant operators would continue to periodically attempt to restart the IC in the following hours and days, but it did not function.

The plant operators then attempted to use the building's fire protection (FP) equipment, operated by a diesel-driven fire pump (DDFP), to inject water into the reactor vessel. However, the reactor pressure had already increased to many times greater than the limit of the DDFP. Additionally, the team detected high levels of radiation within the secondary confinement structure, indicating damage to the reactor core, and found that the primary containment vessel (PCV) pressure (0.6 MPa) exceeded design specifications (0.528 MPa). In response to this new information, the reactor operators began planning to lower the PCV pressure by venting. The PCV reached its maximum pressure of 0.84 MPa at 02:30 on 12 March, after which it stabilized around 0.8 MPa. The decrease in pressure was due to an uncontrolled vent via an unknown pathway. The plant was notified that Okuma town completed evacuation at 9:02 on 12 March. The staff subsequently began controlled venting. Venting of the PCV was completed later that afternoon at 14:00.

At the same time, pressure in the reactor vessel had been decreasing to equalize with the PCV, and the workers prepared to inject water into the reactor vessel using the DDFP once the pressure had decreased below the 0.8 MPa limit. Unfortunately, the DDFP was found to be inoperable and a fire truck had to be connected to the FP system. This process took about 4 hours, as the FP injection port was hidden under debris. The next morning (12 March, 04:00), approximately 12 hours after the loss of power, freshwater injection into the reactor vessel began, later replaced by a water line at 09:15 leading directly from the water storage tank to the injection port to allow for continuous operation (the fire truck had to be periodically refilled). This continued into the afternoon until the freshwater tank was nearly depleted. In response, injection stopped at 14:53 and the injection of seawater, which had collected in a nearby valve pit (the only other source of water), began. Power was restored to units 1 (and 2) using a mobile generator at 15:30 on 12 March.

At 15:36, a hydrogen explosion damaged the secondary confinement structure (the RB). The workers evacuated shortly after the explosion. The debris produced by the explosion damaged the mobile emergency power generator and the seawater injection lines. The seawater injection lines were repaired and put back into operation at 19:04 until the valve pit was nearly depleted of seawater at 01:10 on the 14th. The seawater injection was temporarily stopped in order to refill the valve pit with seawater using a variety of emergency service and JSDF vehicles. However, the process of restarting seawater injection was interrupted by another explosion in unit 3 RB at 11:01 which damaged water lines and prompted another evacuation. Injection of seawater into unit 1 would not resume until that evening, after 18 hours without cooling.

Subsequent analysis in November 2011 suggested that this extended period without cooling resulted in the melting of the fuel in unit 1, most of which would have escaped the reactor pressure vessel (RPV) and embedded itself into the concrete at the base of the PCV. Although at the time it was difficult to determine how far the fuel had eroded and diffused into the concrete, it was estimated that the fuel remained within the PCV.

Computer simulations from 2013 suggest that "the melted fuel in Unit 1, whose core damage was the most extensive, had breached the bottom of the primary containment vessel and had even partially eaten into its concrete foundation, coming within about 30 cm (1 ft) of leaking into the ground". A Kyoto University nuclear engineer said with regard to these estimates: "We just can't be sure until we actually see the inside of the reactors."

==== Unit 2 ====
Unit 2 was the only other operating reactor which experienced a total loss of AC and DC power. Before the blackout, the RCIC was functioning as designed without the need for operator intervention. The safety relief valves (SRVs) would intermittently release steam directly into the PCV suppression torus at its design pressure and the RCIC properly replenished lost coolant. However, following the total blackout of Unit 2, the plant operators (similar to Unit 1) assumed the worst-case scenario and prepared for a LOC incident. However, when a team was sent to investigate the status of the RCIC of unit 2 the following morning (02:55), they confirmed that the RCIC was operating with the PCV pressure well below design limits. Based on this information, efforts were focused on unit 1. However, the condensate storage tank from which the RCIC draws water was nearly depleted by the early morning, and so the RCIC was manually reconfigured at 05:00 to recirculate water from the suppression chamber instead.

On the 13th, unit 2 was configured to vent the PCV automatically (manually opening all valves, leaving only the rupture disk) and preparations were made to inject seawater from the valve pit via the FP system should the need arise. However, as a result of the explosion in unit 3 the following day, the seawater injection setup was damaged and the isolation valve for the PCV vent was found to be closed and inoperable.

At 13:00 on the 14th, the RCIC pump for unit 2 failed after 68 hours of continuous operation. With no way to vent the PCV, in response, a plan was devised to delay containment failure by venting the reactor vessel into the PCV using the SRVs to allow for seawater injection into the reactor vessel.

The following morning (15 March, 06:15), another explosion was heard on site coinciding with a rapid drop of suppression chamber pressure to atmospheric pressure, interpreted as a malfunction of suppression chamber pressure measurement. Due to concerns about the growing radiological hazard on site, almost all workers evacuated to the Fukushima Daini Nuclear Power Plant.

==== Unit 3 ====
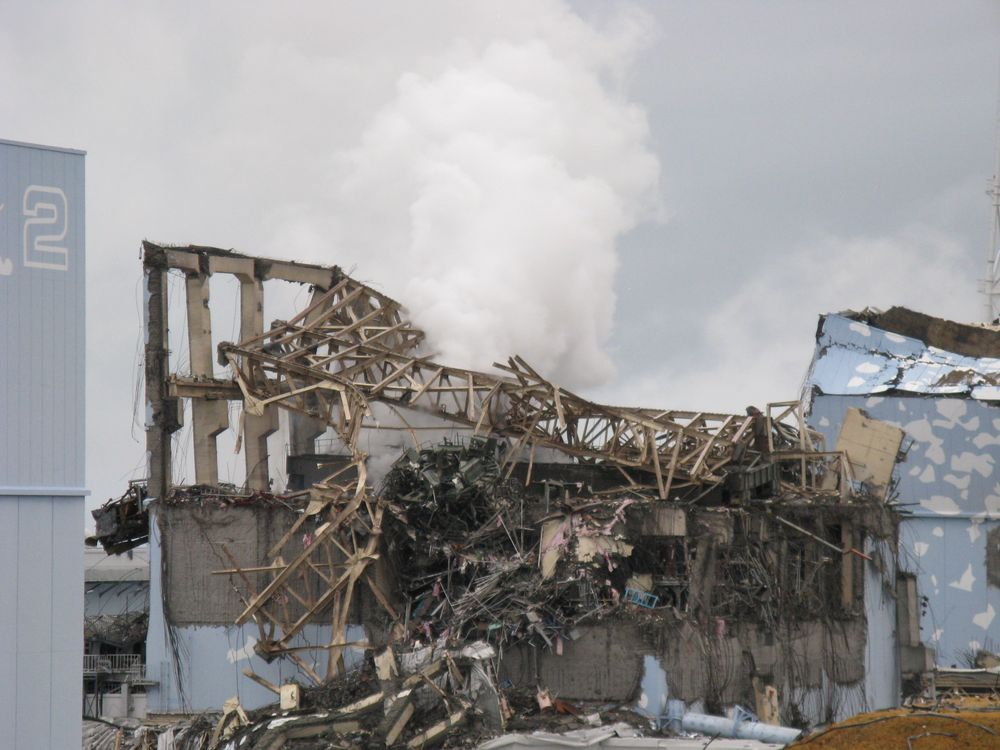
Unit 3 after the explosion on 15 March 2011

Although AC power was lost, some DC power was still available in unit 3 and the workers were able to remotely confirm that the RCIC system was continuing to cool the reactor. However, knowing that their DC supply was limited, the workers managed to extend the backup DC supply to about 2 days by disconnecting nonessential equipment, until replacement batteries were brought from a neighboring power station on the morning of the 13th (with 7 hours between loss and restoration of DC power). At 11:36 the next day, after 20.5 hours of operation, the RCIC system failed. In response, the high-pressure coolant injection (HPCI) system was activated to alleviate the lack of cooling while workers continued to attempt to restart the RCIC. Additionally, the FP system was used to spray the PCV (mainly the SC) with water in order to slow the climbing temperatures and pressures of the PCV.

On the morning of the 13th (02:42), after DC power was restored by new batteries, the HPCI system showed signs of malfunction. The HPCI isolation valve failed to activate automatically upon achieving a certain pressure. In response, the workers switched off HPCI and began injection of water via the lower-pressure firefighting equipment. However, the workers found that the SRVs did not operate to relieve pressure from the reactor vessel to allow water injection by the DDFP. In response, workers attempted to restart the HPCI and RCIC systems, but both failed to restart. Following this loss of cooling, workers established a water line from the valve pit to inject seawater into the reactor alongside unit 2. However, water could not be injected due to RPV pressures exceeding the pump capability. Similarly, preparations were also made to vent the unit 3 PCV, but PCV pressure was not sufficient to burst the rupture disk.

Later that morning (9:08), workers were able to depressurize the reactor by operating the safety relief valves using batteries collected from nearby automobiles. This was shortly followed by the bursting of the venting line rupture disk and the depressurization of the PCV. Unfortunately, venting was quickly stopped by a pneumatic isolation valve which closed on the vent path due to a lack of compressed air, and venting was not resumed until over 6 hours later once an external air compressor could be installed. Despite this, the reactor pressure was immediately low enough to allow for water injection (borated freshwater, as ordered by TEPCO) using the FP system until the freshwater FP tanks were depleted, at which point the injected coolant was switched to seawater from the valve pit.

Cooling was lost once the valve pit was depleted but was resumed two hours later (unit 1 cooling was postponed until the valve pit was filled). However, despite being cooled, PCV pressure continued to rise and the RPV water level continued to drop until the fuel became uncovered on the morning of the 14th (6:20), as indicated by a water level gauge, which was followed by workers evacuating the area out of concerns about a possible second hydrogen explosion similar to unit 1.

Shortly after work resumed to reestablish coolant lines, an explosion occurred in unit 3 RB at 11:01 on 14 March, which further delayed unit 1 cooling and damaged unit 3's coolant lines. Work to reestablish seawater cooling directly from the ocean began two hours later, and cooling of unit 3 resumed in the afternoon (approximately 16:00) and continued until cooling was lost once more as a result of site evacuation on the 15th.

==== Unit 4 ====
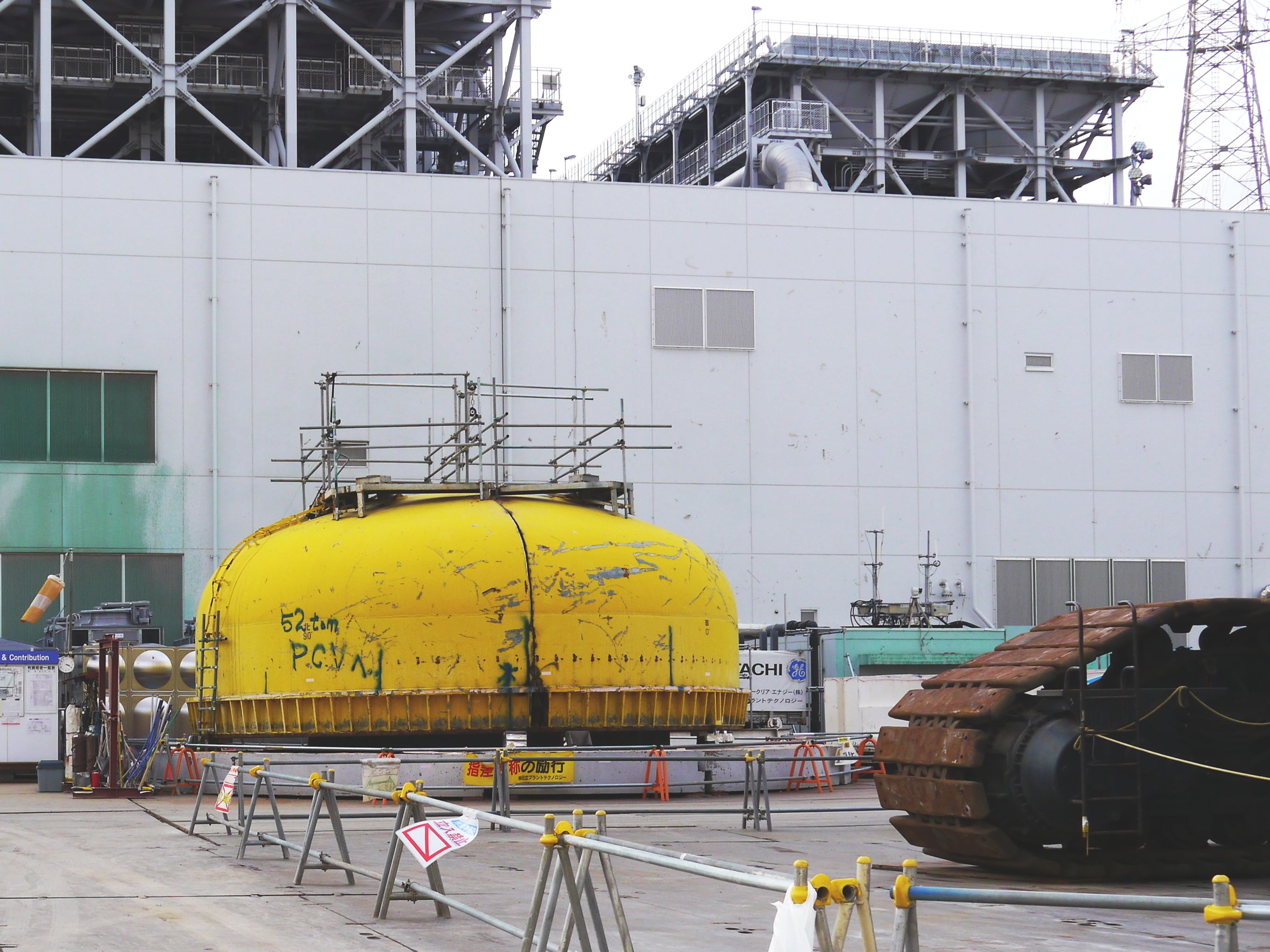
Top of Primary Containment Vessel, Unit 4

Unit 4 was not fueled at the time, but the unit 4 spent fuel pool (SFP) contained a number of fuel rods.

On 15 March, an explosion was observed at unit 4 RB during site evacuation. A team later returned to the power station to inspect unit 4, but were unable to do so due to the present radiological hazard. The explosion damaged the fourth-floor rooftop area of Unit 4, creating two large holes in a wall of the reactor building (RB). The explosion was likely caused by hydrogen passing to unit 4 from unit 3 through shared pipes.

The following day, on the 16th, an aerial inspection was performed by helicopter which confirmed there was sufficient water remaining in the SFP. On the 20th, water was sprayed into the uncovered SFP, later replaced by a concrete pump truck with a boom on the 22nd.

==== Unit 5 ====
Unit 5 was fueled and was undergoing an RPV pressure test at the time of the accident, but the pressure was maintained by an external air compressor and the reactor was not otherwise operating. Removal of decay heat using the RCIC was not possible, as the reactor was not producing sufficient steam. However, the water within the RPV proved sufficient to cool the fuel, with the SRVs venting into the PCV, until AC power was restored on 13 March using the unit 6 interconnection, allowing the use of the low-pressure pumps of the residual heat removal (RHR) system. Unit 5 was the first to achieve a cold shutdown in the afternoon on the 20th.

==== Unit 6 ====
Unit 6 was not operating, and its decay heat was low. All but one EDG was disabled by the tsunami, allowing unit 6 to retain AC-powered safety functions throughout the incident. However, because the RHR was damaged, workers activated the make-up water condensate system to maintain the reactor water level until the RHR was restored on the 20th. Cold shutdown was achieved on the 20th, less than an hour after unit 5.

==== Common Spent Fuel Pool ====
On 21 March, temperatures in the fuel pond had risen slightly, to 61 °C (142 °F), and water was sprayed over the pool. Power was restored to cooling systems on 24 March and by 28 March, temperatures were reported down to 35 °C (95 °F).

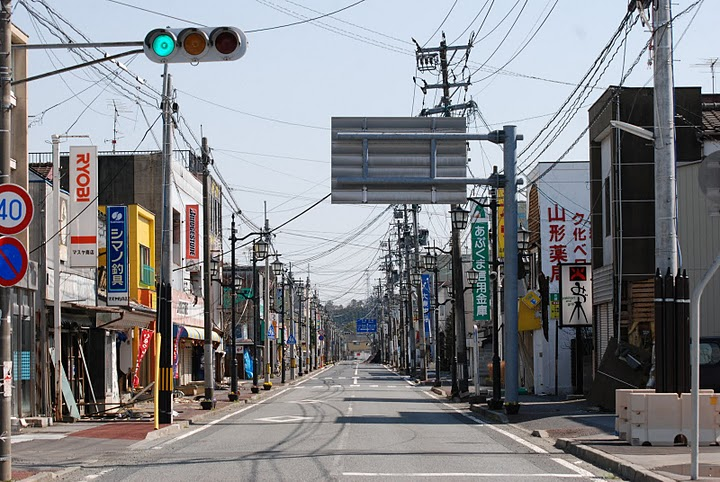
The town of Namie (population 21,000) was evacuated as a result of the accident

=== Radionuclide release ===
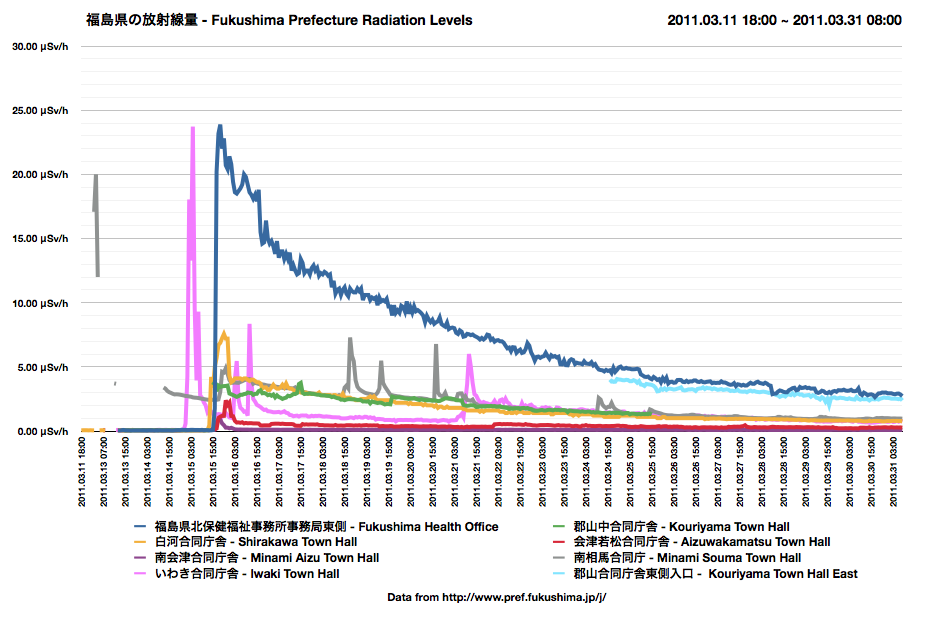
Radiation measurements from Fukushima Prefecture, March 2011

Quantities of the released material are expressed in terms of the three predominant products released: caesium-137 (^{137}Cs), iodine-131 (^{131}I), and xenon-133. Estimates for atmospheric releases range from 7–20 PBq for ^{137}Cs, 100–400 PBq for ^{131}I, and 6,000–12,000 PBq for xenon-133. Once released into the atmosphere, those which remain in a gaseous phase were simply diluted by the atmosphere, but those that precipitate eventually settled on land or in the ocean. Approximately 40–80% of the atmospheric ^{137}Cs was deposited in the ocean. Thus, the majority (90~99%) of the radionuclides deposited were isotopes of iodine and caesium, with a small portion of tellurium, which almost fully vaporized out of the core due to their high vapor pressure. The remaining fraction of deposited radionuclides were of less volatile elements such as barium, antimony, and niobium, of which less than a percent evaporated from the fuel.

In addition to atmospheric deposition, there was also a significant quantity of direct releases into groundwater (and eventually the ocean) through leaks of coolant which had been in direct contact with the fuel. Estimates for this release vary from 1 to 5.5 PBq ^{137}Cs and 10–20 PBq ^{131}I.

According to the French Institute for Radiological Protection and Nuclear Safety, the release from the accident represents the most important individual oceanic emissions of artificial radioactivity ever observed. The Fukushima coast has one of the world's strongest currents (Kuroshio Current). It transported the contaminated waters far into the Pacific Ocean, dispersing the radioactivity. As of late 2011, measurements of both the seawater and the coastal sediments suggested that the consequences for marine life would be minor. Significant pollution along the coast near the plant might persist, because of the continuing arrival of radioactive material transported to the sea by surface water crossing contaminated soil. The possible presence of other radioactive substances, such as strontium-90 or plutonium, had not been sufficiently studied. Recent measurements show persistent contamination of some marine species (mostly fish) caught along the Fukushima coast.

== Consequences ==
=== Evacuation ===
==== Immediate response ====
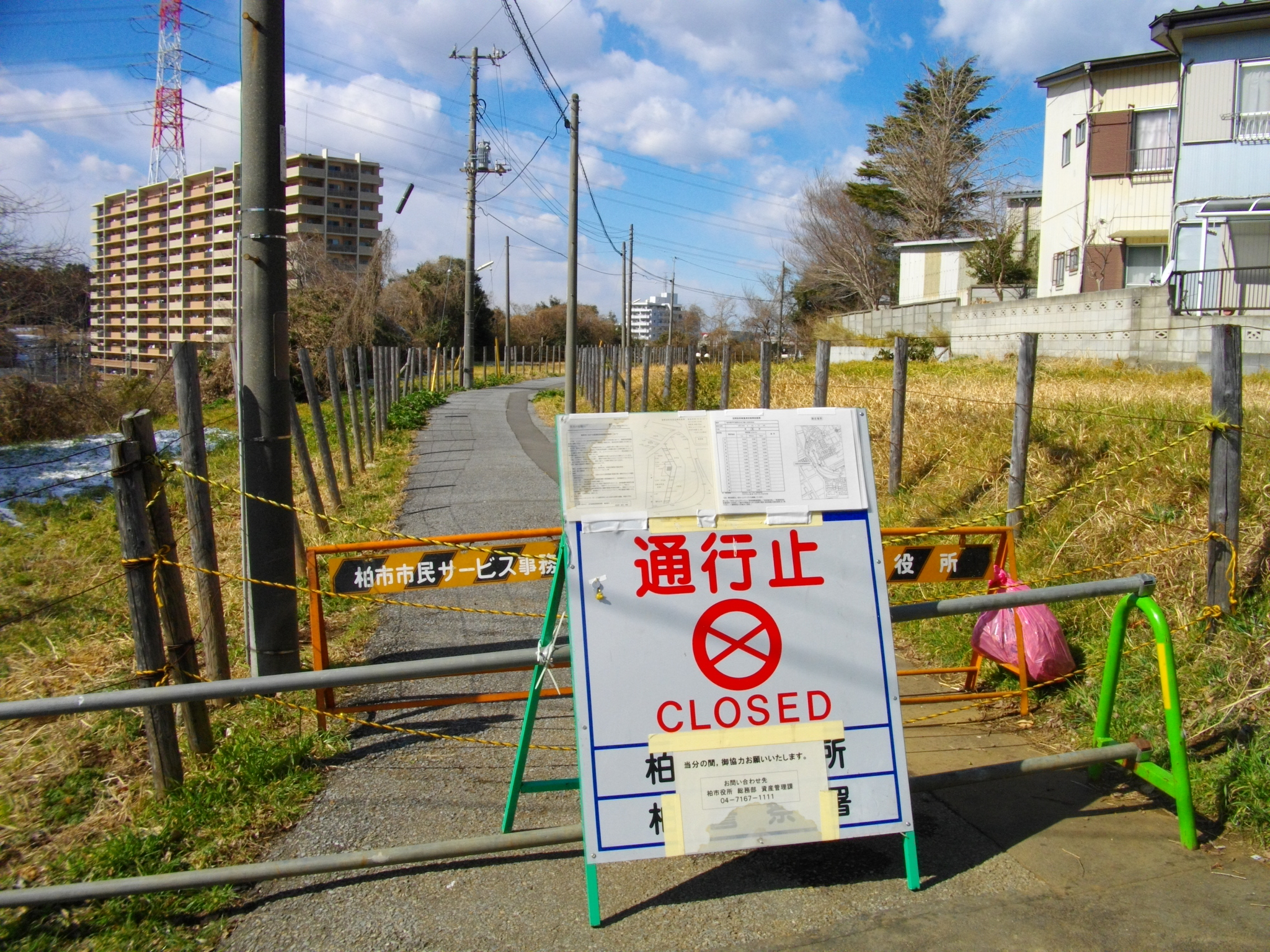
Radiation hotspot in Kashiwa, February 2012

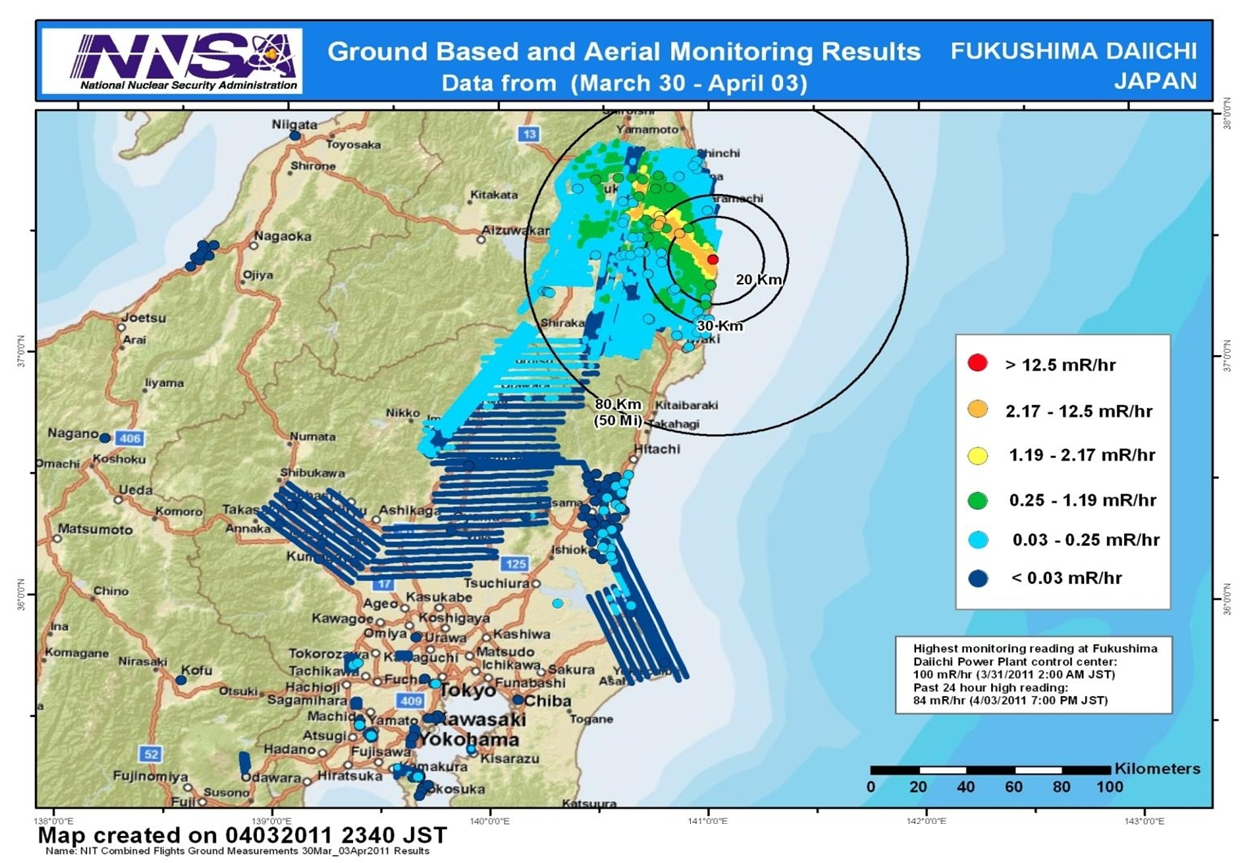
Map of contaminated areas around the plant (22 March – 3 April 2011)

Japan towns, villages, and cities in and around the Daiichi nuclear plant exclusion zone. The 20 and 30 km (12 and 19 mi) areas had evacuation and shelter in place orders, and additional administrative districts that had an evacuation order are highlighted.

In response to the station blackout during the initial hours of the accident and the ongoing uncertainty regarding the cooling status of units 1 and 2, a 2 km radius evacuation of 1,900 residents was ordered at 20:50. However, due to difficulty coordinating with the national government, a 3 km evacuation order of ~6,000 residents and a 10 km shelter-in-place order for 45,000 residents was established nearly simultaneously at 21:23. The evacuation radius was expanded to 10 km at 5:44, and was then revised to 20 km at 18:25. The size of these evacuation zones was set for arbitrary reasons at the discretion of bureaucrats rather than nuclear experts. Communication between different authorities was scattered and at several times the local governments learned the status of evacuation via the televised news media. Citizens were informed by radio, trucks with megaphones, and door to door visits. Many municipalities independently ordered evacuations ahead of orders from the national government due to loss of communication with authorities; at the time of the 3 km evacuation order, the majority of residents within the zone had already evacuated.

Due to the multiple overlapping evacuation orders, many residents had evacuated to areas which would shortly be designated as evacuation areas. This resulted in many residents having to move multiple times until they reached an area outside of the final 20 km evacuation zone. 20% of residents who were within the initial 2 km radius had to evacuate more than six times.

Additionally, a 30 km shelter in place order was communicated on the 15th, although some municipalities within this zone had already decided to evacuate their residents. This order was followed by a voluntary evacuation recommendation on the 25th, although the majority of residents had evacuated from the 30 km zone by then. The shelter in place order was lifted on 22 April, but the evacuation recommendation remained.

==== Fatalities ====
Of an estimated 2,220 patients and elderly who resided within hospitals and nursing homes within the 20 mi (32 km) evacuation zone, 51 fatalities are attributed to the evacuation. According to Dr. Arifumi Hasegawa (a leading expert in radiation disaster medicine), hypothermia, deterioration of underlying medical problems, and dehydration were suspected as the causes of death. The lack of medical support before, during and after the evacuation was regarded as the major reason for the loss of life during the evacuation. The Fukushima accident underscored critical issues regarding the evacuation of hospitals and nursing care facilities.

One worker at the power plant died 4 years later of lung cancer, having been exposed to 74 mSv since the accident. For comparison, a full body CT scan can give doses between 50 and 100 mSv. However Geraldine Thomas claimed "there is a vanishingly small chance that this man's lung cancer was as a result of the radiation he was exposed to".

==== Communication failures ====
The Japanese public felt that the government and TEPCO provided limited information about the accident in the early weeks. Expert analysis of the accident that was understandable to lay-persons was not given by the government or TEPCO, but by Masashi Gotō, a retired reactor vessel designer at Toshiba, the company that manufactured four of the six reactor units. Gotō had a series of press briefings at the Foreign Correspondents' Club of Japan starting from 14 March 2011.

There were several instances early in the accident response in which data about the accident was not properly handled. The Ministry of Education, Culture, Sports, Science and Technology (MEXT) only sent data from the SPEEDI network to the Fukushima prefectural government and was later criticized for delaying the communication of data to the U.S. military. Additionally, the U.S. military produced a detailed map using aircraft and provided it to the Ministry of Economy, Trade and Industry (METI) on 18 March and to MEXT two days later, but no new evacuation plans were made a week after the accident. The data was not forwarded to the Nuclear Safety Commission, but was made public by the United States on the 23rd.

TEPCO officials were instructed not to use the phrase "core meltdown" in order to conceal the meltdown until they officially recognized it two months after the accident.

The Japanese government did not keep records of key meetings during the crisis. Emails from the Nuclear and Industrial Safety Agency to the Fukushima prefectural government, including evacuation and health advisories from 12 March 23:54 to 16 March 09:00, went unread and were deleted.

==== Mental health and evacuation side effects ====
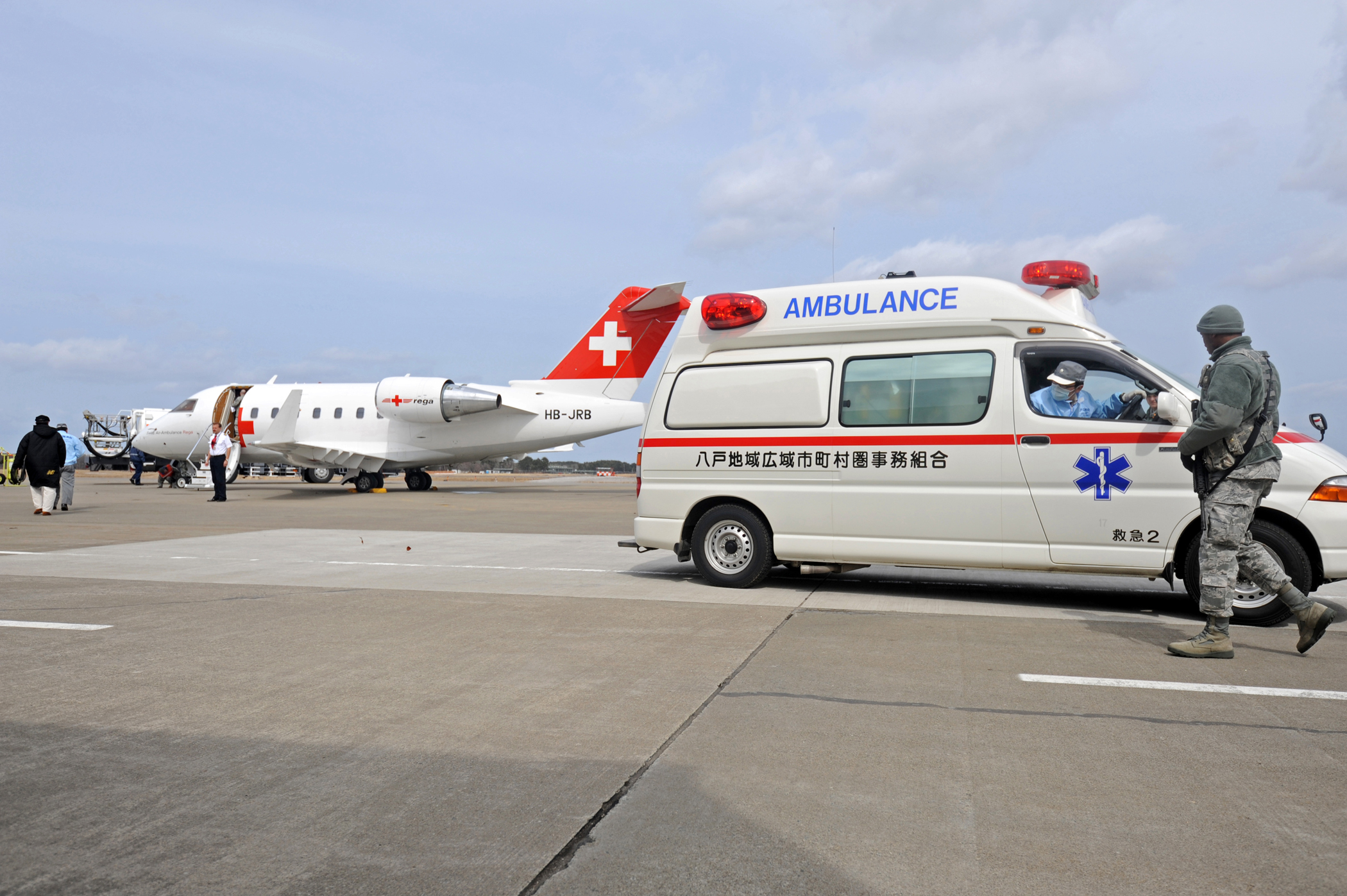
Evacuation flight departs Misawa.

In January 2015, the number of residents displaced due to the accident was around 119,000, peaking at 164,000 in June 2012. In terms of months of life lost, the loss of life would have been far smaller if all residents had done nothing at all, or were sheltered in place, instead of evacuated.

In the former Soviet Union, many patients with negligible radioactive exposure after the Chernobyl accident displayed extreme anxiety about radiation exposure. They developed many psychosomatic problems, including radiophobia along with an increase in fatalistic alcoholism. As Japanese health and radiation specialist Shunichi Yamashita noted:

We know from Chernobyl that the psychological consequences are enormous. Life expectancy of the evacuees dropped from 65 to 58 years – not because of cancer, but because of depression, alcoholism, and suicide. Relocation is not easy, the stress is very big. We must not only track those problems, but also treat them. Otherwise people will feel they are just guinea pigs in our research.

A 2012 survey by the Iitate local government obtained responses from approximately 1,743 evacuees within the evacuation zone. The survey showed that many residents were experiencing growing frustration, instability, and an inability to return to their earlier lives. Sixty percent of respondents stated that their health and the health of their families had deteriorated after evacuating, while 39.9% reported feeling more irritated compared to before the accident.

Summarizing all responses to questions related to evacuees' current family status, one-third of all surveyed families live apart from their children, while 50.1% live away from other family members (including elderly parents) with whom they lived before the disaster. The survey also showed that 34.7% of the evacuees have suffered salary cuts of 50% or more since the outbreak of the nuclear disaster. A total of 36.8% reported a lack of sleep, while 17.9% reported smoking or drinking more than before they evacuated.

Stress often manifests. A 2014 metareview of 48 articles indexed by PubMed, PsycINFO, and EMBASE, highlighted several psychophysical consequences among the residents in Miyagi, Iwate, Ibaraki, Tochigi and Tokyo. The metareview found mass fear among Fukushima residents which was associated with depressive symptoms, anxiety, sleep disturbance, post-traumatic stress disorder, maternal distress, and distress among the employees of the nuclear plant. The rates of psychological distress among evacuated people rose fivefold compared to the Japanese average due to the experience of the accident and evacuation. An increase in childhood obesity in the area after the accident has also been attributed to recommendations that children stay indoors instead of going outside to play.

=== Energy policy ===
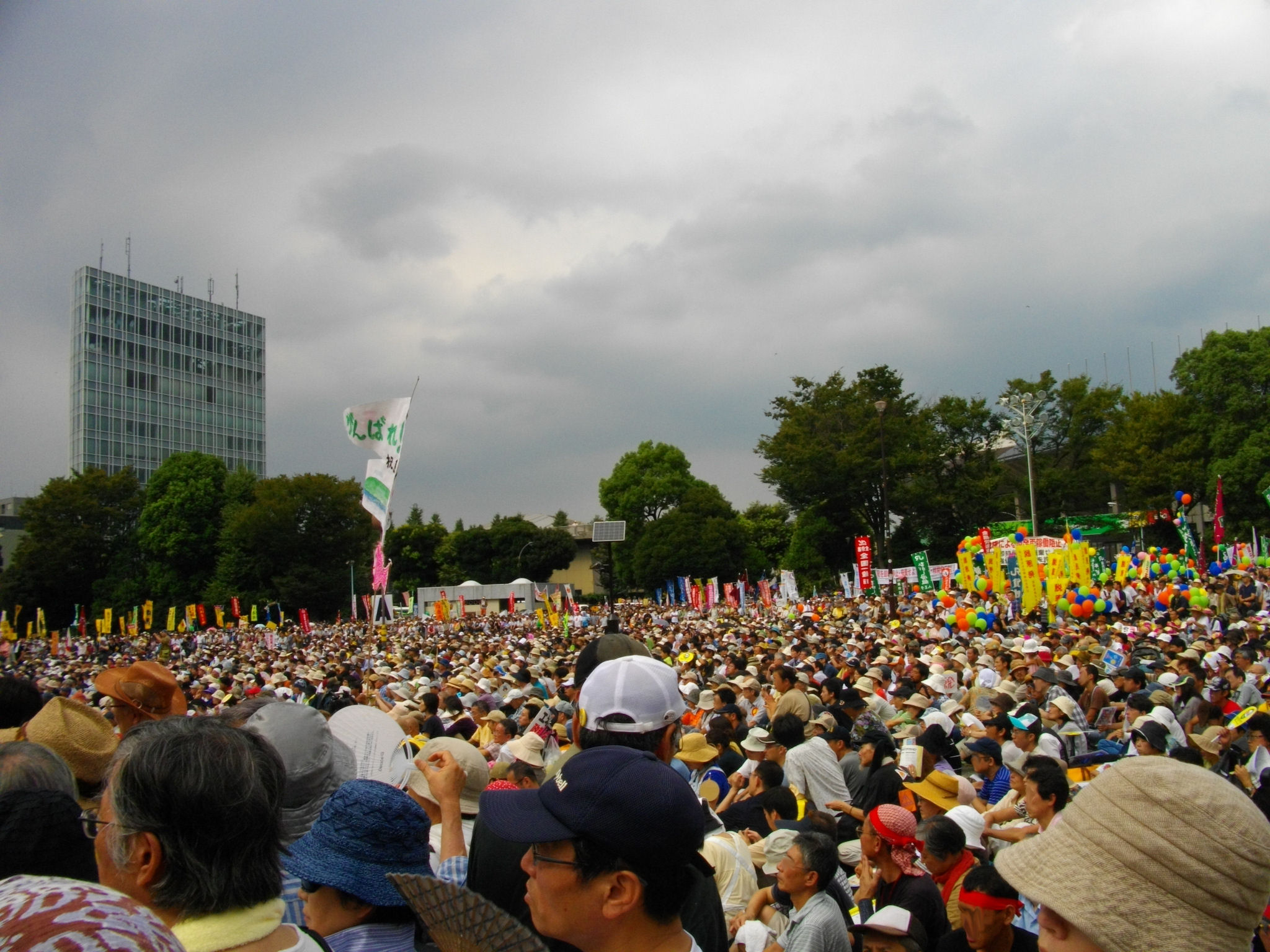
Anti-nuclear power plant rally on 19 September 2011 at the Meiji Shrine complex in Tokyo

Prior to the accident, over 25% of domestic electricity generation in Japan used nuclear power and Japan had set a fairly ambitious greenhouse gas (GHG) reduction target of 25% below 1990 levels by 2020, which involved increasing the share of nuclear power in electricity generation from 30% to 50%. However, this plan was abandoned and the target was revised to a 5.2% emissions increase by 2020 following the accident, alongside a focus on reducing dependence on nuclear power in favor of improved thermal efficiency in fossil fuel energy use and increasing the share of "renewables". The contribution of nuclear energy dropped to less than one percent following the accident and all nuclear reactors in the country were shut down by 2013. This resulted in an increase in the share of fossil fuel energy use, which had increased to ~94% by 2015 (the highest of any IEA member state, with the remaining ~6% produced by renewables, an increase from 4% in 2010). The required fossil fuel imports in 2011 resulted in a trade deficit for the first time in decades which would continue in the following decade.

In the immediate aftermath, nine prefectures served by TEPCO experienced power rationing. The government asked major companies to reduce power consumption by 15%, and some shifted their work hours to smooth power demand. As of 2013, TEPCO and eight other Japanese power companies were paying approximately 3.6 trillion JPY (37 billion USD) more in combined imported fossil fuel costs compared to 2010 to make up for the missing power.

==== Elections ====
On 16 December 2012, Japan held a general election. The Liberal Democratic Party (LDP) had a clear victory, with Shinzō Abe as the new Prime Minister. Abe supported nuclear power, saying that leaving the plants closed was costing the country 4 trillion yen per year in higher costs. The comment came after Junichiro Koizumi, who chose Abe to succeed him as premier, made a statement to urge the government to take a stance against using nuclear power. A survey on local mayors by the Yomiuri Shimbun newspaper in 2013 found that most of them from cities hosting nuclear plants would agree to restarting the reactors, provided the government could guarantee their safety. More than 30,000 people marched on 2 June 2013, in Tokyo against restarting nuclear power plants. Marchers had gathered more than 8 million petition signatures opposing nuclear power.

Previously a proponent of building more reactors, Prime Minister Naoto Kan took an increasingly anti-nuclear stance following the accident. In May 2011, he ordered the aging Hamaoka Nuclear Power Plant closed over earthquake and tsunami concerns, and said he would freeze building plans. In July 2011, Kan said, "Japan should reduce and eventually eliminate its dependence on nuclear energy".

==== International impact ====
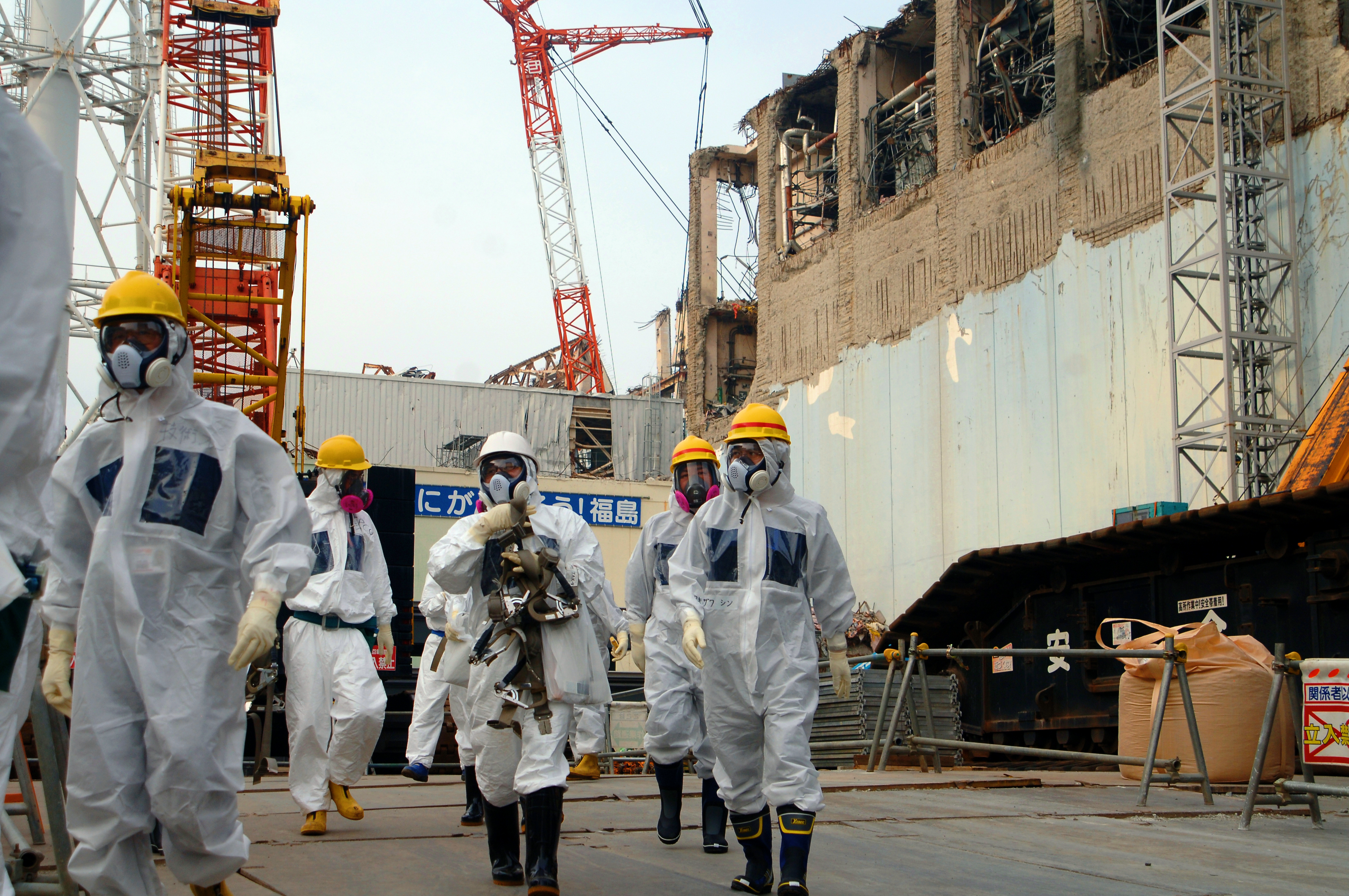
IAEA experts at Unit 4, 2013

In May 2011, UK chief inspector of nuclear installations Mike Weightman traveled to Japan as the lead of an International Atomic Energy Agency (IAEA) expert mission. The main finding of this mission, as reported to the IAEA ministerial conference that month, was that risks associated with tsunamis in several sites in Japan had been underestimated.

In September 2011, IAEA Director General Yukiya Amano said the Japanese nuclear disaster "caused deep public anxiety throughout the world and damaged confidence in nuclear power". Following the accident, the IAEA halved its estimate of additional nuclear generating capacity to be built by 2035.

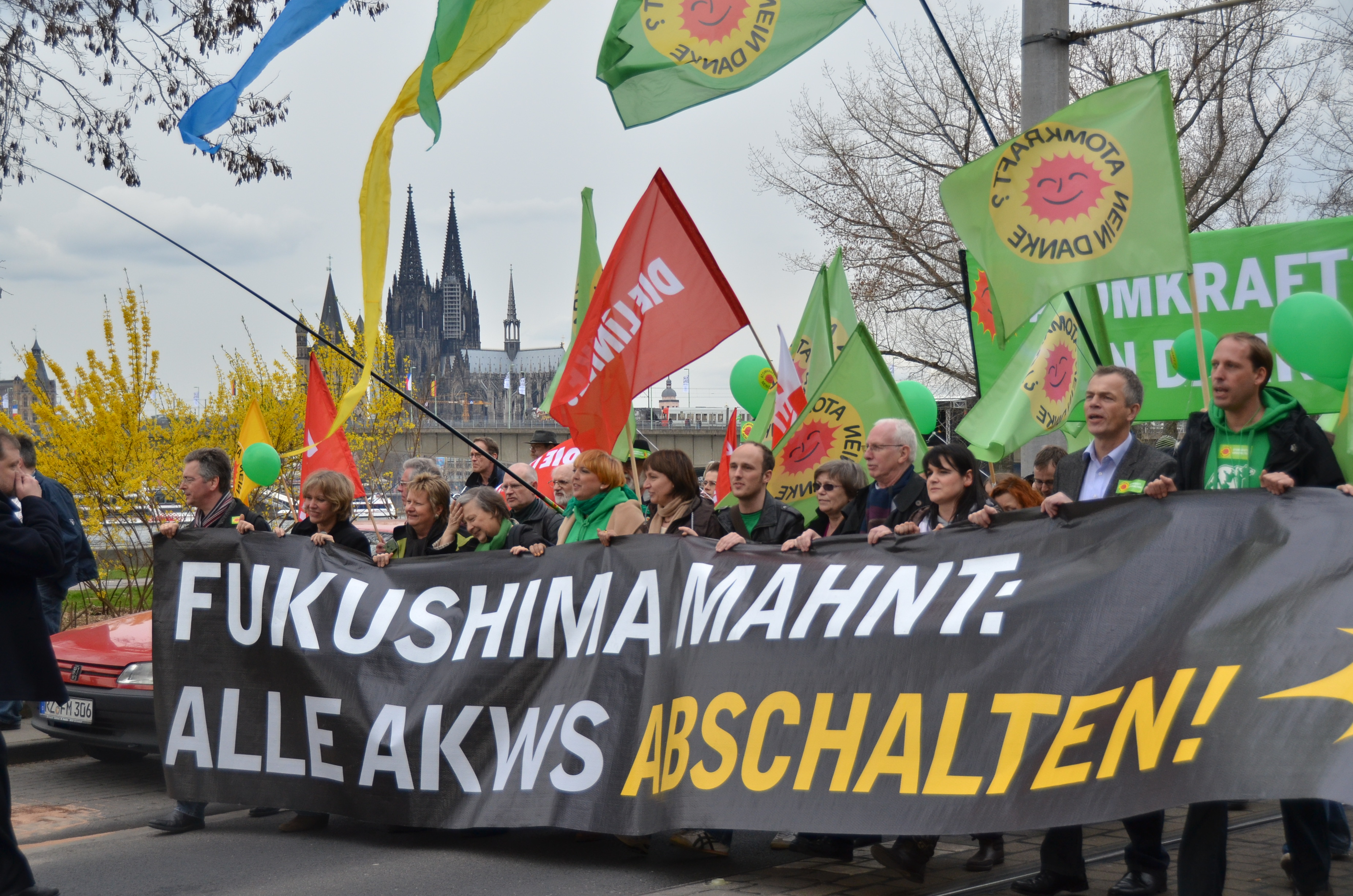
Protest against nuclear power in Cologne, Germany, on 26 March 2011

In the aftermath, Germany accelerated plans to close its nuclear power reactors and decided to phase out the rest by 2022. German media coverage conflated the casualties of the earthquake and tsunami with casualties of the nuclear incident. Belgium and Switzerland also changed their nuclear policies to phase-out all nuclear energy operations, but have undone these plans since. Italy held a national referendum, in which 94 percent voted against the government's plan to build new nuclear power plants. In France, President Hollande announced the intention of the government to reduce nuclear usage by one third. However, the government earmarked only one power station for closure – the aging Fessenheim Nuclear Power Plant on the German border – which prompted some to question the government's commitment to Hollande's promise. Industry Minister Arnaud Montebourg stated Fessenheim will be the only nuclear power station to close. On a visit to China in December 2014 he reassured his audience that nuclear energy was a "sector of the future" and would continue to contribute "at least 50%" of France's electricity output. Another member of Hollande's Socialist Party, Christian Bataille, said that Hollande announced the nuclear curb to secure the backing of his Green coalition partners in parliament.

China continued developing nuclear power in the decade following. In 2015, China had hoped to have 400–500 gigawatts of nuclear capacity by 2050 – 100 times more than it had in 2015.

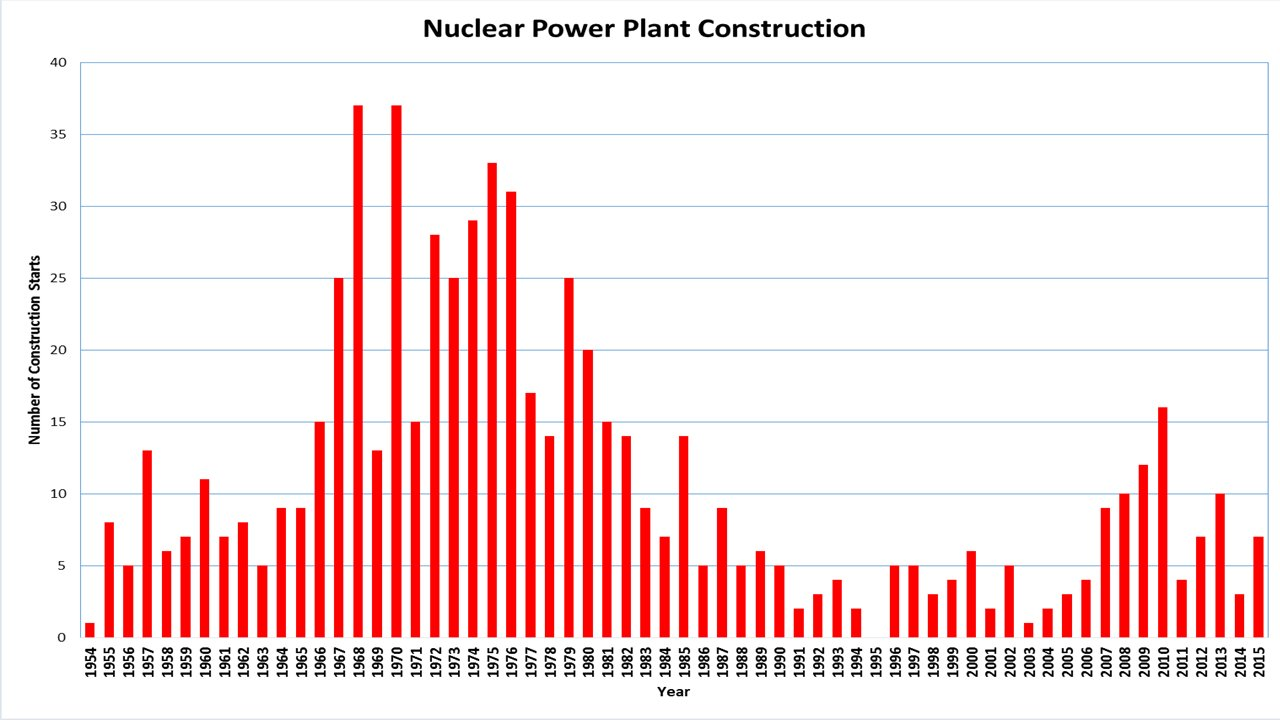
The number of nuclear power plant constructions started each year worldwide, from 1954 to 2013. Following an increase in new constructions from 2007 to 2010, there was a decline after the Fukushima nuclear accident.

New nuclear projects were proceeding in some countries. The consulting firm KPMG reported in 2018 that 653 new nuclear facilities were planned or proposed for completion by 2030. In 2019, the United Kingdom was planning a major nuclear expansion despite some public objection. Russia had similar plans. In 2015, India was also pressing ahead with a large nuclear program, as was South Korea. Indian Vice President M. Hamid Ansari said in 2012 that "nuclear energy is the only option" for expanding India's energy supplies, and Prime Minister Modi announced in 2014 that India intended to build 10 more nuclear reactors in a collaboration with Russia.

Nuclear power generation in India
Year	Generation (TWh)
2010	23.0
2011	32.3
2012	33.1
2013	33.3
2014	34.7
2015	38.4
2016	38.0

In Chile, a seismic country like Japan, the accident contributed to dissipate early plans to develop nuclear power and contributed instead to increase the support for the development of solar power in Atacama Desert.

=== Radiation effects in humans ===
Coastal seawater contamination by caesium-137, from 21 March until 5 May 2011

Radiation exposure of those living in proximity to the accident site was estimated at 12–25 millisieverts (mSv) in the year following the accident. Residents of Fukushima City were estimated to have received 4 mSv in the same time period. In comparison, the dosage of background radiation received over a lifetime is 170 mSv. Very few or no detectable cancers are expected as a result of accumulated radiation exposure. Residents who were evacuated were exposed to so little radiation that radiation-induced health effects were likely to be below detectable levels. There was no increase in miscarriages, stillbirths or physical and mental disorders in babies born after the accident.

Outside the geographical areas most affected by radiation, even in locations within Fukushima prefecture, the predicted risks remain low, and no observable increases in cancer above natural variation in baseline rates are anticipated.

— World Health Organization, 2013

Estimated effective doses outside Japan are considered to be below (or far below) the levels regarded as very small by the international radiological protection community. Canadian academic studies failed to show any significant amount of radiation in the coastal waters off Canada's west coast. The report's author received death threats from supporters promoting the idea of a "wave of cancer deaths across North America".

The World Health Organization (WHO), United Nations (UN), and researchers from other groups were particularly concerned about thyroid cancer as a result of the radiation. In January 2022, six such patients who were kids at the time of the accident sued TEPCO for 616 million yen after developing thyroid cancer. The scientific consensus suggests that the increase in detectable thyroid cancer fell within statistical background noise due to the screening effect, and that the cancers did not have chromosomal aberrations consistent with exposure to ionizing radiation, except for that caused by CT scans.

Leukemia, breast cancer, and other solid cancers were studied by the WHO. Increase in lifetime cancer relative to baseline risk for infants was reported because these represent an upper bound for the cancer related health risks. The WHO notes that a large increase in thyroid cancer is partially due to extremely low baseline rates.

Cancer type	Risk increase relative to baseline
All solid cancers	4%
Leukemia	7%
Thyroid cancer	70%

==== Linear no-threshold models (LNT) ====
LNT models estimate that the accident would most likely cause 130 cancer deaths. However, LNT models have large uncertainties and are not useful for estimating health effects from radiation, especially when the effects of radiation on the human body are not linear, and with obvious thresholds. The WHO reports that the radiation levels from the accident were below the thresholds for deterministic effects from radiation.

=== Radiation effects in non-humans ===
On 21 March 2011, the first restrictions were placed on the distribution and consumption of contaminated items. However, the results of measurements of both the seawater and the coastal sediments led to the supposition that the consequences of the accident, in terms of radioactivity, would be minor for marine life as of autumn 2011. Despite caesium isotopic concentrations in the waters off Japan being 10 to 1000 times above the normal concentrations prior to the accident, radiation risks are below what is generally considered harmful to marine animals and human consumers.

Marine life has been tested for cesium and other radionuclides since the accident. These studies found elevated levels of cesium in marine life from 2011 to 2015. Migratory pelagic species are also highly effective and rapid transporters of pollutants throughout the ocean. Elevated levels of Cs-134 appeared in migratory species off the coast of California that were not seen prior to the accident.

In April 2014, studies confirmed the presence of radioactive tuna off the coasts of the Pacific U.S. Researchers carried out tests on 26 albacore tuna caught prior to the 2011 power plant accident and those caught after. However, the amount of radioactivity is less than that found naturally in a single banana. Cs-137 and Cs-134 have been noted in Japanese whiting in Tokyo Bay as of 2016. "Concentration of radiocesium in the Japanese whiting was one or two orders of magnitude higher than that in the sea water, and an order of magnitude lower than that in the sediment." They were still within food safety limits.

In June 2016, the political advocacy group International Physicians for the Prevention of Nuclear War, asserted that 174,000 people have been unable to return to their homes and ecological diversity has decreased and malformations have been found in trees, birds, and mammals. Although physiological abnormalities have been reported within the vicinity of the accident zone, the scientific community has largely rejected any such findings of genetic or mutagenic damage caused by radiation, instead showing it can be attributed either to experimental error or other toxic effects.

In February 2018, Japan renewed the export of fish caught off Fukushima's nearshore zone. According to prefecture officials, no seafood had been found with radiation levels exceeding Japan safety standards since April 2015. In 2018, Thailand was the first country to receive a shipment of fresh fish from Japan's Fukushima prefecture. A group campaigning to help prevent global warming has demanded the Food and Drug Administration disclose the name of the importer of fish from Fukushima and of the Japanese restaurants in Bangkok serving it. Srisuwan Janya, chairman of the Stop Global Warming Association, said the FDA must protect the rights of consumers by ordering restaurants serving Fukushima fish to make that information available to their customers, so they could decide whether to eat it or not.

In February 2022, Japan suspended the sale of black rockfish from Fukushima after it was discovered that one fish from Soma had 180 times more radioactive Cesium-137 than legally permitted. The high levels of radioactivity led investigators to believe it had escaped from a breakwater at the accident site, despite nets intended to prevent fish from leaving the area. Forty-four other fish from the accident site have shown similar levels.

=== Radiation effects in agriculture ===
On 20 March 2011, the radioactivity of vegetables produced in six prefectures in the Kanto and Tohoku regions exceeded provisional regulation values. The government subsequently prohibited Fukushima, Ibaraki, Tochigi and Gunma prefectures from shipping vegetables in which radioactive materials exceeding provisional regulation values had been detected. Additionally, the Federal Office for Radiation Protection found that foodstuffs were contaminated by radioactive material that was deposited on the leaves or directly on agricultural produce, such as fruit and vegetables, or that was absorbed via the roots of fruit and vegetables.

Considering the use of land for crop cultivation, radiocesium concentration in the top layer of the soil had to be evaluated. Without disturbance of soil surface, radiocesium was accumulated within about 5 cm of the soil surface, which could affect food safety. The authors found that the agri-food industry in Fukushima Prefecture has been heavily impacted, with serious negative effects extending to other regions and the national food supply. Agricultural damage has been particularly severe near the nuclear plant, where farming and related activities have been halted or reduced, affecting 8% of local farmers and 9% of the prefecture's farmland. Much of the long-term harm to farmers' livelihoods, property, physical and mental health, the environment, and community connections cannot be measured quantitatively. After 2011, the hectares of cultivated land decreased by 10,000 on a Fukushima prefecture in Japan. Ten years later, radioactive topsoil still exists on large swaths of the land. The number of farmers has also decreased as 30,000 fewer people claim farming as their primary income source because of radioactive contamination. In general, concerns over the safety of Fukushima agricultural products have widened the economic gap between urban and rural areas, exacerbating social imbalances and unrest across Japan.

Agri-food radiation regulation and food safety inspection in Japan prior to the accident were sparse, and have been characterized as inadequate. Provisional regulatory limits for radionuclides in agri-food products were introduced after Fukushima. These became the world's strictest in 2012.

== Investigations ==
Three investigations into the accident showed the man-made nature of the catastrophe and its roots in regulatory capture associated with a "network of corruption, collusion, and nepotism." A New York Times report found that the Japanese nuclear regulatory system consistently sided with, and promoted, the nuclear industry based on the concept of amakudari ('descent from heaven'), in which senior regulators accepted high paying jobs at companies they once oversaw.

In August 2011, several top energy officials were fired from their jobs by the Japanese government; affected positions included the Vice-minister for Economy, Trade and Industry; the head of the Nuclear and Industrial Safety Agency, and the head of the Agency for Natural Resources and Energy.

In 2016 three former TEPCO executives, chairman Tsunehisa Katsumata and two vice presidents, were indicted for negligence resulting in death and injury. The three pleaded not guilty, and in September 2019, the court agreed.

=== NAIIC ===
The Fukushima Nuclear Accident Independent Investigation Commission (NAIIC) was the first independent investigation commission by the National Diet in the 66-year history of Japan's constitutional government.

The chairman highlighted that it was foreseeable and preventable. The commission's findings included that the government and TEPCO lacked the sense that they were the ones responsible for protecting society. "They effectively betrayed the nation's right to be safe from nuclear accidents." The commission argued that the accident had particularly Japanese characteristics because its causes were linked to "conventions of Japanese culture" such as obedience, "reluctance to question authority", and groupism.

The Commission recognized that the affected residents were still struggling and facing grave concerns, including the "health effects of radiation exposure, displacement, the dissolution of families, disruption of their lives and lifestyles and the contamination of vast areas of the environment".

=== ICANPS ===
The purpose of the Investigation Committee on the Accident at the Fukushima Nuclear Power Stations (ICANPS) was to identify the accident's causes and propose policies designed to minimize the damage and prevent the recurrence of similar incidents. The 10 member, government-appointed panel included scholars, journalists, lawyers, and engineers. It was supported by public prosecutors and government experts and released its final 448-page investigation report on 23 July 2012.

The panel's report faulted an inadequate legal system for nuclear crisis management, a crisis-command disarray caused by the government and TEPCO, and possible excess meddling on the part of Prime Minister Naoto Kan's office in the crisis' early stage. The panel concluded that a culture of complacency about nuclear safety and poor crisis management led to the nuclear accident.

== Remediation and recovery ==
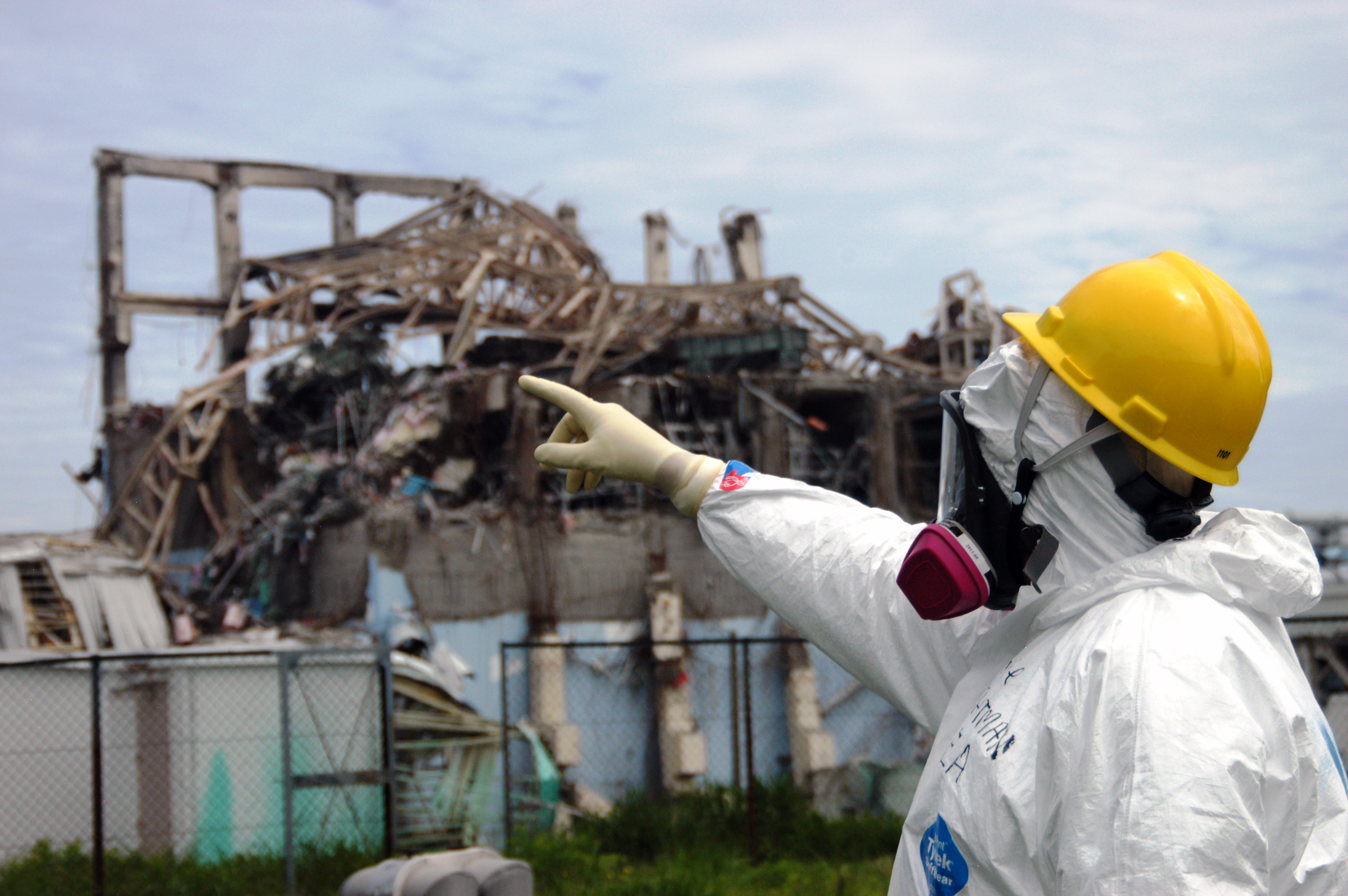
IAEA team examining Unit 3

To assuage fears, the government enacted an order to decontaminate over a hundred areas where the level of additional radiation was greater than one millisievert per year. This is a much lower threshold than is necessary for protecting health. The government also sought to address the lack of education on the effects of radiation and the extent to which the average person was exposed.

In 2018, tours to visit the accident area began. In September 2020, The Great East Japan Earthquake and Nuclear Disaster Memorial Museum was opened in the town of Futaba, near the power plant. The museum exhibits items and videos about the earthquake and the nuclear accident. To attract visitors from abroad, the museum offers explanations in English, Chinese, and Korean.

=== Fuel removal ===
TEPCO plans to remove the remaining nuclear fuel material from the plants. TEPCO completed the removal of 1535 fuel assemblies from the Unit 4 spent fuel pool in December 2014 and 566 fuel assemblies from the Unit 3 spent fuel pool in February 2021. TEPCO plans to remove all fuel rods from the spent fuel pools of Units 1, 2, 5, and 6 by 2037 and to remove the remaining molten fuel debris from the reactor containments of Units 1, 2, and 3 by about 2050. Plant management estimated the ongoing intensive cleanup program to both decontaminate affected areas and decommission the plant will take 30 to 40 years from the accident.

=== Treating contaminated water ===
As of 2013, about 400 metric tons (390 long tons; 440 short tons) of cooling water per day was being pumped into the reactors. Another 400 metric tons (390 long tons; 440 short tons) of groundwater was seeping into the structure. Some 800 metric tons (790 long tons; 880 short tons) of water per day was removed for treatment, half of which was reused for cooling and half diverted to storage tanks. Ultimately the contaminated water, after treatment to remove radionuclides other than tritium, has to be discharged into the Pacific Ocean. TEPCO created an underground ice wall to block the flow of groundwater into the reactor buildings. A $300 million 7.8 MW cooling facility freezes the ground to a depth of 30 meters. As of 2019, the contaminated water generation had been reduced to 170 metric tons (170 long tons; 190 short tons) per day.

In February 2014, NHK reported that TEPCO was reviewing its radioactivity data, after finding much higher levels of radioactivity than was reported earlier. Groundwater collected in July 2013 contained 5 MBq (0.12 millicuries) of strontium per liter (23 MBq/imp gal; 19 MBq/U.S. gal; 610 μCi/imp gal; 510 μCi/U.S. gal) not the 0.9 MBq (0.02 millicuries) (4.1 MBq/imp gal; 3.4 MBq/U.S. gal; 110 μCi/imp gal; 92 μCi/U.S. gal) that were initially reported.

On 10 September 2015, floodwaters driven by Typhoon Etau prompted mass evacuations in Japan and overwhelmed the drainage pumps at the stricken power plant. Hundreds of metric tons of radioactive water entered the ocean as a result. Plastic bags filled with contaminated soil and grass were also swept away by the flood waters.

As of October 2019, 1.17 million cubic meters of contaminated water was stored in the plant area. The water is being treated by a purification system that can remove radionuclides, except tritium, to a level that Japanese regulations allow to be discharged to the sea. As of December 2019, 28% of the water had been purified to the required level, while the remaining 72% needed additional purification. However, tritium cannot be separated from the water. As of October 2019, the total amount of tritium in the water was about 856 terabecquerels, and the average tritium concentration was about 0.73 MBq per liter.

A 2020 committee set up by the Japanese Government concluded that the purified water should be released to the sea or evaporated to the atmosphere. The committee calculated that discharging all the water to the sea in one year would cause a radiation dose of 0.81 microsieverts to the local people, whereas evaporation would cause 1.2 microsieverts. For comparison, Japanese people get 2100 microsieverts per year from natural radiation. IAEA considers that the dose calculation method is appropriate. Further, the IAEA recommended that a decision on the water disposal must be made urgently. Despite the negligible doses, the Japanese committee is concerned that the water disposal may cause reputational damage to the prefecture, especially to the fishing industry and to tourism.

In 2021, Japan's Nuclear Regulation Authority warned that the some of 3,373 waste storage containers for the radioactive slurry were degrading faster than expected. Due to the fact that transferring the slurry to a new container was very time-consuming, this posed an urgent problem.

Tanks used to store the water were expected to be filled in 2023. In July 2022, Japan's Nuclear Regulation Authority approved discharging the treated water into the sea. Japan said the water is safe, many scientists agreed, and the decision came weeks after the UN's nuclear watchdog approved the plan; but critics say more studies need to be done and the release should be halted. In August, Japan began the discharge of treated waste water into the Pacific Ocean, sparking protests in the region and retaliation from China, who blocked all imports of seafood from Japan. Discharges were planned to occur over the subsequent 30 years to release all the water. A US State Department spokesperson supported the decision. South Korea's foreign minister and activists from Japan and South Korea protested the announcement. In April 2023, fishers and activists held protests in front of the Japanese embassy in the Philippines in opposition to the planned release of 1.3 million tons of treated water into the Pacific Ocean.

Xiaoqi Zhou, an environmental sciences scholar, found that more than 60 radioactive substances have been detected in the Fukushima nuclear wastewater, such as ^{106}Ru, ^{60}Co, ^{90}Sr, ^{137}Cs and ^{131}I. Some of these radioactive isotopes are relatively volatile fission products that can be released into the atmosphere. These particles could adhere to both the leaves and stems of plants, as well as bind firmly to clay minerals in the soil, resulting in their prolonged retention in the terrestrial ecosystems. Eventually, they can enter groundwater through rainfall and flow into the ocean. Zhou found that compared with terrestrial radioactive elements, the release of radioactive elements from the Fukushima nuclear wastewater into the ocean spreads more rapidly with ocean currents, which increases their potential to harm marine species—and, by extension, human health.

=== Compensation and government expenses ===
Initial estimates of costs to Japanese taxpayers were in excess of ¥12 trillion ($120 billion inflation adjusted). In December 2016 the government estimated decontamination, compensation, decommissioning, and radioactive waste storage costs at ¥21.5 trillion ($220 billion inflation adjusted), nearly double the 2013 estimate. By 2022, ¥12.1 trillion had already been spent, with ¥7 trillion on compensation, ¥3 trillion on decontamination, and ¥2 trillion on decommissioning and storage. Despite concerns, the government expected total costs to remain under budget.

In March 2017, a Japanese court ruled that negligence by the Japanese government had led to the Fukushima accident by failing to use its regulatory powers to force TEPCO to take preventive measures. The Maebashi district court near Tokyo awarded ¥39 million ($390,000 inflation adjusted) to 137 people who were forced to flee their homes following the accident. On 30 September 2020, the Sendai High Court ruled that the Japanese government and TEPCO are responsible for the accident, ordering them to pay $9.5 million in damages to residents for their lost livelihoods. In March 2022, Japan's Supreme Court rejected an appeal from TEPCO and upheld the order for it to pay damages of ¥1.4 billion ($12 million) to about 3,700 people whose lives were harmed by the accident. Its decision covered three class-action lawsuits, among more than 30 filed against the utility.

On 17 June 2022, the Supreme Court acquitted the government of any wrongdoing regarding potential compensation to over 3,700 people affected by the accident.

On 13 July 2022, four former TEPCO executives were ordered to pay ¥13 trillion ($95 billion) in damages to the operator of the power plant, in the civil case brought by TEPCO shareholders.

=== Equipment, facility, and operational changes ===
A number of nuclear reactor safety system lessons emerged from the incident. The most obvious was that in tsunami-prone areas, a power station's sea wall must be adequately tall and robust. At the Onagawa Nuclear Power Plant, closer to the epicenter of the 11 March 2011 earthquake and tsunami, the sea wall was 14 meters (46 ft) tall and successfully withstood the tsunami, preventing serious damage and radioactivity releases.

Nuclear power station operators around the world began to install passive autocatalytic recombiners ("PARs"), which do not require electricity to operate. PARs work much like the catalytic converter on the exhaust of a car to turn potentially explosive gases such as hydrogen into water. Had such devices been positioned at the top of the reactor buildings, where hydrogen gas collected, the explosions would not have occurred and the releases of radioactive isotopes may have been less.

Unpowered filtering systems on containment building vent lines, known as Filtered Containment Venting Systems (FCVS), can safely catch radioactive materials and thereby allow reactor core depressurization, with steam and hydrogen venting with minimal radioactivity emissions. Filtration using an external water tank system is the most common established system in European countries, with the water tank positioned outside the containment building. In 2013, TEPCO installed additional filters, vents, and other safety systems at Kashiwazaki-Kariwa Nuclear Power Plant.

For Generation II reactors located in flood or tsunami prone areas, a 3+ day supply of back-up batteries has become an informal industry standard. Another change is to harden the location of back-up diesel generator rooms with water-tight, blast-resistant doors and heat sinks, similar to those used by nuclear submarines.

Upon a station blackout, similar to the one that occurred after the back-up battery supply was exhausted, many constructed Generation III reactors adopt the principle of passive nuclear safety. They take advantage of convection and gravity to ensure an adequate supply of cooling water to handle the decay heat, without the use of pumps.

As the crisis unfolded, the Japanese government sent a request for robots developed by the U.S. military. The robots went into the plants and took pictures to help assess the situation, but they could not perform the full range of tasks usually carried out by human workers. The accident illustrated that robots lacked sufficient dexterity and robustness to perform critical tasks. In response to this shortcoming, a series of competitions were hosted by DARPA to accelerate the development of humanoid robots that could supplement relief efforts. Eventually a wide variety of specially designed robots were employed (leading to a robotics boom in the region), but as of early 2016, three of them had promptly become non-functional due to the intensity of the radioactivity.

== Prior warning ==
On 5 July 2012, the NAIIC found that the causes of the accident had been foreseeable, and that TEPCO had failed to meet basic safety requirements such as risk assessment, preparing for containing collateral damage, and developing evacuation plans. At a meeting in Vienna, Austria, three months after the accident, the IAEA faulted lax oversight by the Japanese Ministry of Economy, Trade and Industry, saying the ministry faced an inherent conflict of interest as the government agency in charge of both regulating and promoting the nuclear power industry. On 12 October 2012, TEPCO admitted that it had failed to take necessary measures for fear of inviting lawsuits or protests against its nuclear plants. A renewed and amplified distrust in the government stimulated a wave of protests, through mass street protests, literature, and film. Additionally, other individuals, citizen groups, and non-profits in the Tohoku region pursued alternative routes to producing and disseminating radiation data so as to make contamination and its health impacts more visible to the public.

=== Tsunami studies ===
The U.S. Nuclear Regulatory Commission warned of a risk of losing emergency power in 1991 and the Nuclear and Industrial Safety Agency referred to that report in 2004, but took no action to mitigate the risk.

In 2000, an in-house TEPCO report recommended safety measures against seawater flooding, based on the potential of a 15 meters (49 ft) tsunami. TEPCO did not act due to concerns about creating anxieties over the safety of the nuclear power plant.

In 2002, the government earthquake research headquarters estimated that a tsunami up to 15.7 meters (52 ft) could hit the power station. These findings were supported by the cabinet office's own findings which stated that the 5.6 meters (18 ft) forecast by TEPCO did not cover the full range of possibility. TEPCO's in-house 2008 study identified an immediate need to better protect the facility from flooding by seawater which cited the 15.7 meters (52 ft) estimate from the 2002 study.

In 2009, the Active Fault and Earthquake Research Center urged TEPCO and the Nuclear and Industrial Safety Agency to revise their assumptions for possible tsunami heights upwards, based on his team's findings about the 869 Sanriku earthquake, but this was not seriously considered at the time.

=== Unit 1 EDG disabled by flooding in 1991 ===
On 30 October 1991, one of unit 1's EDGs failed as a result of a condensate coolant leak in the turbine building, as reported by former employees in December 2011. A TEPCO report in 2011 detailed that the room was flooded through a door and some holes for cables, but the power supply was not cut off by the flooding. An engineer reported to superiors the possibility that a tsunami could damage the generators. In response, TEPCO installed doors to prevent water from leaking into the generator rooms.

=== Venting systems ===
American nuclear scientists identified manually activated venting systems to be riskier than a passive approach five years prior to the accident. The venting system for unit 3 had several issues before its explosion. By 2011, new reactor designs used passive venting systems.

== See also ==
- Comparison of the Chernobyl and Fukushima nuclear accidents
- Environmental issues in Japan
- Fukushima disaster cleanup
- Fukushima Daiichi nuclear disaster casualties
- List of Japanese nuclear incidents
- List of civilian nuclear accidents
- Lists of nuclear disasters and radioactive incidents
- Nuclear power in Japan
- Nuclear power phase-out
