= National Diet of Japan Fukushima Nuclear Accident Independent Investigation Commission =

2011 investigation

National Diet of Japan Fukushima Nuclear Accident Independent Investigation Commission or NAIIC is the commission to investigate the background and cause of Fukushima Daiichi nuclear disaster formed by the statutory law enactment by Diet of Japan on 7 October 2011 and started with the first commissioning meeting was held in Fukushima City, Fukushima Prefecture. The commission is scheduled to issue the report in six months on investigation and to propose the policy to reduce and prevent future accident and reduce damage on the nuclear power plant in Japan.

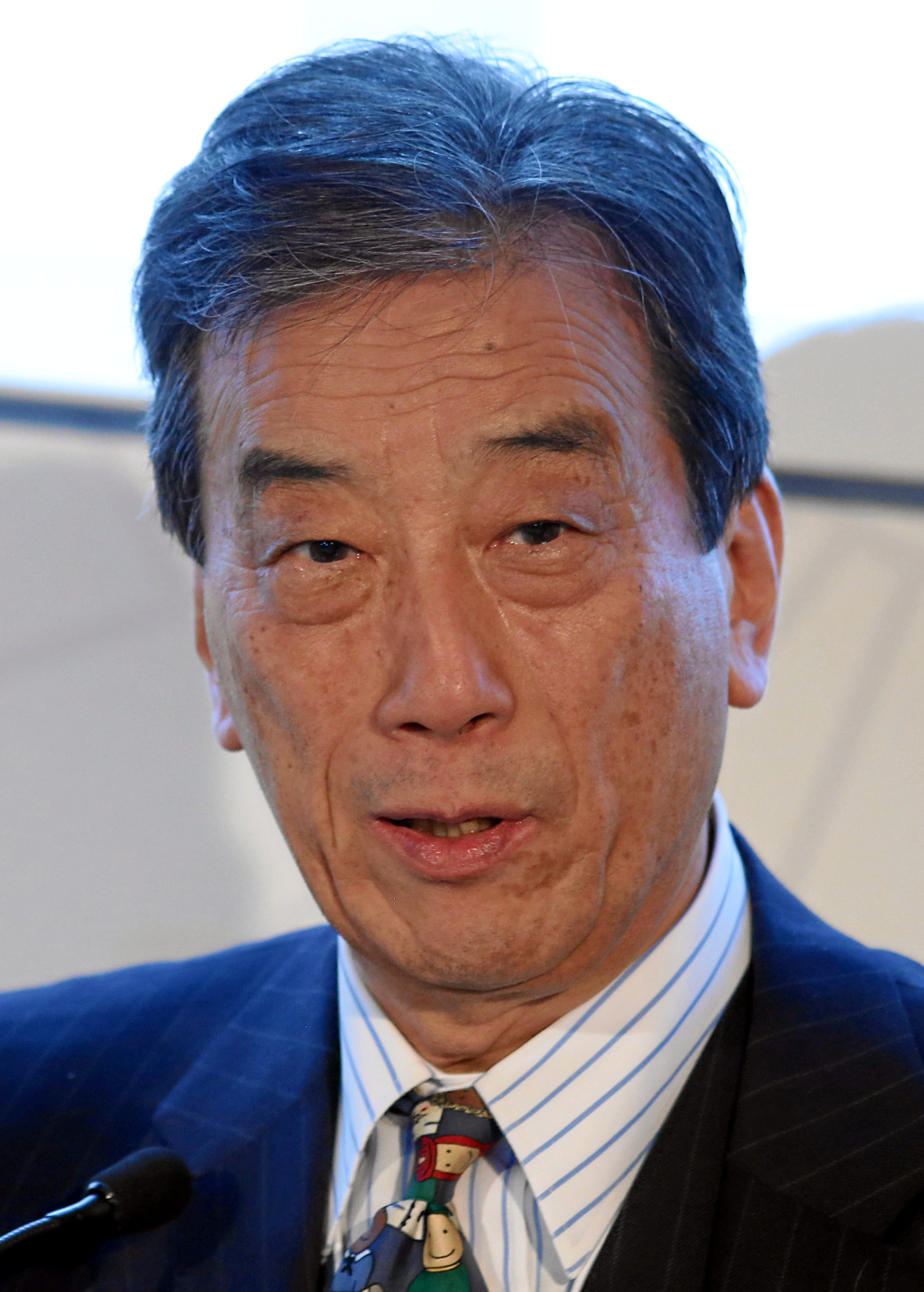
Kiyoshi Kurokawa

The Commission acknowledged that the affected residents are still struggling and facing grave concerns, including the "health effects of radiation exposure, displacement, the dissolution of families, disruption of their lives and lifestyles and the contamination of vast areas of the environment". The decontamination and restoration activities, essential for rebuilding communities, will continue into the long term.

== General ==
The joint committee of House of Representatives of Japan and House of Councillors enacted the statutory law to enable an independent commission. The commission investigated many individuals, including the management of Tokyo Electric Power Company and the members of the Kan cabinet when the accident had happened. The commission also heard the opinion and medical conditions of survivors caused by ionizing radiation and evacuation. The commission is fully open to the public through websites, Ustream and Nico Nico Douga, conducted live on Twitter and archived. Video streaming of the commission session was available in English language interpretation simultaneously in live and archive.

On July 5, 2012, the National Diet of Japan Fukushima Nuclear Accident Independent Investigation Commission released an executive summary report of The Fukushima Nuclear Accident. The report "blames Japanese culture for the fundamental causes of the disaster."

== Membership ==
The joint committee was composed of members appointed by the Diet of Japan.

=== Chairperson ===
- Kiyoshi Kurokawa; doctor of medicine, professor emeritus University of Tokyo, former chairperson Science Council of Japan

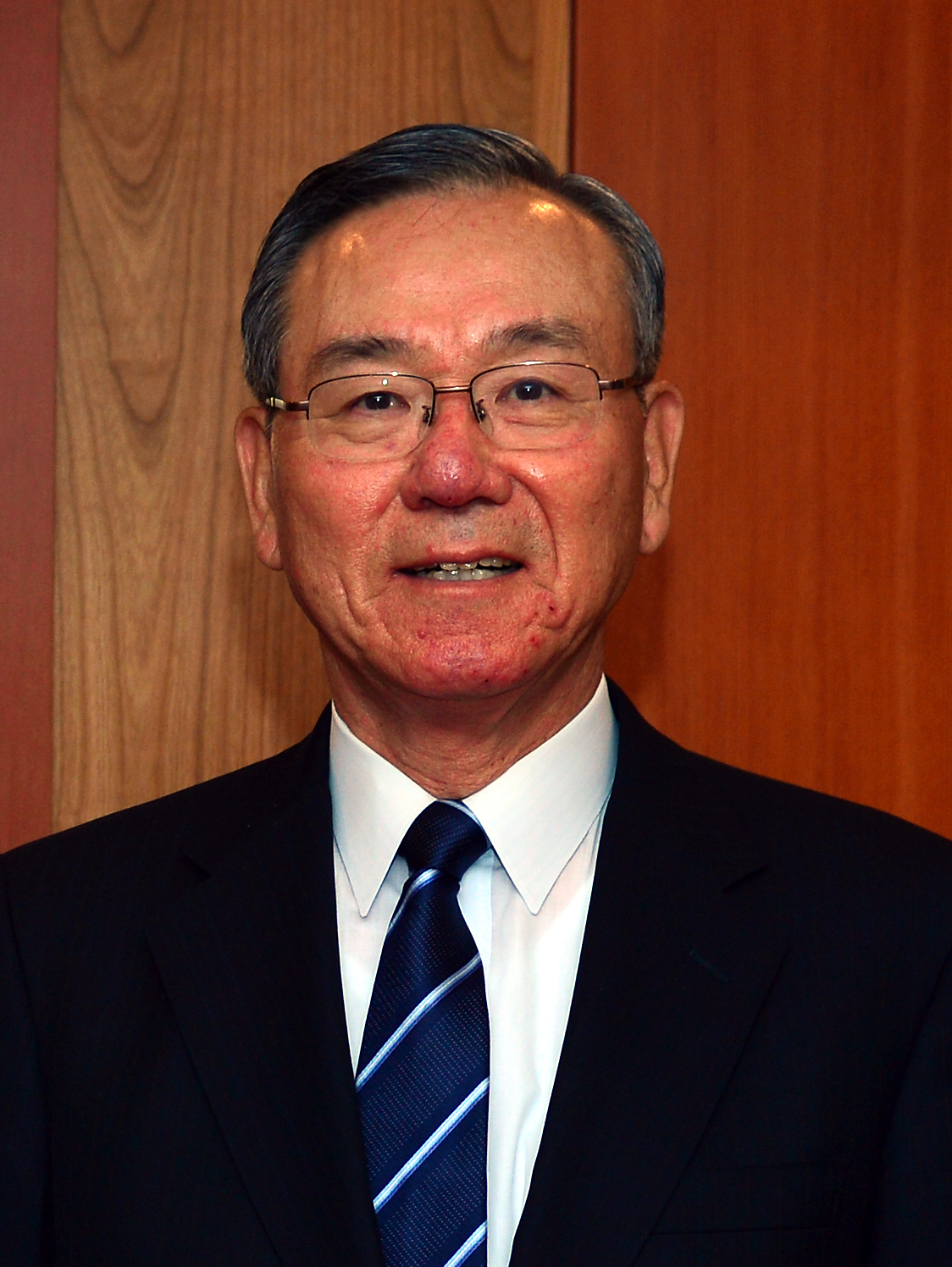
Kenzo Oshima

=== Members ===
- Katsuhiko Ishibashi; Seismologist, professor emeritus Kobe University
- Kenzo Oshima; Adviser to the President of JICA, former Ambassador of Japan to the United Nations
- Hisako Sakiyama; doctor of medicine, former senior researcher in National Institute of Radiological Sciences (NIRS）
- Masafumi Sakurai; Attorney-at-Law, former Chief Prosecutor of Nagoya High Public Prosecutors Office, former Inspector General for Legal Compliance - Inspector General's Office of Ministry of Defense
- Koichi Tanaka; scientist on Chemistry, Research fellow of Shimadzu Corp.
- Mitsuhiko Tanaka; Science journalist, former manufacturing Engineer of Nuclear reactor
- Shuya Nomura; Attorney-at-Law, Professor of Graduate School of Law - Chuo University
- Reiko Hachisuka; Chair person of Society of Commerce and Industry of Okuma Town - Fukushima Prefecture
- Yoshinori Yokoyama; Social System Designer; Planning Director at the University of Tokyo Executive Management Program

=== Junior counsellor ===
- Itsuro Kimura; professor emeritus Kyoto University, Director Institute of Nuclear Technology-Kyoto University, Consultant Osaka Science & Technology Center
- Tatsuhiko Kodama; Professor, doctor of medicine, General manager of Radioisotope Center-University of Tokyo
- Tatsuo Hatta; professor emeritus Osaka University, professor emeritus National Graduate Institute for Policy Studies

== Commission findings ==
The nuclear incident "cannot be regarded as a natural disaster," the NAIIC panel's chairman, Tokyo University professor emeritus Kiyoshi Kurokawa, wrote in the inquiry report. "It was a profoundly man-made disaster -- that could and should have been foreseen and prevented. And its effects could have been mitigated by a more effective human response." "Governments, regulatory authorities and Tokyo Electric Power [TEPCO] lacked a sense of responsibility to protect people's lives and society," the Diet's Fukushima Nuclear Accident Independent Investigation Commission said. "They effectively betrayed the nation's right to be safe from nuclear accidents. Therefore, we conclude that the accident was clearly 'man-made'," it said.

The nuclear incident was the result of poor earthquake-safety planning and faulty post-tsunami communication. As a result of collusion between the facility's operator Tokyo Electric Power Co. (TEPCO), regulators, and the Japanese government, the nuclear crisis at the Fukushima Daiichi power plant unfolded as a "man-made disaster". The report attributed the cause of the failings to Japan's culture of "reflexive obedience", noted that there was no separation between atomic regulation and promotion, and described a Japan in which nuclear power became "an unstoppable force, immune to scrutiny by civil society." TEPCO, regulators and the government "failed to correctly develop the most basic safety requirements -- such as assessing the probability of damage, preparing for containing collateral damage from such a disaster, and developing evacuation plans," the NAIIC said. According to the report, the lack of training and knowledge of the TEPCO workers at the facility reduced the effectiveness of the response to the situation at a critical time following the quake and tsunami. As the crisis escalated, TEPCO, the regulators, government agencies, and the prime minister's office were ineffective in "preventing or limiting the consequential damage" at Fukushima Daiichi.

"According to this commission's study, on March 11, it is believed that the Fukushima Daiichi nuclear power plant was in a vulnerable condition with no guarantee it could withstand earthquakes and tsunamis," the report said. The government and plant operator TEPCO have been unwilling to say the reactors could have been damaged by the initial earthquake. An earlier report by TEPCO had all but cleared the huge utility, saying the size of the earthquake and tsunami was beyond all expectations and could not reasonably have been foreseen. But the report of the commission said: "Despite having a number of opportunities to take measures, regulatory agencies and TEPCO management deliberately postponed decisions, did not take action or took decisions that were convenient for themselves." It also said that had the company had its way, its staff would have been evacuated from the crippled plant and the catastrophe could have spiraled even further out of control.

According to The New York Times, the report criticized TEPCO as being too quick to dismiss earthquake damage as a cause of the fuel meltdowns at three of the plant's six reactors, which overheated when the site lost power. TEPCO has contended that the plant withstood the earthquake that rocked eastern Japan, instead placing blame for the disaster on what some experts have called a “once in a millennium” tsunami that followed. TECPO executives have suggested that such a rare calamity was beyond the scope of contingency planning and is unlikely to pose a threat to Japan's other nuclear reactors in the foreseeable future. The parliamentary report suggests that Reactor No. 1 in particular might have suffered earthquake damage, including the possibility that pipes burst from the shaking, leading to a loss of coolant even before the tsunami hit the plant about 30 minutes after the initial earthquake. The report emphasized that a full assessment would require better access to the inner workings of the reactors, which may not be possible for years. “However,” the report said, “it is impossible to limit the direct cause of the accident to the tsunami without substantive evidence. The commission believes that this is an attempt to avoid responsibility by putting all the blame on the unexpected (the tsunami),” the report continued, adding, “and not on the more foreseeable quake.”

The commission accused the Japanese government, TEPCO and nuclear regulators of failing to carry out basic safety measures despite being aware of the risks posed by earthquakes, tsunamis and other events that might cut off power systems. For example, the government-appointed Nuclear Safety Commission revised earthquake resistance standards in 2006 and ordered nuclear operators around the country to inspect their reactors, but TEPCO did not carry out any checks, and regulators did not conduct follow ups. TEPCO “manipulated its cozy relationship with regulators to take the teeth out of regulations,” the report said.

Nuclear power plants should have been made more quake-proof, but Japan's nuclear bloc, while reassuring the nation about its safe atomic plants, ignored safeguards that would have helped strengthen the Fukushima facility against a massive, but foreseeable earthquake. The Nuclear and Industrial Safety Agency (NISA) did not press TEPCO to prepare for a so-called full station blackout — the loss of main and backup power — because the “probability was small.” NISA instead asked TEPCO to explain why new prevention measures would not be necessary. Regulators and nuclear operators went to painstaking lengths to ignore safety risks at the plant or cover them up. They disregarded earlier warnings from outside watchdog groups that earthquakes posed a significant safety risk to the nuclear plants, and by doing so they “effectively betrayed the nation’s right to be safe from nuclear accidents.” The report said "it is considered that TEPCO management knew about delays in anti-quake works and postponement of tsunami measures and were aware that the Fukushima Daiichi was vulnerable". TEPCO also failed to act promptly, the panel concluded, but added: "This should not be attributed to individuals … at the plant but the structural problems of TEPCO." The NAIIC blamed lax safety measures on what it called the country's powerful and “collusive” decision-makers and on a conformist culture that allowed them to operate with little scrutiny. “What must be admitted — very painfully — is that this was a disaster ‘Made in Japan,’” investigation chairman Kiyoshi Kurokawa wrote in the introduction to the report. “Its fundamental causes are to be found in the ingrained conventions of Japanese culture: our reflexive obedience; our reluctance to question authority; our devotion to ‘sticking with the program’; our groupism; and our insularity.”

Chain of command was disrupted amidst the crisis, creating confusion, while communication failures about critical decisions undermined trust between the different parties. The prime minister’s office waited too long to declare a state of emergency. TEPCO’s disaster-response manuals were out of date and were missing key diagrams, while TEPCO was too slow to relay information to the government. The administration of then prime minister Naoto Kan hampered operations as the disaster unfolded, the report said, and did not use a logical chain of command. "The prime minister's office was supposed to contact the plant operator through an on-the-spot task force. But … issued direct instructions to TEPCO head office and the accident site, confusing the command line." Then-Prime Minister Naoto Kan traveled to the plant mid-meltdown and “diverted the attention and time of the on-site operational staff and confused the line of command,” the report said. “Had the head office of TEPCO actively communicated the on-site situation from the start, and explained the severity of the situation to the other parties,” the report said, “there is a possibility that the distrust — and the confusion in the chain of command that followed — could have been prevented.”

== Commission Recommendations ==
The NAIIC made a series of recommendations to try to avoid a repeat of the catastrophe, such as the need to overhaul Japan's nuclear regulation system by creating an independent watchdog, due to the fact that the nuclear safety agency was a part of the same government ministry that promoted nuclear power. The commission also recommended that the Diet establish a permanent, parliamentary oversight panel to deal with nuclear power and supervise regulators to ensure that the government and utilities carry out the necessary measures to prevent any recurrence of the Fukushima disaster. A "fundamental re-examination of the crisis management system" was suggested. The report also called for measures tackling public health and welfare issues, including the establishment of a system "to deal with long-term public health effects," monitoring "hot spots" and "the spread of radioactive contamination", and for starting "a detailed and transparent program of decontamination and relocation." In addition, a system of independent investigation commissions dealing with nuclear issues was recommended. The findings published by NAIIC call for further investigation of the impact of the 9.0 magnitude earthquake - as opposed to the towering tsunami - on the reactors at Fukushima. The report also urged the government to set clear disclosure rules about its relationship with nuclear operators. Suggesting that the mind-set that supported the negligence at Fukushima "can be found across Japan," Kurokawa also urged citizens to "reflect on our responsibility as individuals in a democratic society."

The BBC summarised the recommendations of the NAICC as follows:

- Permanent committee in National Diet to oversee the regulators, with regular investigations and hearings
- Reform of the crisis management system, making boundaries between responsibilities of local and national governments and the operators clear, and establishing clear chain of command in emergency situations
- Establishment of system to deal with long-term public health effects, including monitoring and decontaminating radiation-affected areas
- Dramatic corporate reform of Tepco and new relationships established among the electric power companies built on safety issues, mutual supervision and transparency
- New regulatory body established on independence, transparency, professionalism, and consolidation of functions
- Reform of laws related to nuclear energy to meet global standards of safety, public health and welfare
- Develop a system of independent investigation commissions

== See also ==
- Investigation Committee on the Accident at the Fukushima Nuclear Power Stations of Tokyo Electric Power Company
