= Investigation Committee on the Accident at the Fukushima Nuclear Power Stations of Tokyo Electric Power Company =

Japanese government committee

The Investigation Committee on the Accident at the Fukushima Nuclear Power Stations of Tokyo Electric Power Company was formed June 7, 2011 by the Japanese government as an independent body to investigate the March Fukushima Daiichi nuclear disaster. The Investigation Committee issued an interim report in December 2011, and issued its final report in July 2012.

== Investigation ==
=== The Committee ===
The Investigation Committee on the Accident at the Fukushima Nuclear Power Stations (ICANPS) was tasked with: "conducting an investigation to determine the causes of the accident that occurred at Fukushima Daiichi and Daini Nuclear Power Stations of Tokyo Electric Power Company, and those of the damages generated by the accident, and thereby making policy proposals designed to prevent the expansion of the damages and the recurrence of similar accidents in the future". The 10 member, government-appointed panel included scholars, journalists, lawyers and engineers, was supported by public prosecutors and government experts interviewed 772 people, including plant workers, government officials and evacuees, for a total of nearly 1,479 hearing hours - and released its final 448-page investigation report on July 23, 2012. Its report was the fourth investigation into the crisis after the earlier release of a parliamentary study, a private report by journalists and academics as well as an investigation by TEPCO.

=== Interim investigation report ===
For the interim report issued on December 26, 2011, the committee interviewed 456 people over a total of 900 hours of hearings by Dec. 16, 2011. The interim report was "a scathing assessment of the response to the Fukushima disaster", in which the investigative panel "blamed the central government and the Tokyo Electric Power Co., saying both seemed incapable of making decisions to stem radiation leaks as the situation at the coastal plant worsened in the days and weeks after the disaster". It attaches blame to Japan's central government as well as Tokyo Electric Power Co., "depicting a scene of harried officials incapable of making decisions to stem radiation leaks as the situation at the coastal plant worsened in the days and weeks following the disaster". The 507-page interim report, said Japan's response to the crisis at Fukushima Daiichi was flawed by "poor communication and delays in releasing data on dangerous radiation leaks at the facility", and poor planning also worsened the disaster response, noting that authorities had "grossly underestimated tsunami risks" that followed the magnitude 9.0 earthquake. The 15m (40-foot) high tsunami that struck the plant was twice as tall as the highest wave predicted by officials, and the erroneous assumption that the plant's cooling system continued to work after the tsunami struck worsened the disaster. "Plant workers had no clear instructions on how to respond to such a disaster, causing miscommunication, especially when the disaster destroyed backup generators. Ultimately, the series of failures led to the worst nuclear catastrophe since Chernobyl".

The report concluded “It's inexcusable that a nuclear accident couldn't be managed because a major event such as the tsunami exceeded expectations.” An account said "[t]he report, which is highly critical of TEPCO as well as the authorities contrasts with the conclusions of a separate exercise by Tepco, which laid blame for the crisis squarely on the natural disaster." NISA, Japan's nuclear regulatory agency, received "some of [the] strongest criticism" in the report.

=== Final investigation report ===
The panel said the government and TEPCO failed to prevent the disaster not because a large tsunami was unanticipated, but because they were reluctant to invest time, effort and money in protecting against a natural disaster considered unlikely. "The utility and regulatory bodies were overly confident that events beyond the scope of their assumptions would not occur . . . and were not aware that measures to avoid the worst situation were actually full of holes," the government panel said in its final report. TEPCO had even weighed in on a report about earthquake risk and asked the government to play down the likelihood of a tsunami in the region, the report said. The panel's report faulted an inadequate legal system for nuclear crisis management, a crisis-command disarray caused by the government and Tepco, and possible excess meddling on the part of the prime minister's office in the early stage of the crisis. The panel concluded that a culture of complacency about nuclear safety and poor crisis management led to the nuclear disaster.

The report stated that measures taken by TEPCO and the Japanese nuclear regulator to prepare the Fukushima nuclear plant for earthquakes and tsunamies were "insufficient" and their response to the Fukushima Daiichi nuclear disaster was "inadequate." "Preparedness for a large-scale complex disaster was insufficient; and they were unprepared for the release of a large amount of radioactive materials into the environment caused by a containment failure," noted the report with respect to TEPCO and the Japanese Nuclear and Industrial Safety Agency. It noted for example that Fukushima staff was poorly trained to deal with the crisis after the plant's reactors went into meltdown. TEPCO did not adequately train employees "to think independently and to act, and lacked flexible and proactive thinking required for crisis response", the report said. Tepco was criticized by the panel for failing to give most workers dosimeters that would have kept track of their exposure to harmful radiation as they fought to contain meltdowns in the early days of the crisis. While Tepco had access to hundreds of dosimeters sent from other nuclear power plants across Japan, managers of the company failed to put them to use — a sign that the company paid little heed to worker safety, the report said. Because of poor communication among Fukushima officials, the police and Japanese Self-Defense Forces personnel, the evacuation of Futaba hospital and its nearby health care facility for the elderly, located just 5 km from the damaged plant, was delayed. Residents living around the Fukushima plant may also have been able to keep exposure to minimum if the government had effectively used a computer system to predict the spread of radioactive materials, even though data on the damaged reactors were not available.

Besides a failure of disaster management and risk analysis, TEPCO lacks “sufficient enthusiasm to fully investigate the Fukushima disaster and learn lessons to prevent recurrence even more than one year after the accident,” the report said. The investigators of the panel said TEPCO has to address problems within its own culture that contributed to its failings in the crisis, including employees “not fully trained to think for themselves.” “We still don’t perceive much enthusiasm in the accident investigation from” the company, the report said. “TEPCO must take our findings sincerely and resolve the problems to achieve a higher level of safety culture across the company.” The ICANPS report also said interference by then Japan prime minister Naoto Kan at the time of the disaster created confusion in the response to the crisis. "It must be said that more harm was done (than good) as his involvement ... could have confused the scene, potentially missing opportunities to make important judgments and creating opportunities for misjudgments," the report said. Kan's office was criticized by the ICANPS panel for controlling information, delaying crucial announcements to the public and overly softening expressions about the severity of the accident, causing confusion, threats to health and public distrust in the government.

Japanese officials ignored the risks of an atomic accident because they believed in the 'myth of nuclear safety'., i.e. the notion that severe accidents don't happen at nuclear power plants in Japan. "The fundamental problem lies in the fact that utilities, including Tokyo Electric Power (TEPCO), and the government failed to see the danger as reality," the report said. It also said that they were under the 'notion that severe accidents do not happen at nuclear plants in our country'. "Because the government and the power utilities, including TEPCO, were biased by the safety myth, thinking they would never ever face such a serious accident, they were unable to realize that such a crisis could occur in reality. This appears to be the fundamental problem," the panel said in its final report. TEPCO thus failed to prepare adequate tsunami defenses or crisis management procedures to deal with a station blackout, the panel's report said. "The Fukushima crisis occurred because people didn't take the impact of natural disasters so seriously," University of Tokyo engineering professor Yotaro Hatamura, who chaired the commission, told a news conference. "Even though there were new findings (about the risk of a tsunami), TEPCO couldn't see it because people are blind to what they don't want to see."

Nuclear regulators did not pay sufficient attention to improvements in nuclear safety standards as recommended by the International Atomic Energy Agency (IAEA) and the Japanese Nuclear Industrial and Safety Agency had been promoting nuclear energy without being open about the inherent risks. According to the report, the Nuclear and Industrial Safety Agency strongly opposed a plan in 2006 to enhance preparedness against a nuclear disaster, fearing such a move would raise concerns about the safety of nuclear power among residents living near atomic plants. The failure of the central and local governments to consider the possibility of a nuclear accident caused by multiple factors such as earthquakes and tsunami also caused a delay in responding to the accident. According to the report there was an insufficient crisis management structure for ensuring the safety of local communities. The Japanese government failed to give a detailed announcement about what was happening and how it might affect people living nearby, while the Nuclear and Industrial Safety Agency was reluctant to inform the media that reactor 1's fuel rods possibly melted, although it knew that was quite likely.

The panel suggested that post-Fukushima safety steps taken at nuclear power plants across the country have not been enough to cope with a complex catastrophe. "We understand that immediate safety measures are being further detailed and will materialise in the future. But we strongly urge the people concerned to make continued efforts to take really effective steps," said the panel, chaired by University of Tokyo engineering professor Yotaro Hatamura. "Both the government and companies should establish a new philosophy of disaster prevention that requires safety and disaster measures against any massive accident and disaster... regardless of event probability," the report said.

The report criticized TEPCO's argument that the nuclear accident was due to a tsunami of an unimaginable, unpredictable scale. It stated, "The reason the accident was beyond assumptions was because no attempt was made to make assumptions due to a safety myth that had no basis in fact." The ICANPS panel said that there was no proof that the earthquake was a key factor in the disaster, but added that a certain degree of impact could not be ruled out. Many scientists and activists have disputed the Japanese government and TEPCO's findings that the plant's cooling systems were knocked out by giant waves that slammed into the plant, suggesting it was the initial earthquake that damaged the reactors. TEPCO's own investigation put the blame for the accident solely on the tsunami. The panel, however, called on TEPCO to review data that had been presented to it, saying that it believed that it contained errors. It also said TEPCO covered up unfavourable data in a computer analysis attempting to measure the extent of damage inside the reactors.

Commission chairman Yotaro Hatamura said that due to time restrictions, his panel was unable to address the concerns of residents, and the international community, who questioned whether the damaged reactors and the pool of used nuclear fuel at Fukushima's No.4 reactor could withstand another earthquake. "I now understand what people are worried the most about is the vulnerability of the No.4 spent fuel pool. I wish we had started an investigation on it much earlier," Hatamura said.

Based on the lessons learned from the accident, the panel proposed the government and utilities take safety steps regardless of the probability of tsunami and other events that could have a potentially strong impact, and review disaster reduction measures when important new findings are revealed. The final report included seven recommendations for preventing a recurrence of the Fukushima nuclear accident, such as safety measures and ways to prevent the spreading of damage. The panel didn't recommend charges against any of those involved in the Fukushima Daiichi nuclear disaster, but the panel called on the government to take immediate action on certain issues, such as ensuring off-site nuclear accident management centres are protected against the kind of massive radiation leaks that rendered the one at Fukushima unusable. It recommended that all nuclear operators in Japan conduct a comprehensive risk analysis of their facilities and urged the Japanese government and TEPCO to conduct further investigations to fully disclose the cause of the Fukushima Daiichi nuclear disaster, because there are many unresolved issues, such as the process by which radioactive materials leaked out of the Fukushima No. 1 plant. “The government shouldn’t close its accident investigation into Fukushima with the end of probes by our committee and the parliamentary commission,” Hatamura’s panel reported. “When radiation levels fall, detailed on-site examination inside reactor buildings, including examination of quake effects, must be carried out.”

=== Fukushima Nuclear Accident Independent Investigation Commission ===
On July 5, 2012, the National Diet of Japan Fukushima Nuclear Accident Independent Investigation Commission released an executive summary report of The Fukushima Nuclear Accident. The report "blames Japanese culture for the fundamental causes of the disaster."

== Membership ==
- Yotaro Hatamura, Chairperson; Professor Emeritus of the University of Tokyo, Professor of Kogakuin University
- Kazuo Oike, Director, International Institute for Advanced Studies, Former President of Kyoto University
- Shizuko Kakinuma, Team Leader, Research Center for Radiation Protection, National Institute of Radiological Science
- Yukio Takasu, Project Professor, Institute for Advanced Global Studies, The University of Tokyo, Former Permanent Representative, Ambassador Extraordinary and Plenipotentiary of Japan to the International Organizations in Vienna, and the United Nations in New York
- Toshio Takano, Attorney-at-Law, Former Superintending Prosecutor of Nagoya High Public Prosecutors Office
- Yasuro Tanaka, Professor of Meiji Law School, Former Chief Justice of the Sapporo High Court
- Yoko Hayashi, Attorney-at-Law
- Michio Furukawa, Mayor of Kawamata Town, Fukushima Prefecture
- Kunio Yanagida, Writer, Critic
- Hitoshi Yoshioka, Vice-President of Kyushu University

=== Technical advisors ===
- Seiji Abe, Professor, Kansai University
- Masao Fuchigami, Advisor, Komatsu Ltd., Ph.D. in Engineering

== See also ==
- National Diet of Japan Fukushima Nuclear Accident Independent Investigation Commission- formed by law
