= Accident rating of the Fukushima nuclear accident =

INES rating of the Fukushima nuclear disaster

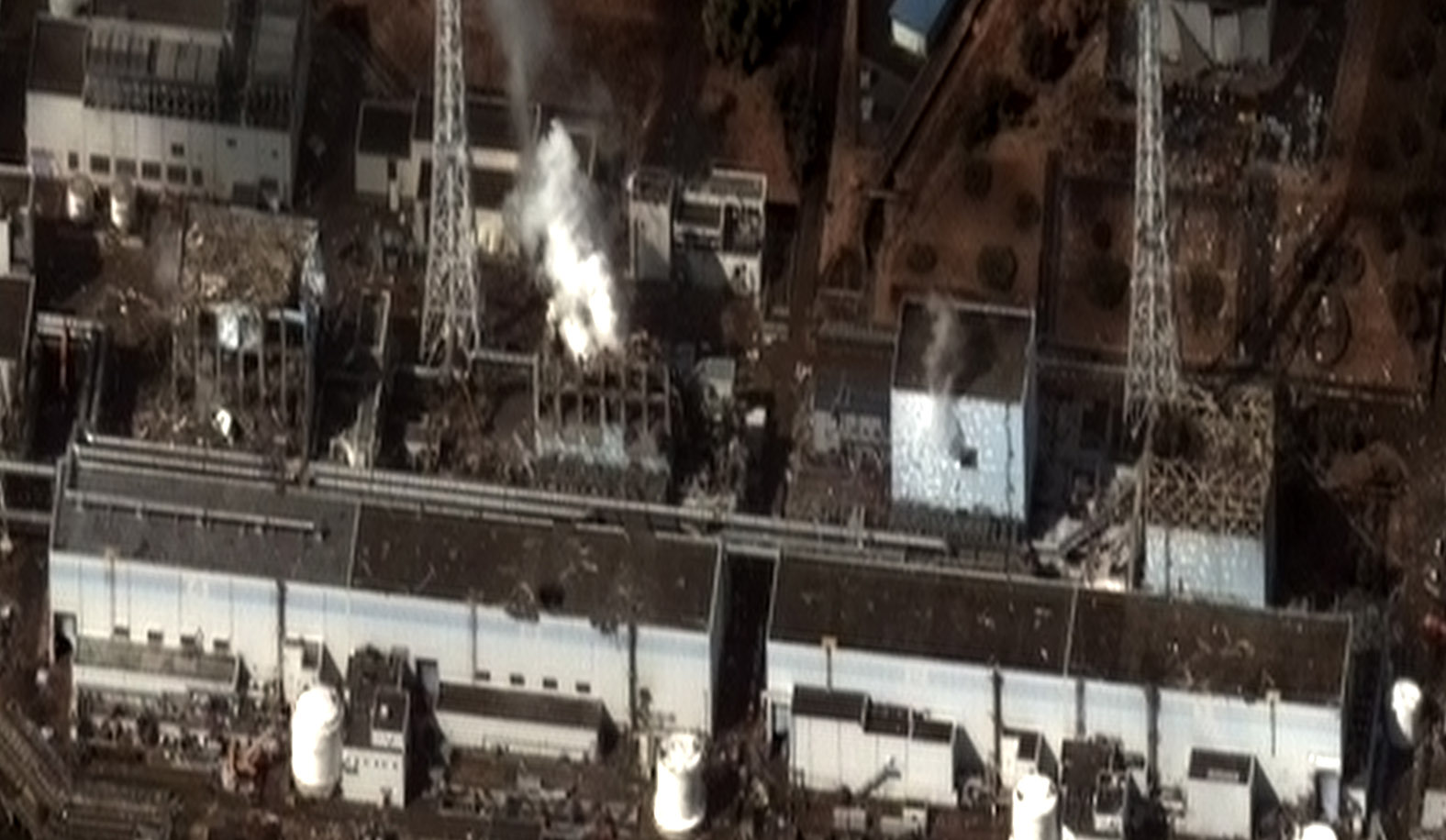
- Satellite image on 16 March 2011 of the four damaged reactor buildings
- Date: 11 March 2011
- Location: Ōkuma, Fukushima, Japan; 37°25′17″N 141°1′57″E
- Outcome: INES Level 7 (ratings by Japanese authorities as of 11 April)
- Injuries: 37 with physical injuries, 2 workers taken to hospital with possible radiation burns
- Location in Japan

External videos
- 24 hours live camera for Fukushima Daiichi nuclear disaster on YouTube, certified by Tokyo Electric Power Co. Inc.

The Fukushima Daiichi nuclear disaster (福島第一原子力発電所事故, Fukushima Dai-ichi genshiryoku hatsudensho jiko) was a series of equipment failures, nuclear meltdowns, and releases of radioactive materials at the Fukushima I Nuclear Power Plant, following the Tōhoku earthquake and tsunami on 11 March 2011. It is the largest nuclear disaster since the Chernobyl disaster of 1986.

== Overview ==
The plant comprises seven separate boiling water reactors originally designed by General Electric (GE), and maintained by the Tokyo Electric Power Company (TEPCO). At the time of the quake, Reactor 4 had been de-fueled while 5 and 6 were in cold shutdown for planned maintenance. Immediately after the earthquake, the remaining reactors 1–3 shut down automatically, and emergency generators came online to control electronics and coolant systems. However the tsunami following the earthquake quickly flooded the low-lying rooms in which the emergency generators were housed. The flooded generators failed, cutting power to the critical pumps that must continuously circulate coolant water through a Generation II nuclear reactor for several days in order to keep it from melting down after being shut down. As the pumps stopped, the reactors overheated due to the normal high radioactive decay heat produced in the first few days after nuclear reactor shutdown (smaller amounts of this heat normally continue to be released for years, but are not enough to cause fuel melting).

At this point, only prompt flooding of the reactors with seawater could have cooled the reactors quickly enough to prevent meltdown. Salt water flooding was delayed because it would ruin the costly reactors permanently. Flooding with seawater was finally commenced only after the government ordered that seawater be used, and at this point it was too late to prevent meltdown.

As the water boiled away in the reactors and the water levels in the fuel rod pools dropped, the reactor fuel rods began to overheat severely, and to melt down. In the hours and days that followed, Reactors 1, 2 and 3 experienced full meltdown.

In the intense heat and pressure of the melting reactors, a reaction between the nuclear fuel metal cladding and the remaining water surrounding them produced explosive hydrogen gas. As workers struggled to cool and shut down the reactors, several hydrogen-air chemical explosions occurred.

Concerns about the repeated small explosions, the atmospheric venting of radioactive gasses, and the possibility of larger explosions led to a 20 km (12 mi)-radius evacuation around the plant. During the early days of the accident workers were temporarily evacuated at various times for radiation safety reasons. At the same time, sea water that had been exposed to the melting rods was returned to the sea heated and radioactive in large volumes for several months until recirculating units could be put in place to repeatedly cool and re-use a limited quantity of water for cooling. The earthquake damage and flooding in the wake of the tsunami hindered external assistance. Electrical power was slowly restored for some of the reactors, allowing for automated cooling.

== Assessment ==
Japanese officials initially assessed the accident as Level 4 on the International Nuclear Event Scale (INES) despite the views of other international agencies that it should be higher. The level was later raised to 5 and eventually to 7, the maximum scale value. The Japanese government and TEPCO have been criticized in the foreign press for poor communication with the public and improvised cleanup efforts. On 20 March, the Chief Cabinet Secretary Yukio Edano announced that the plant would be decommissioned once the crisis was over.

== Radioactivity released ==
The Japanese government estimates the total amount of radioactivity released into the atmosphere was approximately one-tenth as much as was released during the Chernobyl disaster. Significant amounts of radioactive material have also been released into ground and ocean waters. Measurements taken by the Japanese government 30–50 km from the plant showed caesium-137 levels high enough to cause concern, leading the government to ban the sale of food grown in the area. Tokyo officials temporarily recommended that tap water should not be used to prepare food for infants. In May 2012, TEPCO reported that at least 900 PBq had been released "into the atmosphere in March last year [2011] alone".

== Injuries ==
Several of the plant's workers were severely injured or killed by the disaster conditions resulting from the earthquake. There were no immediate deaths due to direct radiation exposures, but at least six workers have exceeded lifetime legal limits for radiation and more than 300 have received significant radiation doses. Predicted future cancer deaths due to accumulated radiation exposures in the population living near Fukushima have ranged from none to 100 to a non-peer-reviewed "guesstimate" of 1,000. On 16 December 2011, Japanese authorities declared the plant to be stable, although it would take decades to decontaminate the surrounding areas and to decommission the plant altogether. On 5 July 2012, the parliament appointed The Fukushima Nuclear Accident Independent Investigation Commission (NAIIC) submitted its inquiry report to the Japanese parliament, while the government appointed Investigation Committee on the Accident at the Fukushima Nuclear Power Stations of Tokyo Electric Power Company submitted its final report to the Japanese government on 23 July 2012. Tepco admitted for the first time on 12 October 2012 that it had failed to take stronger measures to prevent disasters for fear of causing lawsuits or protests against its nuclear plants.

== Accident rating ==
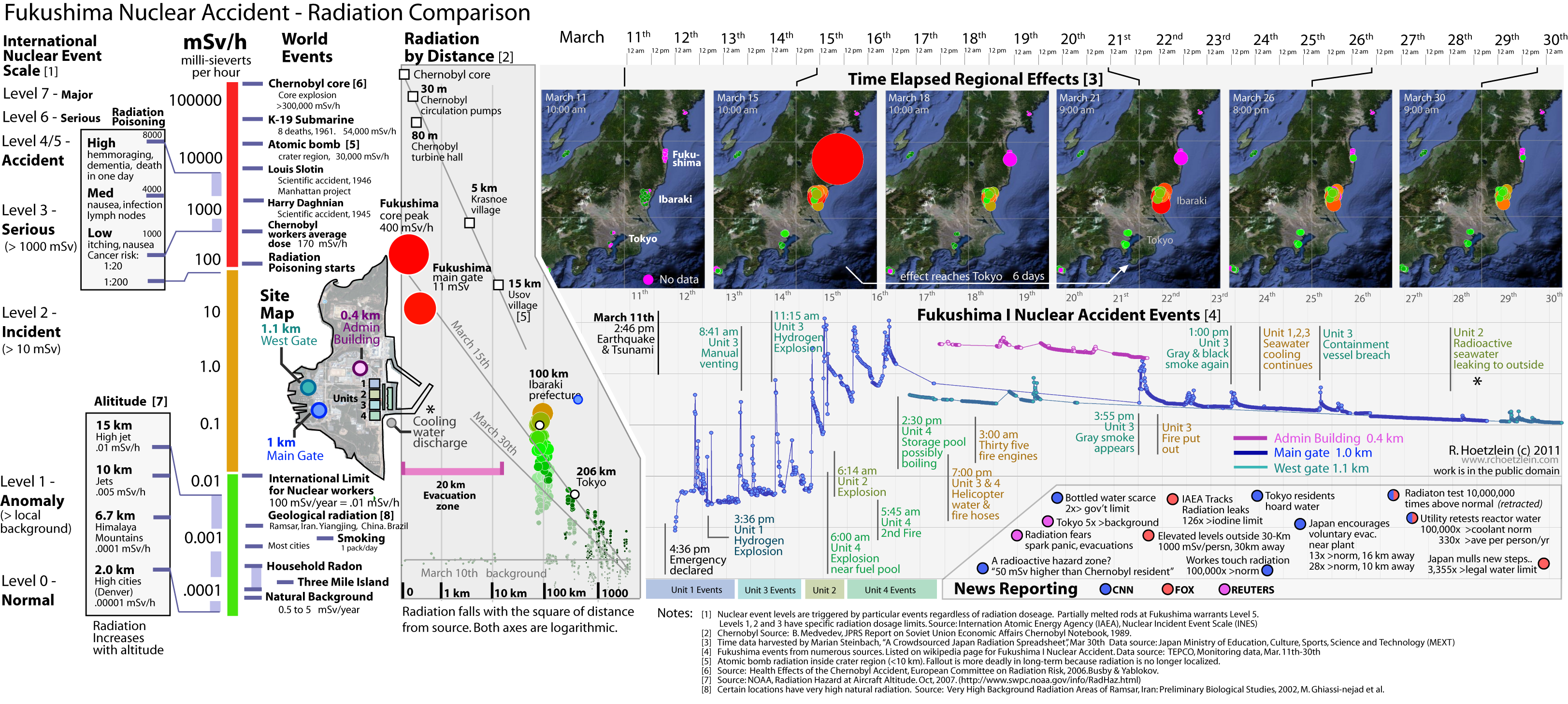
Comparison of radiation levels for different nuclear events.

The severity of the nuclear accident is provisionally rated 7 on the International Nuclear Event Scale (INES). This scale runs from 0, indicating an abnormal situation with no safety consequences, to 7, indicating an accident causing widespread contamination with serious health and environmental effects. Prior to Fukushima, the Chernobyl disaster was the only level 7 accident on record, while the Three Mile Island accident was a level 5 accident. Arnold Gundersen, an engineer frequently commissioned by anti-nuclear groups, said that "Fukushima is the biggest industrial catastrophe in the history of mankind". However, current estimates of the total amount of radioactivity released from the 3 Fukushima Daiichi reactors is only 10–20% that from Chernobyl.

The Japan Atomic Energy Agency initially rated the Unit 1 situation as below both of these previous accidents; on 13 March it announced it was classifying the event as Level 4, an "accident with local consequences". On 18 March it raised its rating on Units 1, 2 and 3 to Level 5, an "accident with wider consequences". It classified the situation at Unit 4 as a Level 3 "serious incident".

Several parties disputed the Japanese classifications, arguing that the situation was more severe than they were admitting at the time. On 14 March, three Russian experts stated that the nuclear accident should be classified at Level 5, perhaps even Level 6. One day later, the French nuclear safety authority and the Finnish nuclear safety authority said that the Fukushima plant could be classified as a Level 6. On 24 March, a scientific consultant for anti-nuclear environmental group Greenpeace, working with data from the Austrian ZAMG and French IRSN, prepared an analysis in which he rated the total Fukushima accident at INES level 7.

Radiation dose rates during the initial hydrogen explosions.

The Asahi Shimbun newspaper reported on 26 March that the accident might warrant Level 6, based on its calculations. The Wall Street Journal stated that Japan's NISA would make any decision on raising the level. INES Level 6, or "serious accident", had only been applied to the Kyshtym disaster (Soviet Union, 1957), while the only level 7 was Chernobyl (Soviet Union, 1986). Previous Level 5 accidents included the Windscale fire (United Kingdom, 1957), the Lucens reactor (Switzerland, 1969), Three Mile Island accident (United States, 1979), and the Goiânia accident (Brazil, 1987).

Assessing "seriousness" as partial or full meltdown at a civilian plant, The New York Times reported on 3 April that based on remote sensing, computer "simulations suggest that the number of serious accidents has suddenly doubled, with three of the reactors at the Fukushima Daiichi complex in some stage of meltdown." The Times counted three previous civilian meltdowns, from World Nuclear Association information: Three Mile Island, Saint-Laurent Nuclear Power Plant (France, 1980, INES level 4), and Chernobyl.

On 11 April, the Japanese Nuclear and Industrial Safety Agency (NISA) temporarily raised the disaster at Fukushima Daiichi to Level 7 on the INES scale, by considering the whole event and not considering each reactor as an individual event (each rated between 3 and 5). This would make Fukushima the second Level 7 "major accident" in the history of the nuclear industry; however, radioactivity released as a result of the events at Fukushima was, as of 12 April, only approximately 10% of that released as a result of the accident at Chernobyl (1986), also rated as INES Level 7. As of 21 October 2011, the largest study on Fukushima fallout concludes that Fukushima was "the largest radioactive noble gas release in history not related to nuclear bomb testing. The release is a factor of 2.5 higher than the Chernobyl ^{133}Xe source term", although the "Xenon-133 [main noble gas] does not pose serious health risks because it is not absorbed by the body or the environment." Xenon does not remain in the atmosphere. As occurred in releases at Three Mile Island, radioactive noble gases rapidly vanish upward, and dissipate into space. Arnold Gundersen said Fukushima has 20 times the potential to be released than Chernobyl. Hot spots are being found 60 to 70 kilometres away from the reactor (further away than they were found from Chernobyl), and the amount of radiation in many of them is the amount that caused areas to be declared no-man's-land for Chernobyl.

In off-the-record-interviews with Japanese newspapers like the Tokyo Shimbun, former Japanese prime minister Naoto Kan said that there were moments he believed the disaster could have surpassed Chernobyl, many times. At first TEPCO denied that fuel-cores were melted, after all cooling functions were lost. Trade minister Banri Kaieda mentioned that TEPCO seriously considered pulling away all staff members from the plant and leaving it abandoned. Kan could not accept this: "Withdrawing from the plant is out of the question." He claimed that "If that had happened, Tokyo would be deserted by now. It was a critical moment for Japan's survival. It could have been a led to leaks of dozens of times more radiation than Chernobyl." He said that might have "compromised the very existence of the Japanese nation".

TEPCO's president at that time, Masataka Shimizu, was never clear in his answers, and TEPCO failed to obey the orders to vent one of the overheating reactors. In an interview to the Asahi Shimbun newspaper, Kan revealed that he went to the plant itself and visually inspected it from above in a helicopter because: "I felt I had to go there in person and speak to the people in charge or I would never have known what was going on." Kan said that the American government was seriously concerned about the Japanese response to the accident: "We were not told straight out, but it was obvious that they questioned whether we were really taking this seriously."

Kan defended his changed attitude to a non-nuclear energy policy, "If there is a risk of accidents that could make half the land mass of our country uninhabitable, then we cannot afford to take that risk."

== See also ==
- List of civilian nuclear accidents
- Lists of nuclear disasters and radioactive incidents
- Timeline of the Fukushima Daiichi nuclear disaster
- Comparison of Fukushima and Chernobyl nuclear accidents
