= Fukushima 50 (film) =

2020 Japanese film directed by Setsurō Wakamatsu

- Theatrical release poster
- Directed by: Setsurō Wakamatsu
- Written by: Yōichi Maekawa
- Based on: On the Brink: The Inside Story of Fukushima Daiichi by Ryusho Kadota
- Produced by: Naohiko Ninomiya
- Starring: Koichi Sato; Ken Watanabe
- Cinematography: Shoji Ehara
- Edited by: Ziliang Kai
- Music by: Taro Iwashiro
- Production company: Kadokawa Daiei Studio
- Distributed by: Shochiku; Kadokawa
- Release date: March 6, 2020 (Japan)
- Running time: 122 minutes
- Country: Japan
- Language: Japanese
- Box office: $7.4 million

Fukushima 50 is a 2020 Japanese disaster drama film directed by Setsurō Wakamatsu and written by Yōichi Maekawa. Starring Koichi Sato and Ken Watanabe, it is about the titular group of employees tasked with handling the meltdown of the Fukushima Daiichi Nuclear Power Plant after the 2011 Tōhoku earthquake and tsunami. The film is based on the book by Ryusho Kadota, titled On the Brink: The Inside Story of Fukushima Daiichi, and it is one of the first Japanese films to depict the disaster.

== Synopsis ==
At 2:46 p.m. on 11 March 2011, the largest earthquake in Japan's recorded history with a magnitude of 9.1 and a maximum seismic intensity of 7 occurred. A huge tsunami struck the Fukushima Daiichi Nuclear Power Plant. It was clear that a nuclear reactor lost all power due to flooding by the tsunami. A station blackout (SBO) caused the reactor to fall into an uncoolable situation and suffer unimaginable damage due to nuclear meltdown.

On-site workers, including Izaki Haruka, who is on duty at Units 1 and 2, remain in the nuclear power plant and work hard to control the reactor. Director Masao Yoshida, who oversees the overall command, inspires his subordinates, but also expresses anger at the head office and the Kantei (Prime Minister's Office), which are not fully aware of the situation. However, the efforts at the site were in vain and the situation continued to worsen, forcing the surrounding people to evacuate.

In the worst scenario of this accident estimated by the Kantei, the damage range would have a 250 km radius with the evacuation target population of circa 50 million people, which meant the destruction of eastern Honshu (the largest of Japan's four main islands). The only option left on the scene is "venting", which has never been done before in the world and requires a worker to manually rush into the reactor at great personal risk. The operation finally began while it was cut off from the outside world with zero information coming in.

== Cast ==
- Koichi Sato as Toshio Izaki, the shift supervisor of the power plant
- Ken Watanabe as Masao Yoshida, the site superintendent of the Fukushima Daiichi Nuclear Power Plant during the disaster
- Riho Yoshioka as Haruka Izaki
- Hidetaka Yoshioka as Takumi Maeda
- Narumi Yasuda as Mari Asano
- Shirō Sano as Prime Minister of Japan
- Mitsuru Hirata as Shigeru Hirayama
- Yuri Nakamura as Kana Maeda
- Masane Tsukayama as Keizo Izaki
- Yasuyuki Maekawa as Hideo Henmi
- Shigeru Izumiya as Matsunaga
- Shōhei Hino as Omori Hisao
- Naoto Ogata as Nojiri Shōichi

== Production ==
Filming began in November 2018. Post-production began in May 2019.

According to the executive producer Shinichiro Inoue (jp), Fukushima 50's direction to have a number of telops is an homage to the Heisei Gamera trilogy in which Toshio Miike (jp) also participated in.

== Reception ==
Mark Schilling of The Japan Times gave the film a positive review, stating it "strives, boldly for a mainstream film, to tell certain home truths, from the profits-first mindset of the plant's operators." The storyline suggesting that the Prime Minister of Japan directly boarded the nuclear power plant and delayed the venting process, leading to an expansion of the damage, is contradicted by the report of the accident investigation committee, which has completely refuted this claim. The delay in venting was primarily due to manual preparations taking time, unrelated to the Prime Minister's inspection. Science journalist Takafumi Soeda criticizes the movie for portraying the Fukushima accident as an unforeseen event caused by a tsunami beyond human expectations, while in reality, TEPCO executives, led by Director Yoshida, decided to delay tsunami countermeasures until 2016, despite technical experts at TEPCO already concluding in 2008 that tsunami countermeasures were inevitable. The accident could have been avoided if TEPCO had taken tsunami countermeasures to the same extent as other power companies. Soeda argues that the movie overlooks TEPCO's responsibility and obscures the true nature of the accident by presenting it as a heroic tale from the site. Furthermore, the author of the movie's source material, Ryusho Kadota, is a central figure in promoting far-right conspiracy theories in Japan, including QAnon conspiracy theories.
