= Julius Dobos =

Hungarian composer, synthesist and music producer

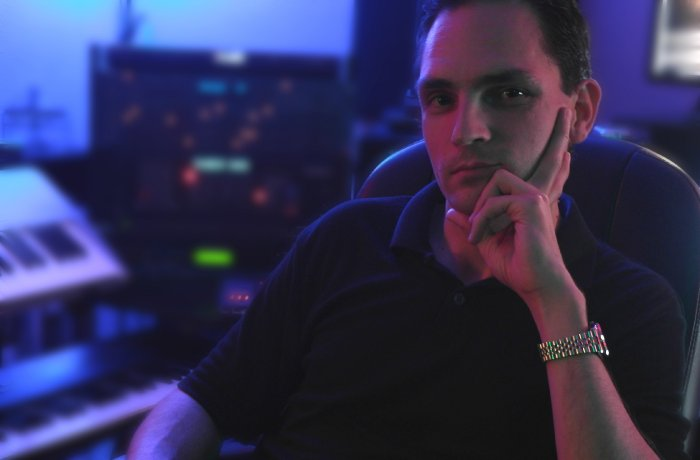
- Dobos in 2010

Background information
- Also known as: forgotten future
- Origin: Budapest, Hungary
- Genres: Electronic music, Instrumental music, Psybient, Ambient, Film scores, Orchestral music
- Occupations: Composer, producer, sound designer
- Instruments: Synthesizer, Piano, other electronic instruments, recorder
- Years active: 1994–present
- Labels: EMI, Periferic Records, JDSP, Creative Shop Music
- Website: www.juliusdobos.com

Gyula Julius Dobos (born in Budapest, Hungary) is a composer, synthesist and music producer, best known for his electronic and orchestral music releases worldwide, and for his film scores and music used in major motion pictures and television programs in Europe and in the United States.

With Mountain Flying, his most popular album up to date, Dobos became the first Hungarian composer of a large-scale orchestral-choral-electronic music project to receive international attention. With eleven album releases, including a platinum album, countless film- and television scores, Dobos is one of the prominent living electronic music composers with a Central European origin.

Dobos’ distinct musical style is characterized by emotionally deep, haunting melodies and monumental instrumentation, unique sound textures and the extensive use of synthesizers and other electronic musical instruments. Although classically trained, the composer generally disregards the formal rules of music composition. Dobos has been influenced by a wide range of musical styles and other art forms, however his post-2009 works do not follow the trends of popular musical genres. Currently living in the United States and working under the moniker forgotten future, he primarily composes psybient, ambient instrumental electronic music.

== Early life and education ==
Dobos started playing the piano at the age of five and writing music at nine. After winning several district piano competitions, his interest turned towards composition. It was in these pre-teen years, when his father introduced him to the 70's and 80's electronic music. The young Dobos was greatly influenced by the sounds and musical worlds created by electronic music pioneers like Jean Michel Jarre, Mike Oldfield, Vangelis, Rick Wakeman and the visual nature of Isao Tomita's Pictures at an Exhibition. Following his dreams of creating musical worlds, or “visible music”, he found himself spending more time with composing than practicing the piano, and also obsessed with his new interest: learning about electronic musical instruments. He recorded his first collection of music pieces titled Mars in his parents’ living room with a very modest Yamaha synthesizer, borrowing his father’s two-track Teac X-7 reel-to-reel tape recorder.

After quitting his piano classes, Dobos studied composition and film score composition at various institutions in Europe, including the Weiner Leo Music School in Budapest and the University of Music and Performing Arts in Stuttgart in Germany, but never obtained a formal degree in composition. In a later radio interview, Julius expressed his beliefs about Europe's classical music training methods and music education system in general: “These ideas including solmization are greatly beneficial for performers, but severely narrowing the vision of composers and limiting the development of their personal style to its full extent. They are restricting their personal artistic freedom to creating original music without having to obey the formal rules”. After selectively learning the composition and orchestration techniques he found beneficial for his personal approach, Dobos started composing music for radio and TV commercials, mainly in Hungary.

The first few local successes and his involvement with the electronic instrument-maker Roland Corporation, whose newly introduced synthesizers he composed music and designed sounds for, enabled him to build his modest home recording setup, consisting of only two synthesizers and a computer. This is where, at the age of 19, he composed the early "demo" version of Mountain Flying – the music that brought him international success three years later with the album of the same title.

== Mainstream success: 1997–1999 ==
=== Connecting Images ===
Dobos made his first appearance on Hungarian State Television 1, performing his piece Mountain Flying on synthesizers. Although he received great feedback from the viewers, neither this television performance, nor later radio broadcasts of Mountain Flying raised the interest of record labels.

In 1997, Dobos met Zsolt Menesi, Regional Marketing Director for Nokia. Menesi was immediately impressed by the young composer’s original musical style, unique vision, warm personality yet rather strong opinion about the mainstream music scene of the time. Instead of a sponsorship he was initially looking for, Dobos was offered the opportunity to produce a promotional / for-sale Nokia-sponsored album about communication, styles of self-expression and of course, mobile phones. Albeit the topic was challenging to put into music, the resulting album, Connecting Images, featured Dobos’ own, distinct musical style, catchy melodies, monumental instrumentation, a 50-piece choir and Grammy Awarded vocalist Márta Sebestyén on the track Connecting People. The album was exceptionally well received by listeners, to the satisfaction of Nokia. It was also a wakeup call for the country’s record industry, which had previously believed that there was no popular demand for music that did not belong to the mainstream or jazz or classical music category. The album reached platinum status in Hungary.

=== Mountain Flying ===
The success of Connecting Images was followed by the large-scale realization of Mountain Flying, as the expanded and revised version of the compositions from Julius Dobos’ teenage years. The main supporter of the project was Nokia. After 7 months of production, Mountain Flying was released in November 1999. The album, which was the first large-scale electronic-orchestral music production by a Hungarian composer, featuring a 130-piece symphonic orchestra and choir, multitude of synthesizers evoking the sonic world of snow-capped mountains, and once again Márta Sebestyén on the track "New Pangea", was an instant hit. The success of Mountain Flying quickly spread across Europe and taking advantage of early online distribution channels, reached the fans of electronic and modern orchestral music worldwide.

"Mountain Flying is an adventure in your fantasy, a movie score without a movie. It is the musical expression of feelings like freedom, openness and respect for nature" - the CD booklet reads. Dobos often describes the project as an album “made without much of a compromise”, referring to Nokia’s conceptual influence in Connecting Images and the resources and time the major production required.

Mountain Flying Part I. is used as the theme music of the Hungarian MTVA's Itthon vagy! – Magyarország, szeretlek! (You are at home! – Hungary, I love you!) annual TV show since 2012.

=== Movie scores and other works in Europe ===
Dobos wrote his first major film score at the age of 22, for the action-adventure movie Europe Express. Subsequently, he was named The Youngest feature film music composer in Central and Eastern Europe. Although the movie was a moderate success, the score was praised by both movie critics and audiences. Pest Est (leading program magazine of Hungary) called the score "exceptional and atom-professional" and Filmvilag (World of Film), Hungary's artistic movie review magazine wrote "Dobos' score would easily work in Hollywood superproductions". No live orchestra, but a great number of electronic instruments and a large choir were used for the score, which featured several character themes and electronic soundscapes for various scenes.

In the following two years, Dobos composed more original music scores, including those for the movies Thend and Black Strawberries , a Balkan War-themed radioplay, as well as Musique concrète pieces for exhibitions and movie theaters.

== Music production in the United States: 2000–2006 ==
=== Television scores and Epic ===
Motivated by the creative possibilities of motion pictures and music, and at the encouragement of Black Strawberries director Marion Stuart, Dobos relocated to the United States in 2000.

Before getting more involved with the American film- and television industry, the orchestral-electronic piece Peter's Flight was born. The music commissioned by Aerobatics World Champion pilot Péter Besenyei for his musical stunt program at the World Championship of Aerobatics (2002) was produced in a rather unusual way. The first time in the sport’s history, the pilot and composer reversed the order of production; it was not Besenyei who followed a chosen music track with his flight, as it is customary among pilots, but Dobos scored the video recording of Besenyei’s preferred aerobatic program, following musically every move, similarly to a film score. The instrumental music enthusiast pilot, and the composer whose favorite theme has been flying, became friends during the uniquely creative process.

In the following years, Dobos composed music and programmed sounds for several popular television shows. His work can be heard on Dragon Ball Z (at the time working as composer in residence at Faulconer Productions), the number one anime show on Cartoon Network in 2001, an award-winning claymation series Red Planet Blues, for The Reality of Speed and Your House & Home television series.

In 2003, under the wings of his music production company, JDSProductions (later The Creative Shop ), Julius produced the high-energy electronic music album, Epic , which includes nine instrumental electronic tracks and five trance-pop songs. Although the music of Epic can be considered Dobos’ most mainstream album, the tones and sounds reveal a great attention to detail with original sound design and synthesizer programming. Epic was well received at its official premiere at the Winter Music Conference in Miami, Florida in 2004, but due to the rapid changes in the music industry that resulted in lack of funding for promotion by major labels, the album became a limited edition release.

Feeling disenchanted by the absence of a truly creative process and the increasing use of ghostwriter composers in the film- and television music industry, Dobos looked for opportunities to satisfy his hunger for original music composition without forced artistic direction, and to return to his true, personal compositional style and the use of electronic instruments.

=== Electronic music library projects ===
Also in 2003, Dobos composed music for a music library project, and titled the album Tekno Chemistry . The sixteen rhythmically driving tracks (fourteen originals and two alternate mixes), features catchy melodies and custom-programmed synthesizer sounds. They are all themed around the distinct character of fourteen elements of the periodic table. The music from Tekno Chemistry has been used in various television shows and advertising.

ElectroScapes , another music library project followed soon. In an electronic music journey through space, every track of the album evokes a unique setting, a distinct sonic and musical environment of an "electronic landscape". Produced with extensive sound design and synthesizer programming, Dobos’ haunting melodies and textures make ElectroScapes a groovy yet ambient album with a unique character, making it easy to visualize the imaginary landscapes. The album was also the first major work of the composer that did not feature large instrumentation, rather it relied on multi-layered sonic textures.

== Independent years: 2007– 2014 ==
=== Music in major movies ===
Re-organizing his production company and composition studio, Studio CS , Julius Dobos took a fresh approach with his music composition, focusing exclusively on producing various styles of electronic music. He created music for use in such international blockbusters as Adam Sandler’s You Don't Mess with the Zohan (2008), Paul Blart: Mall Cop (2009), Bucky Larson: Born to Be a Star (2011), Zookeeper (2011) and others.

Throughout 2009 and 2010, Dobos also wrote several individual pieces of electronic and ambient-electronic music, constantly evolving and altering his production approach, while keeping the characteristics of his compositional style.

=== Transitions ===
Under his label, Creative Shop Music, a new compilation album titled Transitions was released in December 2010, featuring many of Dobos’ individual music pieces written between 2005 and 2010.

As the tracks of Transitions are arranged in chronological order based on their time of creation, the composer's darker period is identifiable by several unexpectedly aggressive titles such as Big Break and Reality, and can be placed between the years 2005 and 2008. The booklet of Transitions also confirms these dates with various adjectives and related track titles shown around a graphical timeline. One can observe that this period matches the years of Dobos' negative experiences and general disappointment with the limited creative freedom allowed by the film- and music industry.

Dobos deliberately chose the release date of December 27, right after Christmas, to make a point about not creating music for sale (as most labels strive to put out releases before the holidays), but publishing music that is not influenced by the typical routines of the film- and music industry.

=== Hymn to The Fukushima 50 ===
Following the events related to the Fukushima I nuclear accidents of 2011, Dobos composed a powerful musical tribute, titled Hymn to The Fukushima 50, to honor the Fukushima 50, the men and women making a great sacrifice by performing work in abnormal levels of radiation at the damaged reactors, to honor the survivors of the 2011 Tōhoku earthquake and tsunami, and to support the relief efforts by inspiring donations. He achieved the latter by publishing a 5-minute video, which features the Hymn to The Fukushima 50 music, precisely edited together with the video (not unlike the way film scores work), and asking viewers to donate to the Japan relief efforts through their choice of charity organization. In exchange for donations, Dobos offered a free download of the Hymn to The Fukushima 50.

The emotional, powerful piece received highly positive feedback on YouTube, where the video was published. The piece received over 10,000 views in the first week, and over 30,000 views within three weeks of its launch. The concept of inspiring donations also worked, as on April 4, 2011, The Creative Shop reported approximately $10,000 in inspired donations.

The Hymn features Dobos' typical mix of monumental electro-orchestral and electronic instrumentation, as well as thunderous percussion and sound design elements, and following a positive, uplifting feel, it ends with a mysterious sound and lack of happy ending. Dobos calls it "An emotional and powerful orchestral-electronic piece for those who have showed the word [sic] what being a patriot truly means, the Fukushima 50 Hymn expresses their heroism, the pain of Japan and celebrates the spirit of its people."

== Forgotten Future: 2014–present ==
Forgotten future is the moniker of Julius Dobos, announced on July 12, 2014 as an independent project to differentiate between its psybient musical style and concept, and the composer's earlier, mostly electronic-orchestral film score-style work. Planned as a 4-album series released under the Creative Shop Music label, forgotten future is a musical and ideological framework of a set of beliefs, related to the "big questions": Who [we are], Why [are we here], Time, Space & Nature. According to Dobos, the concept series "doesn't have an agenda and is not affiliated with any recognized religions, however, it offers a sonic environment for the listener, in which one may be influenced to remember his or her future, and inspired to find their own answers to the 'big questions'".

The first installment of the series, forgotten future: W1 was released on April 24, 2015 in compact disc and 24-bit studio master digital download formats. While the intricate and often epic electronic instrumentation, unique, cutting edge sound design, processed field recordings and rich analog organic textures are all clear characteristics of the album, strong melodies reveal a clearly European approach to the psybient, ambient genre. The electronic music took Dobos five years to produce, a large amount of which time he spent with generating and designing sounds. The 77-minute-long album was mixed by Dobos himself, pre-mastered at Ultimae Records by Vincent Villuis and mastered by Robert Rich.

The concept album's booklet features the original work of various digital painters, photographs, each referred to as "scenes", as each one conceptually relates to the fifteen tracks of the album. The booklet and the music itself also contains countless [riddles], in the form of spoken words masked by heavy processing (like an excerpt from JFK's Rice University speech), reversed playback of sounds that tie in with the meaning of the related scene, hidden weblinks, Morse code and printed messages that can be only observed from a certain angle or in case of the digital booklet, at a certain level of monitor brightness.

A forgotten future website was also launched at the time of the release, offering an interactive musical and visual mixing interface, which lets the user explore and customize seven visual- and musical layers and hidden sounds of each forgotten future track.

=== Influences ===
The influence of the early electronic music pioneers including Jean Michel Jarre, Vangelis, Isao Tomita, Kraftwerk, John Carpenter, and some contemporary the works of 20th Century composers such as Béla Bartók, Michael Nyman, Wendy Carlos, Karl Jenkins, Ennio Morricone, combined with his strong desire for originality enabled Dobos to free himself of the strict rules and classical teachings of the conservative music education system, and forge his own, distinctive style.

Dobos’ music clearly reveals his European roots, his haunting melodies and chord structures instantly create deep, intense emotional experience for its listeners regardless of their cultural or social background.

=== Instrumentation and sound design ===
Dobos’ music is well known for its monumental instrumentation. This is achieved by his use of a large number of textural and melodic layers, micromelodies and countermelodies, with the instrumentation often involving the combination of electronic, traditional western and ethnic instruments. The extensive and creative use of analog and digital synthesizers and software play a major role in adding both emotional depth and sonic complexity to his works. As the composer stated:

“The sound design work is an essential part of the music creation process. Using traditional instruments, you end up focusing on the notes and rhythm. But synthesizers add a new dimension to the music: sounds. With them, you start thinking in terms of tones, textures, feelings, moods – which are often more important than the melody itself.” (Julius Dobos)

Dobos is known to use a wide array of synthesizers, ambient recordings, sound processing software, effect units and experimental techniques to generate new sounds. These receive a prominent role in his album ElectroScapes and forgotten future: W1 , which feature extensive sound design and sound programming work. In terms of equipment, studio photos reveal the use of vintage analog synthesizers, such as the Crumar Spirit, Oberheim Matrix, Sequential Circuits Pro-One, Minimoog Voyager, Yamaha CS-60, Roland TB-303 and several modern virtual analog and digital synthesizers.

== Discography ==
Year	Title	Notes	Format
1998	Connecting Images	studio album, platinum-certified	Compact Disc
1999	Mountain Flying	studio concept album	Compact Disc
2000	Applied Moods	compilation album	Compact Multimedia Disc
2003	Tekno Chemistry	commissioned studio album	Compact Disc
2004	Epic	studio album	Compact Disc
2005	Electroscapes	commissioned studio album	Compact Disc
2010	Transitions	compilation album	digital download
2015	forgotten future: W1	studio concept album	Compact disc and 24-bit digital download
2016	forgotten future: realignment [EP]	studio concept & remix album	24-bit digital download
2017	Forgotten Future Live in California	live concerts compilation album	24-bit digital download
