= Timeline of the Fukushima nuclear accident =

Chronology of events following the 2011 Fukushima nuclear disaster

Coordinates: 37°25′17″N 141°1′57″E

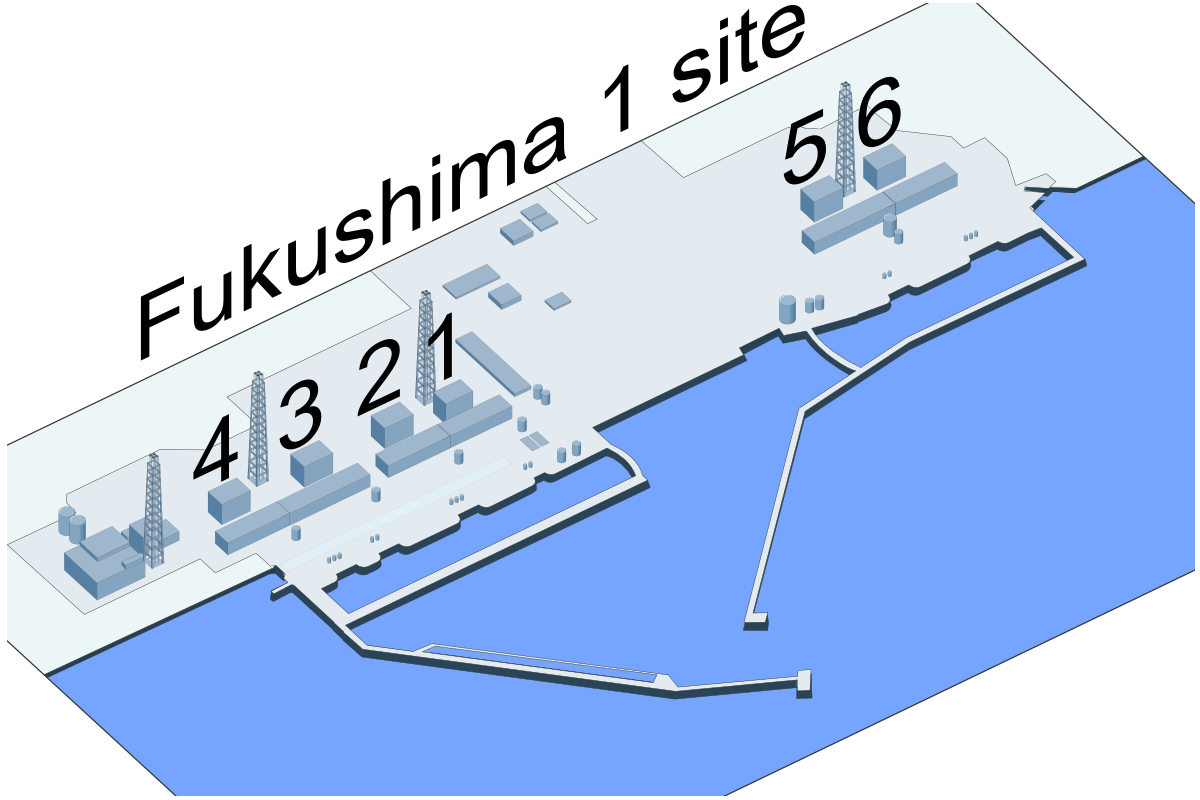
Fukushima Daiichi I nuclear powerplant site close-up.

Schematic representation of the Fukushima Daiichi nuclear accidents.

Fukushima Daiichi is 1 of 2 multi-reactor nuclear power sites in the Fukushima Prefecture of Japan. A nuclear disaster occurred there after a 9.0 magnitude earthquake and subsequent tsunami on 11 March 2011. The earthquake triggered a scram shut down of the three active reactors, and the ensuing tsunami crippled the site, stopped the backup diesel generators, and caused a station blackout. The subsequent lack of cooling led to explosions and meltdowns, with problems at three of the six reactors and in one of the six spent-fuel pools.

Times are given in Japan Standard Time (JST), unless noted, which is UTC plus nine hours.

== March 2011 ==
=== Monday, 7 March ===
Tokyo Electric Power Company (TEPCO) submits a report to Japan's nuclear safety agency which predicts the possibility of a tsunami up to 10.2 metres high at the Fukushima Daiichi nuclear plant in the event of an earthquake similar to the magnitude 7.2 earthquake with accompanying tsunami that devastated the area in 1896. TEPCO actually made this prediction in 2008 but delayed in submitting the report because they "did not feel the need to take prompt action on the estimates, which were still tentative calculations in the research stage".

=== Friday, 11 March ===
- 14:46: A 9.0 magnitude earthquake strikes off the coast of Honshu Island at a depth of about 24 kilometres (15 mi). The Fukushima I power plant's nuclear reactors 1, 2, and 3 are automatically shut down by the tremor. Nuclear reactors 4, 5, and 6 were undergoing routine maintenance and were not operating (reactor 4 was defueled in November 2010). The tremor also cut the power plant off from the Japanese electricity grid; however, backup diesel generators kicked in to continue cooling. See extract from earthquake log below (the numbers e.g. D564, indicate the PID controller triggering the log event).
- 14:46:46: 400 ms D564 Seismic (sensor) Trip
- 14:46:46: 410 ms D534 Reactor SCRM A Trip (Reactor A SCRAM started)
- 14:46:58: 420 ms D563 Seismic (sensor) Trip
- 14:46:58: 420 ms D535 Reactor SCRM B Trip (Reactor B SCRAM started)
- 14:47: A553 ALL CR FULL IN (all control rods full in) ON
- 14:47: G002 GENERATOR VOLT 18.56 > 18.50 kV (indicates the diesel generators are running above minimum voltage)
- 14:47: Nuclear reaction has stopped, however decay heat generation continues. At SCRAM, 6.5% of the previous output power is still generated, falling to 1.5% after an hour, and approximately 0.4% after 24 hours.
- 14:52: Reactor 1's emergency cooling system, which was capable of running without external power, turned on automatically.
- 15:03: Reactor 1's emergency cooling system was manually shut down to avoid reactor damage (temperature was not critical at this point). The operators followed the manual, shutting down the emergency cooling system as reactor temperature dropped sharply.
- 15:08: 7.4 magnitude aftershock
- 15:15: 7.7 magnitude aftershock
- 15:25: 7.5 magnitude aftershock
- 15:27: The first tsunami wave, of a series of seven waves, struck the plant. This wave was measured by the tidal gauge at 4 m (13 ft) and did not overcome the site design of 5.7 m (18.7 ft), being mitigated by the seawall.
- 15:30: The emergency condenser designed to cool the steam inside the pressure vessel of the No. 1 reactor fails.
- 15:35: A major wave arrives, exact height is unknown as the tidal gauge failed after providing a maximum reading of 7.5 m (24.5 ft). Estimates based on water damage on buildings indicate at least one wave arrived at the station of 14 m to 15 m approximately (46 to 49 ft). Water surged over the site to a depth of 4 m to 5 m (13 to 16 ft), Unit 1 reactor building and turbine hall were the lowest relative to sea level. Water flooded the turbine halls via generator air intakes, doors and once the surge reached the rear of the building, an access hatch. The basement housing the emergency diesel generators starts to flood, the generators being located at the seaward side (front) of the turbine halls basement, with switchgear adjacent. The battery room was located below the control room at the rear basement of the turbine hall, with switchgear adjacent. Sea water intake structures on the shoreline for all six units are unavailable due to damage to pumps, strainers and equipment and flooding caused electrical faults. The wave also washes away or damages the diesel fuel tanks, located on the floodplain. With the loss of all electrical power supply, the low-pressure core spray, the residual heat removal and low-pressure coolant injection system main pumps, and the automatic depressurization systems all failed (most of the emergency core cooling system). Only the steam-powered pump systems (isolation condenser in reactor 1, high-pressure coolant injection and reactor core isolation cooling system in reactors 2 and 3) remained available.
- 15:37: Unit 1 AC power lost
- 15:38: Unit 3 AC power lost
- 15:41: Unit 2 AC power lost
- Units 1 & 2 125-volt DC back-up batteries flooded and failed, Unit 3 batteries provide power for 30 more hours
- 15:46 (approximate): Reactors 1 to 4 lose both AC power (from the external grid, and internal emergency diesel generators), and DC power from the battery banks. Reactor 1 & 2 control room also loses all DC power. Electrical cooling pumps fail, electrically operated valves are disabled and instruments in the control room fail. Reactor 1 Isolation Condensor (IC) valves fail – close with loss of power, disabling the IC cooling system. Reactor decay heat is at approximately 1.5% prior output (22 MW Unit 1, 33 MW Units 2 & 3). This causes the reactor temperature and pressure to start rising.

According to a report in the New York Times, "... at the start of the crisis Friday, immediately after the shattering earthquake, Fukushima plant officials focused their attention on a damaged storage pool for spent nuclear fuel at the No. 2 reactor at Daiichi, said a nuclear executive who requested anonymity ... The damage prompted the plant's management to divert much of the attention and pumping capacity to that pool, the executive added. The shutdown of the other reactors then proceeded badly, and problems began to cascade."

- 16:00: The Nuclear and Industrial Safety Agency of Japan (NISA) initiates an emergency headquarters in an attempt to gather information on the 55 nuclear reactors in Japan. There is no report that radiation was detected outside power-plant borders.
- 18:00 (estimated): The falling water level in reactor 1 reaches the top of the fuel, and the core temperature starts climbing.
- 18:18: Operators attempted to start reactor 1's emergency cooling system, but it did not function.
- 19:03: Prime Minister Naoto Kan declares a nuclear emergency status announced by Yukio Edano, Chief Cabinet officer in Japan. Japanese government officials try to comfort the people of Japan by telling them that the proper procedures are being undertaken. They also announce that no radioactive leaks have been detected.
- 19:30 (estimated): The fuel in reactor 1 becomes fully exposed above the water surface, and fuel damage in the central core begins soon after.
- 21:00: An evacuation order is issued by the government to persons within a radius of 3 kilometres (1.9 mi) from the Fukushima I station. Those within a radius of 10 kilometres (6.2 mi) are told that they can remain in their homes, and carry on with regular activities, until told otherwise. TEPCO announces that the pressure inside reactor unit 1 of Fukushima I is more than twice normal levels.
- 21:00: The first mobile generator sets arrive onsite, further units arriving through the night. Workers check motors and switchgear in attempt to restart cooling of the reactors, testing reveals Unit 2 standby liquid control (SLC) pumps to be undamaged, the first mobile generator is placed adjacent to Unit 2 and workers start to run cable to the SLC pump distribution panel.

=== Saturday, 12 March ===
Overview map showing evacuation and other zone progression and selected radiation levels.

- 05:30: In order to release some of the pressure inside the containment at unit 1, the decision is made to vent some of the steam (which contained a small amount of radioactive material) into the air, despite the risk of hydrogen (produced from the water in the reactor) igniting after combining with oxygen.
- 05:50: Fresh water injection into reactor 1 is started.
- 06:50: Although unknown at the time, the core of reactor 1 has now completely melted and falls to the bottom of the reactor pressure vessel.
- 10:09: TEPCO confirms that a small amount of vapor has been released into the air to release pressure in reactor unit 1 at Fukushima I.
- 10:58: Pressure remains too high inside reactor unit 2 at Fukushima I. In order to alleviate some of this pressure, a decision is made to vent radioactive vapor into the air.
- 14:00: Operators open the containment venting line of unit 1 and receive confirmation of steam release to the atmosphere at 14:30.
- 14:50: Fresh water injection into reactor 1 is halted.
- 15:30: Evacuation of residents within 3 km of Fukushima II and within 10 km of Fukushima I is underway.
- 15:30: Workers complete connection cabling to the Unit 2 SLC pumps, powering up the mobile generator outside Unit 2.
- 15:36: There is a massive hydrogen explosion in the reactor building of unit 1. The primary containment is not damaged, but there is extensive damage to the secondary containment (the reactor building). Five workers are injured.

The mobile generator and cabling to Unit 2 SLC pump are damaged. Hoses providing seawater injection to Unit 1 and Unit 2 are also damaged in the blast. Debris covers the site, some of which is highly radioactive. Workers are evacuated to the Emergency Response Center for headcounts and for the wounded to be treated.

- 19:00: Seawater injection into reactor 1 is started. TEPCO orders Daiichi to cease seawater injection at 19:25, but Daiichi plant boss Masao Yoshida orders workers to continue with the seawater injection.
- 21:40: The evacuation zone around Fukushima I is extended to 20 km, and the evacuation zone around Fukushima II is extended to 10 km.

To release pressure within reactor unit 1 at Fukushima I, steam containing water vapor, hydrogen, oxygen and some radioactive material is released out of the unit into the air.

TEPCO engineers decided to directly inject seawater inside the pressure vessel of the reactors using firetrucks. The pressure relief was also necessary to allow the firemen to inject seawater into the reactors vessels.

=== Sunday, 13 March ===
- 02:42: The high pressure coolant injection system for reactor 3 stops and, shortly thereafter, the water level within the reactor starts falling.
- 05:10: Fukushima I Unit 1 is declared as an INES Level-4 "accident with local consequences" event.
- 07:00 (approximate): The water level in reactor 3 reaches the top of the fuel.
- 09:00: Core damage starts occurring in reactor 3.

A partial meltdown was reported to be possible at unit 3. At 13:00 JST reactors 1 and 3 are vented to release overpressure and then re-filled with water and boric acid for cooling, and to inhibit further nuclear reactions. Unit 2 was possibly suffering a lower than normal water level, but was thought to be stable; although pressure inside the containment vessel was high. The Japan Atomic Energy Agency announced that it was rating the situation at unit 1 as level 4 (an accident with local consequences) on the International Nuclear and Radiological Event Scale.

=== Monday, 14 March ===
- 11:01: The unit 3 reactor building explodes. According to TEPCO, there was no release of radioactive material beyond that already being vented, but blast damage affected the water supply to unit 2. 11 workers were injured in the explosion.
- 13:15: The reactor core isolation cooling system for reactor 2 stops and, shortly afterwards, the water level within the reactor starts falling.
- 15:00: A major part of the fuel in reactor 3 drops to the bottom of the reactor pressure vessel.
- 18:00 (approximate): The water level in reactor 2 reaches the top of the fuel.
- 20:00: Core damage starts occurring in reactor 2.

The president of the French nuclear safety authority, Autorité de sûreté nucléaire (ASN), said that the accident should be rated as a 5 (an accident with wider consequences) or even a 6 (a serious accident) on INES.

=== Tuesday, 15 March ===
- 06:00 (approx.): According to TEPCO, an explosion damaged the 4th floor area above the reactor and spent-fuel pool of the Unit 4 reactor.
- 20:00: A majority of the fuel in reactor 2 drops to the bottom of the reactor pressure vessel.

Damage to the temporary cooling systems on unit 2 from the explosion in unit 3, plus problems with its venting system, meant that water could not be added to the extent that unit 2 was in the most severe condition of the three reactors. Initially, it was thought that an explosion had occurred at unit 2 because its pressure indicator dropped at the same time as unit 4 exploded. However, later it was confirmed that there was no explosion at unit 2. A fire breaks out at unit 4. Radiation levels at the plant rise significantly but subsequently fall. Radiation equivalent dose rates of 400 millisieverts per hour (400 mSv/h) are observed at one location in the vicinity of unit 3.

=== Wednesday, 16 March ===
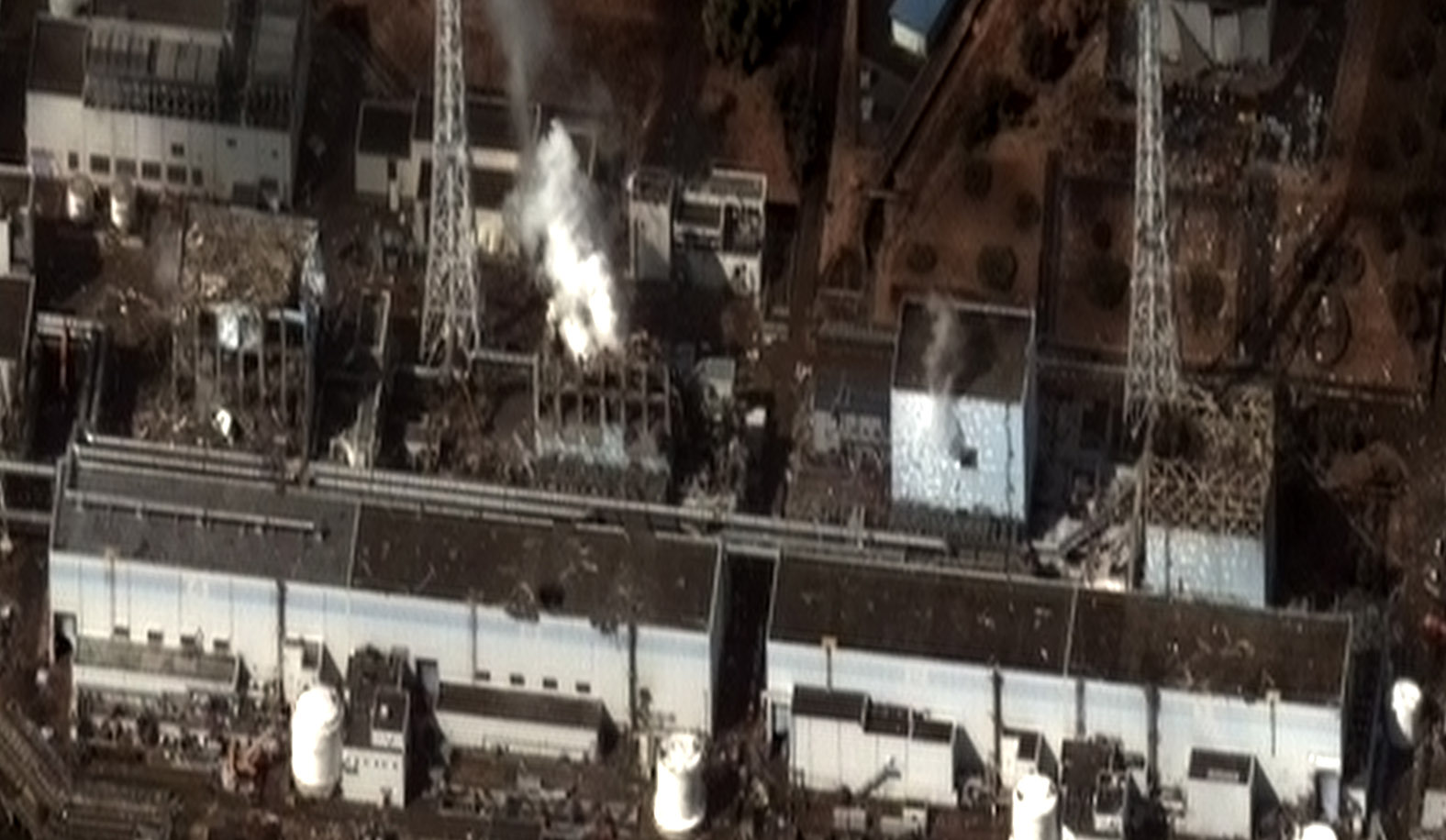
Reactors 4, 3, 2 and 1 (left to right), seen damaged on 16 March 2011

At approximately 14:30 TEPCO announces its belief that the fuel rod storage pool of unit 4 – which is located outside the containment area – may have begun boiling. By midday NHK TV is reporting white smoke rising from the Fukushima I plant, which officials suggest is likely coming from reactor 3. Shortly afterwards all but a small group of remaining workers at the plant are placed on standby because of the radiation rising to a dangerous level of up to 1 Sv/h. TEPCO temporarily suspended operations at the facility. A TEPCO press release states that workers had been withdrawn at 06:00 because of abnormal noises coming from one of the reactor pressure suppression chambers. Late in the evening Reuters reports that water is being poured into reactors 5 and 6.

=== Thursday, 17 March ===
During the morning Self-Defense Force helicopters drop water four times on the spent-fuel pools of units 3 and 4. They measure radiation field of 3.75 Sv/h above Unit 3. In the afternoon it is reported that the unit 4 spent-fuel pool was filled with water and none of the fuel rods were exposed. Construction work is started to supply a working external electrical power source to all six units of Fukushima I. Starting at 7 pm, police and fire water trucks attempt to spray water into the unit 3 reactor with high pressure hoses. Japanese authorities inform the IAEA that engineers are laying an external grid power line cable to unit 2. After watching the helicopter effort on TV Kazunori Hasegawa, president of Chuo Construction, calls the government and offers the use of his two truck-mounted concrete boom pumps to spray water directly into the reactors. TEPCO did not respond for three days, and then stated it would wait for the arrival of similar pumps obtained elsewhere.

=== Friday, 18 March ===
Tokyo Fire Department dispatches thirty fire engines with 139 fire-fighters and a trained rescue team at approximately 03:00 JST, including a fire truck with a 22-metre water tower. For the second consecutive day, high radiation levels are detected in an area 30 kilometres (19 mi) northwest of the damaged Fukushima I nuclear plant at 150 μSv/h. Japanese authorities upgrade INES ratings for cooling loss and core damage at unit 1 to level 5, and issue the same rating for units 2 and 3. The loss of fuel pool cooling water at unit 4 is classified as a level 3. In a 24-hour period ending at 11 am local time, radiation levels near the plant decline from 351.4 to 265 μSv/h, but it is unclear if the water spraying efforts were the cause of the decrease.

=== Saturday, 19 March ===
A second group of 100 Tokyo and 53 Osaka firefighters replaces the previous team. They use a vehicle that projects water from a height of 22 meters to cool spent nuclear fuel in the storage pool inside the reactor of unit 3. Water is sprayed into the reactor for a total of 7 hours during the day.

=== Sunday, 20 March ===
External power is reconnected to unit 2, but work continues to make the equipment operational. Repaired diesel generators at unit 6 provide power to restart the cooling on units 5 and 6, both of which are returned to cold shutdown and their fuel cooling ponds returned to normal operating temperatures. TEPCO announces that the pressure in reactor 3's containment vessel is rising, and that it might be necessary to vent air containing radioactive particles to relieve pressure, as reported by Japanese broadcaster NHK at 1:06. The operation is later aborted as TEPCO deems it unnecessary. While joining in a generally positive assessment of progress toward overall control, Japanese chief cabinet secretary Edano confirms, for the first time, that the heavily damaged and contaminated complex will be closed once the crisis is over.

=== Monday, 21 March ===
Ongoing repair work is interrupted by a recurrence of grey smoke from the south-east side of unit 3 (the general area of the spent-fuel pool) seen at 15:55 and dying down by 17:55. Employees are evacuated from unit 3, but no changes in radiation measurements or reactor status are seen. No work was going on at the time (such as restoring power) which might have accounted for the fire. White smoke, probably steam, is also seen coming from unit 2 at 18:22 JST, accompanied by a temporary rise in radiation levels. A new power line is laid to unit 4 and unit 5 is transferred to its own external power from a transmission line instead of sharing the unit 6 diesel generators.

Officials learn that the crisis will not end with power recovery as the cooling pumps are damaged beyond repair and must be replaced. An emergency order was placed for new pumps for unit 2 which had suffered less damage than units 1 and 3.

=== Tuesday, 22 March ===
Smoke is still rising from units 2 and 3, but is less visible, and is theorized to be steam following operations to spray water onto the buildings. Repair work resumes, after having been halted because of concerns over the smoke; it is felt safe because no significant changes in radiation levels have occurred. Work continues to restore electricity, and a supply cable is connected to unit 4. Injection of seawater into units 1–3 continues. External power cables are reported to be connected to all six units and lighting is back on again in the control room of unit 3.

=== Wednesday, 23 March ===
Smoke again starts belching from reactor 3 in the late afternoon, this time black and grey smoke, causing another evacuation of workers from around the area. Aerial video from the plant shows what appears to be a small fire at the base of the smoke plumes in the heavily damaged reactor building. Feed water systems in unit 1 are restored allowing an increase in the rate that water can be added to the reactor. The Japanese Chief Cabinet Secretary also advises that high levels of radioactivity have been found in Tokyo's drinking water and that it should not be used to reconstitute baby formula as it is around twice the legal limit for children.

=== Thursday, 24 March ===
Seawater injection to units 1, 2 and 3 continues, and radiation levels near the plant decline to 200 μSv/h, while lighting is restored to the unit 1 control room. Three workers are exposed to high levels of radiation which cause two of them to require hospital treatment, after radioactive water seeps through their protective clothes. The workers are exposed to an estimated equivalent dose of 2–6 Sv to the skin below their ankles. They were not wearing protective boots, as their employing firm's safety manuals "did not assume a scenario in which its employees would carry out work standing in water at a nuclear power plant". The activity concentration of the water is about 3.9 GBq/L. Infra-red surveys of the reactor buildings, obtained by helicopter, show that the temperatures of units 1, 2, 3 and 4 continue to decrease, ranging from 11–17 °C, and the fuel pool at unit 3 is recorded at 30 °C.

=== Friday, 25 March ===
NISA announces a possible breach in the containment vessel of the unit 3 reactor, though radioactive water in the basement might alternatively have come from the fuel storage pool. Highly radioactive water is also found in the turbine buildings of units 1 and 2. The US Navy sends a barge with 1,890 cubic metres (500,000 US gal) of fresh water, expected to arrive after two days. Japan announces transportation will be provided in a voluntary evacuation zone of 30 kilometres (19 mi). Tap water is reported to be safe for infants in Tokyo and Chiba by Japanese authorities, but still exceeds limits in Hitachi and Tokaimura. Iodine-131 in the ocean near the plant measures 50,000 Bq/L, 1,250 times normal levels.

=== Saturday, 26 March ===
Fresh water becomes available again for use instead of seawater to top up reactor water levels. The fresh water is provided by two United States Navy barges holding a total of 2,280 metric tons of fresh water which were towed by the Japan Maritime Self-Defense Force from the United States Fleet Activities Yokosuka Naval Base to Fukushima. Radiation levels near the plant decline to a still relatively high 170 μSv/h.

=== Sunday, 27 March ===
Levels of "over 1000" and 750 mSv/h are reported from water within unit 2 (but outside the containment structure) and 3 respectively. Japan's Nuclear and Industrial Safety Agency indicate that "The level of radiation is greater than 1,000 millisieverts. It is certain that it comes from atomic fission ... But we are not sure how it came from the reactor." The high radiation levels cause delays for technicians working to restore the water cooling systems for the troubled reactors. United States Air Force technicians at Yokota Air Base complete the fabrication of compatibility valves to allow the connection of deployed pump systems to the existing infrastructure at Fukushima. An aerial video recorded by a Ground Self-Defense Force helicopter reveals, according to NHK, the clearest and most detailed view of the damaged plant to date. Significant observations include:

- White vapour, possibly steam, emanating from the buildings of reactors 2, 3, and 4.
- The roof of the reactor 2 building has been badly damaged but is still intact.

=== Monday, 28 March ===
The Japanese Nuclear Safety Commission states that it "assumed" melted fuel rods in unit 2 have released radioactive substances into the coolant water, which subsequently leaked through an unknown route to the unit 2 turbine building basement. To reduce the amount of leaking water, TEPCO reduced the amount of water pumped into the unit 2 reactor, from 16 tons per hour to 7 tons per hour, which could lead to higher reactor temperatures. The highly radioactive water halts work on restoring the cooling pumps and other powered systems to reactors 1–4. TEPCO confirms finding low levels of plutonium in five samples during 21 and 22 March. Enriched levels of Plutonium-238, relative to Plutonium-239 and Plutonium-240, at two of the sites in the plant (solid waste area and field) indicate that contamination has occurred at those sites due to the "recent incident". Nonetheless, the overall levels of plutonium for all samples are about the same as background Pu levels resulting from atmospheric nuclear bomb testing in the past.

=== Tuesday, 29 March ===
TEPCO continues to spray water into reactors 1–3 and discovers that radioactive runoff water is beginning to fill utility trenches outside the three reactor buildings. The highly radioactive water in and around the reactor buildings continues to limit progress of the technicians in restoring the cooling and other automated systems to the reactors.

=== Wednesday, 30 March ===
At a news conference TEPCO Chairman Tsunehisa Katsumata announces that it is unclear how the problems at the plant will be resolved. An immediate difficulty is the removal of large quantities of radioactive water in the basement buildings, but also salt build up inside the reactors, from using seawater for cooling, will need to be removed. Building concrete walls to enclose the reactors in a shield is being considered, as had been done at Chernobyl. The Environmental Protection Agency (EPA) finds traces of radioactive iodine in milk in the United States. The amount is "well below levels of public health concerns".

=== Thursday, 31 March ===
Workers pump radioactive water from a utility trench near reactor 1 into a storage tank near reactor 4. Water in the condensers for reactors 2 and 3 is shifted to outside storage tanks so that the condensers can remove more contaminated water from inside the reactors. The world's largest concrete pumping truck is shipped from the United States to Fukushima. The truck has been slightly modified to be able to pump cooling water initially, then will later possibly to be used to pump concrete for any eventual permanent containment structure. A 62-metre-tall pumping truck, donated by Chinese manufacturer SANY is also used.

== April 2011 ==
=== Friday, 1 April ===
TEPCO says that groundwater near unit 1 contains radioiodine at levels 10,000 times normal, but NISA later disputes the numbers. The Japanese government is reported to be considering injecting nitrogen into the reactor vessels. Two more concrete pumping trucks, used initially to pump cooling water, are shipped to Japan from the Putzmeister factory in Germany.

=== Saturday, 2 April ===
TEPCO observes for the first time that contaminated water from the unit 2 is flowing into the sea. Workers discover a crack about 20 cm (8 inches) wide in the maintenance pit, which lies between the reactor 2 and the sea, and holds cables used to power seawater pumps. Workers were preparing to pour concrete into the crack to stop the water, which was emitting radiation at 1 Sv/h.

=== Sunday, 3 April ===
The attempt to plug the leak near unit 2 fails when the concrete fails to set. TEPCO then reattempts to plug up the trench that leads to the damaged storage pit with a combination of superabsorbent polymer, sawdust and shredded newspaper, which also fails. Radioactive water continues to leak into the sea. Radiation levels around the plant are estimated at 1 Sv/h and continue to decrease.

TEPCO confirms the first deaths at the Fukushima facility, two workers who had been missing since 11 March and appear to have died in the basement of reactor 4 from bleeding due to multiple injuries inflicted by the tsunami.

Japanese government officials say the Daiichi plant may continue to release dangerous radiation into the air for several months.

=== Monday, 4 April ===
TEPCO begins dumping water from storage tanks tainted with low levels of radioactivity into the Pacific Ocean on Monday night. Officials say this is needed to make room in a central waste facility to store water with a higher radioactive level. This more highly radioactive water is preventing workers from making progress on restoring the cooling and other systems to reactors 1–4. Samples of seawater near the plant reveal radioactive caesium at 1.1 million times the legal limit.

The company says it could release up to 11,500 tons of radioactive water into the sea. A spokeswoman for Japan's Nuclear and Industrial Safety Agency says the less-contaminated water must be disposed of so that workers can secure a place to store more highly contaminated water on the site.

Engineers consider plans to inject inert nitrogen gas into the containment buildings of units 1, 2 and 3 to expel atmospheric oxygen and to dilute accumulated hydrogen, which combine explosively.

=== Tuesday, 5 April ===
It is determined that the leak into the cable storage pit from unit 2 was likely due to a faulty joint where the pit meets a duct. The pit leads to a gravel layer beneath, resulting in highly radioactive water pouring directly into the sea.

Levels of radioactive iodine-131 in seawater near the facility are found to be 7.5 million times the legal limit. TEPCO drills a hole into the pit near reactor 2, from which highly radioactive water is leaking, and injects water glass (sodium silicate) into the pit to prevent further leaking.

=== Wednesday, 6 April ===
TEPCO announces that an injection of 6,000 litres (1,600 US gal) of polymer coagulant into the pit mitigated the leaking; however, the IAEA and others credit additional factors. Sodium silicate ("water glass") and additives are injected into the ground in order to stop the leakage of radioactive water. The residual heat carried by the water used for cooling the damaged reactors accelerates the setting of the injected mixture.

Despite protests from the South Korean government, Russian scientists, and Japanese fishermen, Japan authorizes the release of 11,500 tonnes (12,700 tons) of less radioactive water into the ocean to make room to store the more highly contaminated water.

Iodine-131 levels reach 7.5 million times the legal limit in a seawater sample taken near the facility.

TEPCO announces that the leak of highly radioactive water from the utility pit near reactor 2 has stopped. According to U.S. Representative Ed Markey, the Nuclear Regulatory Commission says that the core of unit 2 has become so hot that part of it has melted through the reactor pressure vessel; however, a NRC spokesperson says, "That's not clear to us, nor is it clear to us that the reactor has penetrated the vessel." TEPCO begins injection of nitrogen into unit 1 to lower the possibility of hydrogen explosions.

=== Thursday, 7 April ===
Nitrogen injection into the pressure containment vessel of unit 1 commences at 01:31.

Workers are evacuated following a magnitude 7.1 aftershock off the north-eastern coast of Japan, 118 kilometers from the plant. TEPCO reports communications and power were not affected and no additional damage was observed as a result. A tsunami warning is also issued, but is lifted after 90 minutes. Most of the workers at the nuclear plant were evacuated.

Official measures at Fukushima I reactor unit 1, however, show a rise in temperature following the aftershock and a spiking amount of radiation in the Dry Well, which exceeds the instrument maximum of 100 Sv/h. Gauge B, in the meantime, records a steady increase in pressure for the previous ten days in the same reactor. Reporting the rise to 100 Sv/h from the earlier 30 Sv/h, TEPCO declares that the "validity of the measurement is questioned" both for radiation levels and pressure.

=== Friday, 8 April ===
Before the crisis evaluation was elevated by Japanese authorities to level 7, the highest level, experts already recognized that Fukushima is the most complicated nuclear accident.

	Unit 1	Unit 2	Unit 3	Unit 4	Unit 5	Unit 6
Fuel integrity	Damaged (70% estimated)	Damaged (30% estimated)	Damaged (25% estimated)	Spent fuel possibly damaged	Not damaged	Not damaged
Reactor pressure vessel integrity	Unknown	Unknown	Unknown	Not damaged (defueled)	Not damaged	Not damaged
Containment integrity	Not damaged (estimation)	Damage and leakage suspected	Not damaged (estimation)	Not damaged	Not damaged	Not damaged
Core cooling system 1 (ECCS/RHR)	Not functional	Not functional	Not functional	Not necessary (defueled)	Functional	Functional
Core cooling system 2 (RCIC/MUWC)	Not functional	Not functional	Not functional	Not necessary (defueled)	Functional (in cold shutdown)	Functional (in cold shutdown)
Building integrity	Severely damaged due to hydrogen explosion	Slightly damaged, also panel removed to prevent hydrogen explosion	Severely damaged due to hydrogen explosion	Severely damaged due to hydrogen explosion	Panel removed to prevent hydrogen explosion	Panel removed to prevent hydrogen explosion
Pressure vessel, water level	Fuel exposed partially or fully	Fuel exposed partially or fully	Fuel exposed partially or fully	Safe (defueled)	Safe (in cold shutdown)	Safe (in cold shutdown)
Pressure vessel, pressure (Two instrument trains)	Increasing to 0.456 MPa absolute (Train A) / 0.836 MPa absolute (Train B – suspected faulty) at 7 April 02:00 JST	Stable at 0.090 MPa absolute (Train A) / 0.083 MPa absolute (Train B) at 7 April 02:00 JST	Stable at 0.103 MPa absolute (Train A) / 0.022 MPa absolute (Train C) at 7 April 02:00 JST	Safe (defueled)	Safe (in cold shutdown)	Safe (in cold shutdown)
Pressure vessel, temperature	Stable at 224 °C on 7 April	Stable at 143 °C on 7 April	Stable at 115 °C on 7 April	Safe (defueled)	Safe (in cold shutdown)	Safe (in cold shutdown)
Containment pressure	Stable at 0.150 MPa (absolute) at 7 April 02:00 JST	Stable at atmospheric pressure on 6 April	Stable at 0.1071 MPa (absolute) at 7 April 02:00 JST	Safe	Safe	Safe
Seawater injection into core	Continuing (switched to freshwater 25 March)	Continuing (switched to freshwater 26 March)	Continuing (switched to freshwater 25 March)	Not necessary (defueled)	Not necessary	Not necessary
Seawater injection into containment vessel	To be decided	To be decided	To be decided	Not necessary	Not necessary	Not necessary
Containment venting	Temporarily stopped	Temporarily stopped	Temporarily stopped	Not necessary	Not necessary	Not necessary
INES	Level 5	Level 5	Level 5	Level 3	–	–
Environmental effect	Radiation levels: South side of office building: 650 μSv/hour at 8 April 15:00 JST; Main gate: 94 μSv/hour at 8 April 15:00 JST; West gate: 40 μSv/hour at 8 April 15:00 JST; Levels of radioactive iodine 4,385 times higher than regulatory limits were detected in seawater samples on 30 March; Levels of radioactive iodine 7.5 million times higher than regulatory limits were detected in seawater samples near the unit 2 water intake on 2 April; On 2 April highly radioactive (over 1 Sv/hour) water was discovered leaking from a concrete structure housing electrical cables into the sea through cracks in the concrete wall; as of 6 April this leakage has been stopped; On 4 April the release of 10,000 tons of low-level radioactive waste water began in order to make room for the highly radioactive water discovered on 2 April; Radioactive material was detected in underground water sampled near the turbine buildings on 30 March; Radioactive material has been detected in milk and agricultural products from Fukushima and neighboring prefectures, prompting government limits on shipments (21 March) and intake (23 March) for some products; Radioactive iodine was found in tap water in some prefectures between 21 and 27 March, prompting government warnings not to drink the water in those regions; as of 2 April these warnings have been lifted; Levels of radioactive caesium above regulatory limits were detected in small fish caught off the coast of Ibaraki on 4 April					
Evacuation radius	20 km from the nuclear power station, but 30 km should consider leaving as of 25 March 11:30 JST					
General status from all sources regarding reactor cores	Stabilized by injecting sea water and boron	Stabilized by injecting sea water and boron	Stabilized by injecting sea water and boron; pressure elevated on 20 March	Defueled	Cold shutdown on 20 March 14:30 JST	Cold shutdown on 20 March 19:27 JST
General status from all sources regarding Spent-Fuel Pools	Sprayed freshwater injection started, 60 °C on 20 March by infrared helicopter measurement	Freshwater injection continues, 71.0 °C on 5 April 06:00 JST	Sprayed freshwater injection continues, 60 °C on 20 March by infrared helicopter measurement	Sprayed freshwater injection continues after hydrogen explosion from pool on 15 March 40 °C on 20 March by infrared helicopter measurement	Cooling system restored, 34.8 °C on 4 April 13:00 JST	Cooling system restored, 27.5 °C on 4 April 13:00 JST
Information sources

=== Saturday, 9 April ===
Japan struggles to keep water on the reactors to cool them and prevent further meltdown. Russian Antonov An-124 cargo planes fly out of Atlanta and Los Angeles, each carrying a huge concrete boom pump. The two 95-ton boom pumps, which TEPCO purchased for $2 million each, can be operated from two miles away by remote control. Each boom pump can direct focused streams of water into the damaged reactors.

TEPCO does not plan to take a Chernobyl approach to resolving the nuclear power plant crisis by entombing the radioactive material in concrete. If this decision were to change, the boom pumps could be retrofitted to deliver concrete for that purpose.

Prior to the elevation to level 7 by the Japanese authorities James Acton, Associate of the Nuclear Policy Program at the Carnegie Endowment for International Peace, was of the opinion that "Fukushima is not the worst nuclear accident ever but it is the most complicated and the most dramatic, This [sic] was a crisis that played out in real time on TV. Chernobyl did not."

A survey of radiation in seawater outside unit 2 shows radioactive isotope concentrations (iodine-131, caesium-134 and caesium-137) falling for the third consecutive day since the leak was plugged. However, the levels are still high at several thousand times legal levels. Other nuclides are being investigated, but Japanese regulator NISA has flagged problems with TEPCO's sampling methodology.

=== Monday, 11 April ===
Coolant injection into reactors 1 and 3 is interrupted for 50 minutes due to a loss of power after a strong earthquake in the region.

Workers plan to pump water into turbine condensers, but need to pump water out of them first. Work to transfer water from the unit 2 and unit 1 condensers to a central storage tank was completed on 9 and 10 April. Workers have also knocked holes through the turbine hall buildings of units 2 and 4 to accommodate hoses for the water transfer. At unit 3, work continues to make space for water in the turbine condenser by pumping existing water into other tanks. Japanese news wire NHK reports that workers are laying hoses to transfer water to an LLW waste processing facility, which continues to be inspected. TEPCO says that it cannot start work switching on emergency systems on site until the turbine hall is dry. NHK also reported that radioactive water filling a tunnel near unit 2 has risen 12 cm since a leak in a trench was stopped on Wednesday 6 April.

=== Tuesday, 12 April ===
Japan officially raises Fukushima to INES Level 7, the same as Chernobyl. This new rating considers the accidents as a single event and uses estimated total release to the atmosphere as a justification.

Following the hydrogen explosion in the reactor 1 building on 12 March and releases from the reactor 3 building, the equivalent of 190,000 terabecquerels of radioactive iodine had been released from the reactor buildings by 15 March, according to calculations by the Nuclear Safety Commission of Japan. A terabecquerel is equivalent to 1 trillion becquerels. The high level meant that by 15 March the Fukushima plant accident had already reached the worst level 7 on the International Nuclear and Radiological Event Scale, matching the assessment given to the 1986 Chernobyl nuclear disaster. Since that time the Fukushima reactors have continued to emit radiation; including atmospheric, water, and gamma ray releases.

At Chernobyl, approximately 10 times the amount of radiation was released into the atmosphere as was released from Fukushima I through 12 April 2011. The total amount of radioactive material still stored at Fukushima is about 8 times that stored at Chernobyl, and leakage at Fukushima continues.

After cooling efforts at spent-fuel pool 4 were halted, due to an erroneous warning about the pool filling up, the temperature of the pool rises to 90 °C and the dose rate 6 meters above the pool spikes at 84 mSv/h.

=== Friday, 15 April ===
Nuclear fuel is reported to have melted and fallen to the lower containment sections of reactors 1, 2 and 3. The melted material is not expected to breach a container (which might cause a massive radiation release). Instead, the melted fuel is thought to have dispersed fairly uniformly across the lower portions of the containers of the three reactors, which would make the resumption of the fission process, to the extent of a recriticality accident, 'most unlikely'; however, it is only during future dismantling of the three damaged reactors that it would be possible to verify this hypothesis and to know what really occurred inside the reactor cores.

=== Saturday, 16 April ===
Plans are announced for a large-scale study on the environmental and health effects of radioactive contamination from the nuclear plant. Academics and researchers from across Japan will work with the Fukushima Prefectural Government starting in May.

=== Monday, 18 April ===
The Associated Press reports that two PackBot ground robots from iRobot have entered unit 1 and unit 3 of the crippled Fukushima nuclear power plant and performed temperature, pressure, and radioactivity measurements. The remote-controlled robots entered the two reactors over the preceding weekend. The devices opened closed doors and explored the insides of the reactor buildings, coming back with radioactivity readings of up to 49 mSv/h inside unit 1 and up to 57 mSv/h inside unit 3. TEPCO officials say that the radiation data from the robots do not change their plans for shutting down the plant by the end of this year. Though more robots will be used, a TEPCO official, Takeshi Makigami, says that robots are limited in what they can do, and eventually "people must enter the buildings". Robots also entered unit 2, but the probe was hindered by fogging of the robot's camera lens from the high humidity, over 90%, inside the building.

Test spraying of an "anti-scattering agent" on the ground to prevent further spread of radioactive materials from the site is carried out over an area of about 1200 m^{2}.

=== Tuesday, 19 April ===
TEPCO begins transferring excess radioactive cooling water from the reactor 2's basement and maintenance tunnels to a waste processing facility. Operations to pump radioactive water in the basements of buildings of units 1, 2, 3 and their associated tunnels start with unit 2.

=== Friday, 22 April ===
Japanese Prime Minister Naoto Kan states additional towns might be asked to evacuate, which largely involves agricultural lands. The government also plans to build 30,000 temporary homes by the end of May, and an additional 70,000 will follow.

The president of the Tokyo Electric Power Company (TEPCO), Masataka Shimizu, formally apologizes at the prefectural government office in Fukushima to the Fukushima Governor Yuhei Sato for the nuclear crisis following the 11 March 2011 earthquake and tsunamis. In response, the Governor requests better working conditions for the workers.

=== Tuesday, 26 April ===
To prevent the proliferation of dust, TEPCO initiates spraying a synthetic resin to contain contaminated dust.

=== Wednesday, 27 April ===
Junichi Matsumoto, a general manager at Tokyo Electric Power Co., reports that radiation readings taken by two iRobot PackBot robots inside the reactor 1 building are as high as 1120 mSv/h, the highest level disclosed to date.

== May 2011 ==
=== Monday, 2 May ===
T. Matsui of the University of Tokyo Institute of Physics releases a scientific paper analysing the ratio of iodine-131 to caesium-137 taken from water samples, which concludes that a recriticality may have occurred at least 10–15 days after the attempted shutdown.

=== Thursday, 5 May ===
Workers enter the reactor 1 building. This is the first time since the start of the crisis that a reactor building in the plant is visited by a human being. The workers will connect a ventilation system that should absorb radiation inside the building for the next 4–5 days, allowing them to start installation of the cooling system replacement. Because of protective gear, the workers are only exposed to a small amount of radiation (about 2 mSv). TEPCO expects to bring the plant into a cold shutdown within six to nine months. IAEA releases a briefing.

=== Tuesday, 10 May ===
In a press release, TEPCO reports that levels of caesium-134, caesium-136, caesium-137, and iodine-131 (half-life of ~8 days), had spiked since last sampled on 2 March 2011, when these four nuclides were below detection limits. TEPCO's report gives the newly measured concentration (Bq/cm^{3}) of each nuclide as of sampling date, 8 May.

=== Thursday, 12 May ===
TEPCO engineers confirm that a meltdown occurred, with molten fuel having fallen to the bottom of the reactor's containment vessel. The utility says fuel rods of the No. 1 reactor are fully exposed with the water level 1 meter (3.3 feet) below the base of the fuel assembly. The government and TEPCO are described as "consistently appeared to be underestimating the severity of the situation." According to a Japanese press report, there are holes in the base of the pressure vessel, and most of the fuel has likely melted. The nuclear fuel has possibly leaked into the containment vessel, which was damaged by an explosion during the crisis. However, the Nuclear Energy Institute, a nuclear lobbying firm, states that the situation "is in no way alarming. It was anticipated that there was fuel damage in reactors 1, 2 and 3. This is confirmation."

=== Saturday, 14 May ===
A third TEPCO (contractor) employee dies, after falling ill at 06:50, being brought to the plant's medical room unconscious. The likely cause of death is a heart attack. TEPCO says he was exposed to 0.17 millisieverts of radiation on Saturday.

=== Sunday, 15 May ===
A robot sent to the first floor of unit 1 records a radiation level of 2,000 mSv/h. At this level, workers would only be allowed to stay in the area for 8 minutes. In addition, the reactor's containment vessel is leaking large amounts of water into the basement. A TEPCO worker is able to peer into the basement and determines that the 11 m deep basement is approximately half full of water.

TEPCO releases a report on the core status of reactor 1, revealing that fuel elements had become exposed above the water just 4 hours after the earthquake and SCRAM, and had fully melted after 16 hours.

=== Wednesday, 18 May ===
Four workers in protective suits and SCBA enter unit 2 for the first time since the 15 March explosion, to check on radiation levels and other conditions inside the building. The workers receive a dose of between 3 and 4 mSv each.

=== Friday, 20 May ===
TEPCO president Masataka Shimizu resigns after reporting the largest financial losses in the company's history.

=== Sunday, 22 May ===
TEPCO reports that reactor 3 leaked at least 250 tons of radioactive water into the Pacific Ocean over a period of 41 hours beginning on 10 May 2011.

=== Tuesday, 24 May ===
On the eve of the arrival in Tokyo of a delegation from the International Atomic Energy Agency, TEPCO admits that the cores of reactor 2 and reactor 3 also melted in the days immediately following the earthquake in mid-March 2011. 16 hours after the earthquake and SCRAM, the fuel rods of reactor 1 had "mostly melted and fallen into a lump at the bottom of the pressure vessel – a state that TEPCO officials have described as a 'meltdown'". A TEPCO spokesman Yoshimi Hitosugi stated last night, "The situation inside two and three is almost the same." TEPCO further stated that the fuel in reactor three took about 60 hours to melt and that the reactor melted down 100 hours after the magnitude nine quake struck.

=== Wednesday, 25 May ===
TEPCO informs the Nuclear and Industrial Safety Agency and the government of Fukushima Prefecture of the results of soil tests for plutonium (^{238}Pu, ^{239}Pu and ^{240}Pu) carried out around the Fukushima Daiichi plant. While the levels were comparable to the fallout in Japan from atmospheric nuclear testing, TEPCO deemed that the plutonium had originated from the accidents.

=== Saturday, 28 May ===
TEPCO informs the Nuclear and Industrial Safety Agency and the government of Fukushima Prefecture of the results of soil tests for uranium (^{234}U, ^{235}U and ^{238}U) carried out around the Fukushima Daiichi plant. The uranium found was considered to be natural, as its isotope ratios were consistent with the natural abundance.

At 21:14 a cooling pump at reactor five stops. At 08:12 the next day, work began on a spare pump, and cooling was restored at 12:49. The reactor temperature had risen to 92.2 °C. The cause of the outage is suspected to be motor failure.

=== Sunday, 29 May ===
It is reported that 22 out of 23 radiation monitoring systems around the Fukushima plants were disabled by the earthquake and tsunami. Some were directly damaged, but most were disabled due to communication and power lines being cut. Even monitors equipped with backup satellite links failed, probably due to antenna damage. In Miyagi prefecture, 4 out of 7 were disabled by the tsunami, with the remaining three stopping after three hours. In Ibaraki, some 40 monitors stopped working for three hours until power could be restored.

The first of the typhoons of the season is due to strike the area, while Japan states radiation levels at the seabed are several hundreds of times above normal levels off the coast of Fukushima. "The Science Ministry announced late on Friday highly radioactive materials were detected in a 300-km north-south stretch from Kesennuma in Miyagi Prefecture to Choshi in Chiba Prefecture, the Kyodo news agency reported."

TEPCO reports that cooling has been restored for spent-fuel pools 1 to 4.

=== Tuesday, 31 May ===
An oil spill near reactors 5 and 6 is detected at 8:00 am, as well as an explosion heard at 2:30 pm near reactor 4. TEPCO reports that the explosion was the bursting of an oxygen cylinder damaged by unmanned machinery during debris removal.

TEPCO states that there was a temporary oil leak into the sea near the plant, from an oil pipe that may have been damaged in the March disaster. It is stated as being an extremely small leak, possibly caused by recent rainy weather from Typhoon Songda. TEPCO says that the leak has stopped and oil fences have been installed to prevent the liquid from spreading into the Pacific Ocean.

== June 2011 ==
=== Friday, 3 June ===
The first case is confirmed where radiation levels in humans have exceeded limits since the accident at the plant. One worker in his thirties received 678 mSv, while another one in his forties received 643 mSv. Before the accident the limit for emergency situations was 100 mSv, but it was raised by the government to 250 mSv just after the accident. The two TEPCO workers were on duty in the central control rooms of reactors Nos. 3 and 4 and told the health and labor ministry that they didn't remember whether they wore protective masks or not when a hydrogen explosion occurred at reactor No. 1 on 12 March.

=== Saturday, 4 June ===
Air radiation readings of up to 4000 millisieverts per hour are recorded in the reactor 1 building.

=== Monday, 6 June ===
Japan's Nuclear and Industrial Safety Agency (NISA) gives new estimates of the times at which the reactor pressure vessels were damaged and possibly dropped fuel into the containment vessels: 5 hours after the initial earthquake for reactor 1 (20:00 March 11); 80 hours for reactor 2 (22:50 March 14); and 79 hours for reactor 3 (22:10 March 14). In addition, NISA more than doubles its original estimate of radiation that escaped into the atmosphere in the first six days, from 370,000 terabecquerels to 770,000 terabecquerels.

=== Wednesday, 8 June ===
The ministry of education says that strontium ^{89}Sr and ^{90}Sr have been detected in soil samples collected from late March to early May and 22–62 km away from the Fukushima Daiichi plant. The highest values are reported in Namie town at 1,500 Bq/kg of strontium ^{89}Sr, and 250 Bq/kg of strontium ^{90}Sr.

The Japanese government's report on the Fukushima disaster to IAEA is described in an article in the Yomiuri newspaper. The government report states that nuclear fuel has possibly melted through the base of the pressure vessels in the first three reactors. With data from the government report, the newspaper compares the March timelines provided by TEPCO and by NISA, which had performed further analysis; there were differences in the theoretical timing of events of up to 29 hours in the days following the tsunami.

=== Thursday, 9 June ===
A spokesman for TEPCO says the company is revising its earlier road-map for bringing the plant under control, including the time expected to achieve cold shutdown.

=== Tuesday, 14 June ===
From 00:44 to 02:35 there is a massive steam and smoke release from unit 3, recorded by the TEPCO live cam. No explanation has been given yet by TEPCO officials.

=== Wednesday, 15 June ===
TEPCO begins a trial run of a radioactive water treatment system in an effort to break away from the cycle of injecting water into reactors to cool them and ending up with more contaminated water. While contaminated water is treated, the system is expected to produce about 2,000 cubic meters of radioactive sludge by the end of 2011.

=== Saturday, 18 June ===
The radioactive water treatment system is forced to shut down because a filter exceeds its radioactivity limit. The separation unit, which removes caesium from the water, had been expected to last about a month before its cartridge required replacing—at a radiation level of 4 millisieverts per hour. The radiation levels near the filter cartridge replacement valves reach 4.7 millisieverts per hour after just 5 hours of operation, reportedly due to oil and sludge in the water which contained more radioactivity than expected.

=== Sunday, 19 June ===
Radiation in some areas of Tsukidate, 50 km NW of the Fukushima 1 plant, exceeds the legal limit. The government plans to help households in designated areas to evacuate, raising concern among residents. Although the Tsukidate elementary school has not detected radiation levels in excess of the legal limit, about 80 parents and teachers thoroughly wash windows and verandas with high-pressure water jets and brushes and the school suspends activities on the playground in response to concern by parents.

=== Tuesday, 21 June ===
A radiation reading of 430 millisieverts per hour is recorded in a mezzanine between the first floor and basement of reactor 2. This is the highest level measured up to this point in the reactor 2 building, and marks the first time that workers have entered the basement of this building since the beginning of the crisis.

=== Monday, 27 June ===
Although the radioactive water treatment system has not yet started full-scale operation, a total of 1,850 tons of radioactive water has been processed during test runs of the system. Today this decontaminated water is used to cool the reactors for the first time. TEPCO states that it will continue injecting 16 tons of water per hour for cooling the 3 reactors, and that 13 tons of this will be made up from the decontaminated water. The recycling system operates for only 90 minutes before it is halted due to a burst connection which leaks about one ton of water.

=== Wednesday, 29 June ===
TEPCO reports that tellurium-129m is found at 720 becquerels per litre of seawater collected on 4 June, detected near the water intake for the reactor 1; about 2.4 times safe levels. Though tellurium-129m has a short half-life of about 34 days, TEPCO denied that its detection indicated the possibility of a new leak of radioactive water into the sea.

=== Thursday, 30 June ===
The Itabashi Ward Office announces that a concentration of caesium-134 at 2,700 becquerels per kilogram – in excess of the government's provisional limit – was detected in tea processed from leaves picked on 9 May in Tokyo.

== July 2011 ==
=== Sunday, 3 July ===
The water decontamination and water recycling systems are now both functional. 100% recycled water is now used for reactor cooling, and no additional volume of contaminated water is being generated.

=== Monday, 4 July ===
Radioactive caesium-137 is found in Tokyo's tap water for the first time since April. Radioactive caesium from Fukushima was expected to enter the Japanese seafood supply, and was projected to reach the US West Coast in 5 years.

=== Wednesday, 13 July ===
The Japanese Nuclear Safety Commission publishes a report dated 11 June 1993, (Heisei 5) whose title literally translates to The event of entire alternating current station blackout on the nuclear power plant (原子力発電所における全交流電源喪失事象について) conducted by a working group. This reports the results of an evaluation of the regulations to prevent and handle an occurrence of the full loss of alternating current (Station Blackout or SBO) in nuclear power plants in Japan and other countries. It concludes that further discussion is needed on methods to avoid or recover from such accidents. It also reports that the probability of an SBO in Japan is lower than in other countries.

=== Thursday, 14 July ===
The number of people actively working at the Fukushima Daiichi nuclear plant is about 3,000. NISA orders TEPCO to boost the number of safety managers to support this large number of workers.

The water decontamination systems continue to be plagued by leaks and filter problems. Over the last week they had been operating at an average of 73% capacity, below the target of 90% which is required to meet the current timetable.

=== Saturday, 16 July ===
In a joint assessment the Japanese government and TEPCO say they have completed the first step of a 3-month plan outlined in mid-April for a complete cold shutdown. Reactors 1, 2 and 3 have been cooled to a stable level and nitrogen has been injected into their containment vessels to prevent hydrogen explosions; however, the assessment admits that contaminated water has leaked out of storage tanks, and that water level settings at its water purification facilities were incorrect.

== August 2011 ==
=== Monday, 1 August ===
A radiation level of 10 sieverts per hour is read at a ventilation shaft between reactors 1 and 2. The area is subsequently sealed. The reading of 10 Sv is the maximum for many Geiger counters, including those used for these readings. One official states that it is entirely possible that the radiation readings were higher since the counter was reading its maximum. Radiation has been impeding attempts to replace cooling systems. These are the highest readings logged indoors since the initial March 2011 explosions.

=== Tuesday, 2 August ===
On Tuesday, 2 August, a radiation level of 5 sieverts per hour is detected on the second floor of the turbine building in reactor 1. The radioactivity rates detected on 2 and 1 August are considered lethal for even brief human exposures, an exposure of 0.1 Sv being the normal accepted workplace exposure over 5 years and 8 Sv being a 100% lethal dose.

=== Wednesday, 10 August ===
Installation of the new, closed circulation cooling system is finished for all four damaged reactors (1–4), reactor 1 being the last. Previously, cooling was achieved with water injection by giant pump trucks.

The water decontamination system is not working as well as expected, operating at roughly 66% of expected performance and suffering from numerous malfunctions. The system is necessary to decontaminate the large amount of radioactive water that remains on the site.

== September 2011 ==
=== Thursday, 8 September ===
The Japan Atomic Energy Agency calculates that a total of 15,000 terabecquerels of radiation has been released into the sea from the crippled Fukushima Daiichi power plant.

=== Friday, 16 September ===
Research indicates that the meltdown of reactor 2 could have been avoided if water was injected to cool the reactor 4 hours earlier. Water injection was started at 8 pm on 14 March after the cooling system failed at 1 pm that day. The meltdown could have been avoided if injection had started by 4 pm.

=== Wednesday, 21 September ===
Typhoon Roke brings strong winds and up to 42 cm of rain to some areas of northeast Japan. At the same time a magnitude 5.3 earthquake strikes just south of Fukushima. No significant problems are reported at the Fukushima Daiichi plant.

=== Thursday, 29 September ===
The measured core temperature falls below 100 degrees Celsius for all 3 damaged reactors with reactor number 2 finally achieving this status; reactors 1 and 3 had been below 100 degrees since August.

Hydrogen is found at concentrations of 61 to 63 percent in pipes connected to the reactor 1 containment vessel. Plans are made to check for hydrogen in the pipes of all reactors and flush if necessary to prevent the possibility of another explosion.

== October 2011 ==
=== Saturday, 8 October ===
The Economist reports that high levels of radioactive particles, including plutonium have been found in an extended irregular zone that extends well outside the 30 km evacuation radius around the Fukushima Dai-ichi nuclear power plant.

=== Monday, 31 October ===
A French study by the Institute for Radiological Protection and Nuclear Safety revealed that the Fukushima nuclear disaster caused the biggest discharge of radioactive material into the ocean in history. The radioactive caesium that flowed into the sea from the Fukushima Dai-Ichi nuclear plant was 20 times the amount estimated by its owner, Tokyo Electric Power Co. Atmospheric releases were cited as amounting to 35,800 terabecquerels of caesium-137 by the Atmospheric Chemistry and Physics journal—an estimate about 42 percent of that released into the atmosphere in the Chernobyl explosion in 1986. Caesium-137 has a half-life of 30 years.

== November 2011 ==
=== Tuesday, 1 November ===
TEPCO reports the completion of a cover for the reactor unit 1, which is 54 metres high, 47 metres wide and 42 metres deep. The cover has a built-in ventilation system that is supposed to filter radioactive material.

=== Wednesday, 2 November ===
Boric acid is injected into reactor number 2 after the discovery of xenon in its containment vessel. The presence of xenon may be an indication that a self-sustained fission reaction has been occurring.

=== Friday, 4 November ===
TEPCO retracts Wednesday's statement about a possible self-sustained fission reaction, and now claims that the xenon was a result of the normal decay of radioisotopes in the fuel.

=== Thursday, 17 November ===
The Japanese government bans shipments of rice from a farm near the Fukushima Dai-ichi nuclear plant. 630 becquerels of caesium per kilogram was found in the rice, over the 500 becquerels of caesium per kilogram allowed for human consumption. (From hundreds of spots tested around Fukushima, none had previously exceeded the limit.)

=== Tuesday, 29 November ===
TEPCO now claims that there was no explosion at reactor number 2 on 15 March as previously reported, and that instead the explosion occurred at reactor number 4. However, TEPCO has no explanation for the observed rise in radioactive emissions from reactor 2 at this time.

=== Wednesday, 30 November ===
TEPCO reports that a new computer simulation of the meltdown shows nuclear fuel rod material melting through the pressure vessel and deep inside the concrete of the primary containment vessel, within a foot of breaching it fully in Reactor No. 1. In the pessimistic scenario, all of the fuel of Reactor No. 1 has escaped the pressure vessel, as well as a majority of the fuel for Reactor No. 2 and 3.

== December 2011 ==
=== Saturday, 3 December ===
Forty-five tons of highly radioactive water leaked from the apparatus being used to decontaminate the water at the plant. Plant workers attempted to contain the leak, but it was unknown if any of the water escaped into the water table or the ocean.

=== Thursday, 15 December ===
A long-range timetable is announced for the decommissioning of the Fukushima Daiichi reactors. The plan is to repair the damaged containment vessels and determine the condition of the melted fuel by the end of 2021, then begin the retrieval of this fuel in 2022. The full duration of the schedule is 40 years, with the decommissioning work to be completed by 2052.

=== Friday, 16 December ===
In a joint statement by TEPCO and the Japanese Government it is announced that the reactors have achieved a state of cold shutdown. Temperatures in the containment vessels were 38.9 degrees Celsius for reactor one, 67.5 degrees for reactor two, and 57.4 degrees for reactor 3. This announcement failed to lay to rest substantial concerns arising from TEPCO's inability to directly measure temperatures at the bottoms of the containment vessels, and the fact that the site is too radioactive for visual confirmation of the fuel rods' status.

=== Sunday, 18 December ===
230 tons of highly radioactive water are discovered in a tunnel below a building that stores contaminated water, raising questions about TEPCO's inspection and management capabilities. TEPCO admits that this radioactive water may be mixing with the ground water, yet claims that the tunnel is not connected to the sea.

=== Tuesday, 20 December ===
US Nuclear Regulatory Commission Chairman Gregory Jaczko, visiting Japan, confirmed that the Daiichi reactors were stable. Said Jaczko, "The temperatures have decreased significantly, the amount of heat that's being produced from the reactor fuel itself is very, very low now. So it simply doesn't have the kind of energy, if you will, that's needed to have any kind of off-site releases of radiation. I feel very comfortable with the (government's cold shutdown) decision."

=== Monday, 26 December ===
An interim report was issued by the investigative panel headed by Yotaro Hatamura. In the report, the panel concluded that poor internal communication by the Japanese government and faulty knowledge and actions by TEPCO employees contributed to the disaster. The Japanese cabinet was not informed of the government's System for Prediction of Environmental Emergency Dose Information, which could have told them of the wind direction's effect on the spread of radiation, which would have allowed them to make better decisions on which areas to evacuate around Fukushima Daiichi.

TEPCO workers mistakenly believed that the isolation condenser for reactor No. 1 was still working, when it was not, delaying efforts to try other methods to cool the reactor. TEPCO workers turned off an emergency cooling system on reactor No. 3 for seven hours to try to switch to another system that was not working, allowing the reactor to overheat more quickly.

== 2012 ==
=== 19 January ===
An attempt is made to view the state of the melted fuel in reactor 2 using a fibre-optic endoscope, however clear images of the water level and fuel location could not be obtained, probably due to the harsh environment inside the containment vessel.

After radioactive water was discovered in a tunnel under reactor 2 on 18 December, the government directed TEPCO to survey the plant's underground facilities and check for more accumulation of radioactive water. TEPCO finds an additional 500 tons of water containing 16,200 Bq/cm^{3} of radioactive caesium in a pit near reactor 2, and 600 tons of 860 Bq/cm^{3} water near reactor 3.

=== 22 February ===
TEPCO begins pouring a 60-centimetre-thick layer of concrete over 70,000 square metres of the ocean seabed near the Fukushima Daiichi power plant in an effort to contain contaminated sediments.

=== 27 March ===
TEPCO measures atmospheric radiation at several points inside the containment vessel of reactor 2 for the first time, and reports values of 31.1 and 72.9 Sv/h. The utility states that radiation is too high for robots, endoscopes, and other devices to work properly.

=== 5 April ===
For the second time in 10 days highly radioactive wastewater is accidentally discharged into the sea. About 12 tons of wastewater leaks from a disconnected joint, a large portion of which flows into the sea through a drainage ditch.

=== 5 May ===
Japan's last remaining active nuclear reactor goes offline. Since the Fukushima Daiichi incident, nuclear reactors have not been allowed to restart after being shut down for maintenance or safety checks. One by one the number of active nuclear reactors has steadily decreased until the last of Japan's 54 nuclear reactors is finally taken offline.

=== 22 May ===
Japanese scientists report that the water depth inside the containment of unit 1 is only 40 cm; much lower than expected, and low enough to expose some fuel. From this observation, it is concluded that a 2 cm hole may exist in a pipe that is 40 cm from the bottom of the vessel.

=== 24 May ===
TEPCO releases new estimate of 900,000 terabecquerels for the total amount of radioactive material released from this facility into the environment.

=== 5 July ===
Japan once again has a working nuclear reactor as the number 3 reactor at the Ohi nuclear plant begins generating power. This is the first reactor to be restarted since the tsunami, and marks the end of two months without nuclear power for Japan.

=== 12 October ===
TEPCO admits for the first time that it had failed to take stronger measures to prevent disasters for fear of inviting lawsuits or protests against its nuclear plants. TEPCO's internal reform task force, led by company President Naomi Hirose, said in a report TEPCO had feared efforts to better protect nuclear facilities from severe accidents such as tsunamis would trigger anti-nuclear sentiment, interfere with operations or increase litigation risks. TEPCO could have mitigated the impact of the accident if it had diversified power and cooling systems by paying closer attention to international standards and recommendations, the report said. TEPCO also should have trained employees with practical crisis management skills rather than conduct obligatory drills as a formality, it said. In the internal report TEPCO said that before the accident it had been afraid to consider the risk of such a large tsunami as the one in March 2011 which hit Fukushima, fearing admissions of risk could result in public pressure to shut down plants. "There were concerns that if new countermeasures against severe accidents were installed, concern would spread in host communities that the current plants had safety problems," the report said. TEPCO said in the report that "severe accident measures" were taken in 2002, which included "containment venting and power supply cross-ties between units," but additional measures were never put in place. TEPCO added that taking such measures could also add to "public anxiety and add momentum to anti-nuclear movements."

== 2013 ==
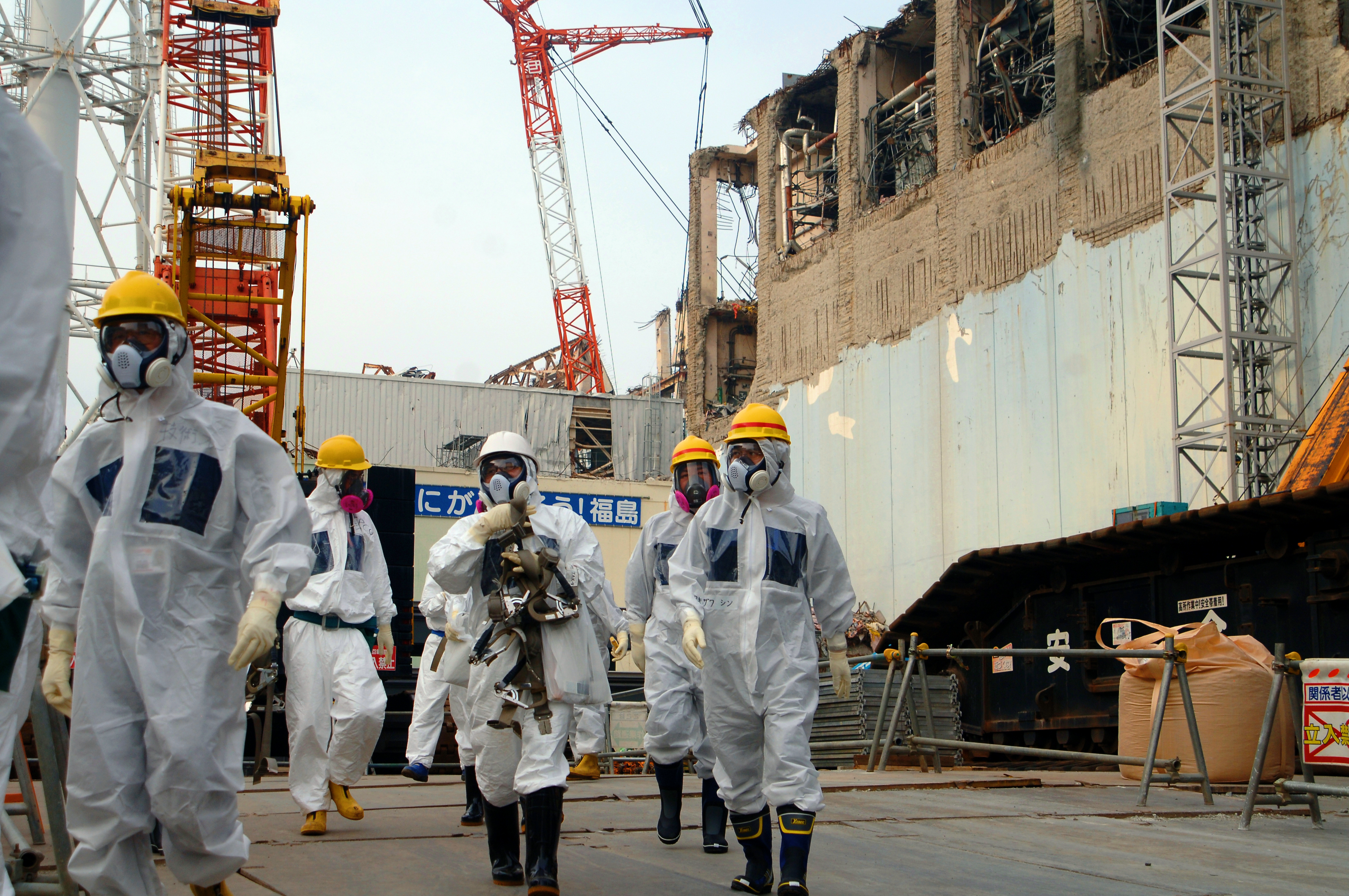
IAEA Experts at Fukushima Daiichi Nuclear Power Plant Unit 4, 2013

=== 18 March ===
Public trust in TEPCO further declines as cooling systems for several spent-fuel pools go down for more than 29 hours after a power interruption that may have been caused by a rat in a switchboard.

=== 9 July ===
Levels of caesium in groundwater from monitoring wells around the reactors jumps by 90 times compared with the levels 3 days earlier. The contamination is now measured at 9,000 becquerels of caesium-134 and 18,000 becquerels of caesium-137 per litre of water. As well, tritium levels in seawater from the port next to the plant have been increasing since May, and a water sample taken on 3 July showed 2,300 becquerels per litre, the highest measurement since the start of the nuclear crisis in March 2011.

=== 10 July ===
Japanese government admits Fukushima Daiichi may have been leaking radioactive water into ground water and into the ocean since 2011.

=== 22 July ===
TEPCO admits that since the 2011 reactor breaches, radioactive water has continued to leak from the plant into groundwater, making the groundwater radioactive, with implications for drinking water and for the Pacific.

=== 19 August ===
It is discovered that 300 tonnes of highly contaminated water (80 MBq/L) had leaked from a storage tank and seeped into the ground.

=== 21 August ===
Japan's Nuclear Regulation Authority raises the severity of the contaminated water leaks at Fukushima to INES level 3 "serious incident".

=== 26 August ===
The Japanese government takes charge in dealing with the contaminated water situation. Trade minister Toshimitsu Motegi says "We've allowed Tokyo Electric to deal with the contaminated water situation on its own and they've essentially turned it into a game of Whack-a-Mole".

=== 15 September ===
Japan is once again nuclear free as its only working reactor goes offline for refuelling and maintenance.

=== 18 November ===
Workers begin removing fuel rods from a storage pond at the Unit 4 reactor building. About 1,500 rods, some of them damaged, must be removed in a risky and dangerous operation set to take a year. Removed rods will then be moved into a more secure storage.

== 2014 ==
=== 6 February ===
The reanalysis of a groundwater sample taken from a well in July 2013 updates its measurement from 900,000 Bq/L total beta radioactivity to a record-high 5 MBq/L of strontium-90 only (corresponding to about 10 MBq/L total beta radioactivity), after a problem with the measuring devices was found in October.

=== 13 February ===
It is revealed that TEPCO had concealed for months the increase in measured groundwater radioactivity.

=== 21 May ===
TEPCO begins operation to bypass groundwater flow around the reactor by pumping upstream groundwater to storage tanks, then discharging directly to the sea after measuring the contamination levels.

=== 3 June ===
TEPCO begins to construct facilities to establish an ice wall within the ground around the reactors to prevent contaminated water from mixing with groundwater flowing under the area.

=== 7 July ===
TEPCO has switched off the cooling system at reactor 5 due to a 3mm leak near a flow valve. Approximately 1,300-litre of water has spilled. They have approximately 9 days to repair it before water temperature reaches 65 degrees Celsius

=== 17 July ===
TEPCO launches another campaign to contain the spread of contaminated sediments in the sea near the power plant, this time coating 180,000 square meters of sea floor with cement.

=== 20 December ===
TEPCO reports that all spent fuel rods have now been safely removed from the storage pool at reactor 4.

== 2015 ==
=== 10 January ===
TEPCO begins operation of a new reverse-osmosis system to remove strontium from contaminated water. The new system was built to treat 500 to 900 cubic metres of water per day, and reduce the strontium levels in the water by a factor of 100 to 1000.

=== 10 April ===
A robot designed to withstand intense heat and radiation is sent into Reactor 1 to locate the melted fuel. It covers 14 of 18 locations before it stops functioning and has to be abandoned.

=== 5 September ===
The evacuation order is lifted for Naraha Town in Fukushima Prefecture.

=== 10 September ===
The Sendai-1 nuclear reactor resumes commercial operation for the first time since the earthquake in May 2011. This ends almost 2 years with no Japan nuclear power plants in commercial operation since Ohi-1 was halted on 15 September 2013.

=== 26 October ===
After a 3 1/2-year construction project, TEPCO completes a 780 m seaside shielding wall to reduce the amount of contaminated water leaking into the sea.

== 2016 ==
=== 16 February ===
TEPCO estimates that 749,000 cubic metres of contaminated debris from Fukushima Daiichi will be produced by the year 2027, and releases a plan for incineration and storage of this waste.

== 2017 ==
=== 3 February ===
TEPCO said the radiation level in the containment vessel of reactor 2 at the crippled Fukushima No. 1 power plant was 530 sieverts per hour, the highest recorded level since the triple core meltdown in March 2011. This is however the first measurement of the radiation level within the reactor area and as such is likely lower than in the initial period after the meltdown. TEPCO also announced that there is a 2-meter hole in a metal grating under the pressure vessel in the reactor's primary containment vessel.

=== 20 June ===
A recent investigation by TEPCO using temperature measurements has determined the probable location of the cores for reactors 1–3. They believe that most of the core debris has breached the pressure vessel and lies at the bottom of the containment vessel for reactors 1 and 3, although some debris seems to be lodged in the control rod drive mechanism for reactor 1. However, they believe that most debris may remain at the bottom of the pressure vessel for reactor 2.

=== 19–21 July ===
A remote operated robot takes the first pictures of the melted core of reactor 3. Some melted material hangs from the control-rod insertion mechanism under the pressure vessel, and there are piles of rocky objects at the bottom of the primary containment vessel that are thought to be melted core.

=== 26 September ===
A revised decommissioning roadmap has the removal of fuel rods from reactor 3 storage pool starting in 2018, but the removal of fuel rods from the reactor 1 and 2 storage pools will be delayed until 2023. Removal of melted fuel debris from one of the reactors is expected to begin by 2021.

== 2018 ==
=== 19 January ===
Unit 2 containment is investigated with a camera. The containment floor below the reactor is found to be covered with sandy and clay-like deposits that are thought to be fuel debris. Some fuel assembly components are seen on the floor. No significant damage is seen on the inner wall. The radiation dose rate in the containment varies between 7 and 42 grays per hour, depending on the location.

== 2019 ==
=== 15 February ===
A robot with two "fingers" makes first contact with the fuel debris in the primary containment vessel (PCV) of reactor 2. The robot was able to move loose debris at 7 of the 10 locations probed, providing hope that it may be possible to remove these deposits from the PCV.

== 2021 ==
=== 28 February ===
Removing all 566 spent fuel assemblies from the storage pool of unit 3 is completed.

=== 13 April ===
The Cabinet of Prime Minister Suga unanimously approves that TEPCO release stored, treated wastewater to the Pacific Ocean over a course of 30 years.

== 2023 ==
=== 24 August ===
Discharge of treated wastewater into the Pacific Ocean begins.

== See also ==
- 2011 Japanese nuclear accidents
- Fukushima Daiichi nuclear disaster
- Radiation effects from Fukushima Daiichi nuclear disaster
- Fukushima 50
- 2011 Tōhoku earthquake and tsunami
- List of civilian nuclear incidents (2010s)
- Lists of nuclear disasters and radioactive incidents
- Nuclear safety
