= Fukushima 50 =

Media term for staff of Fukushima Plant

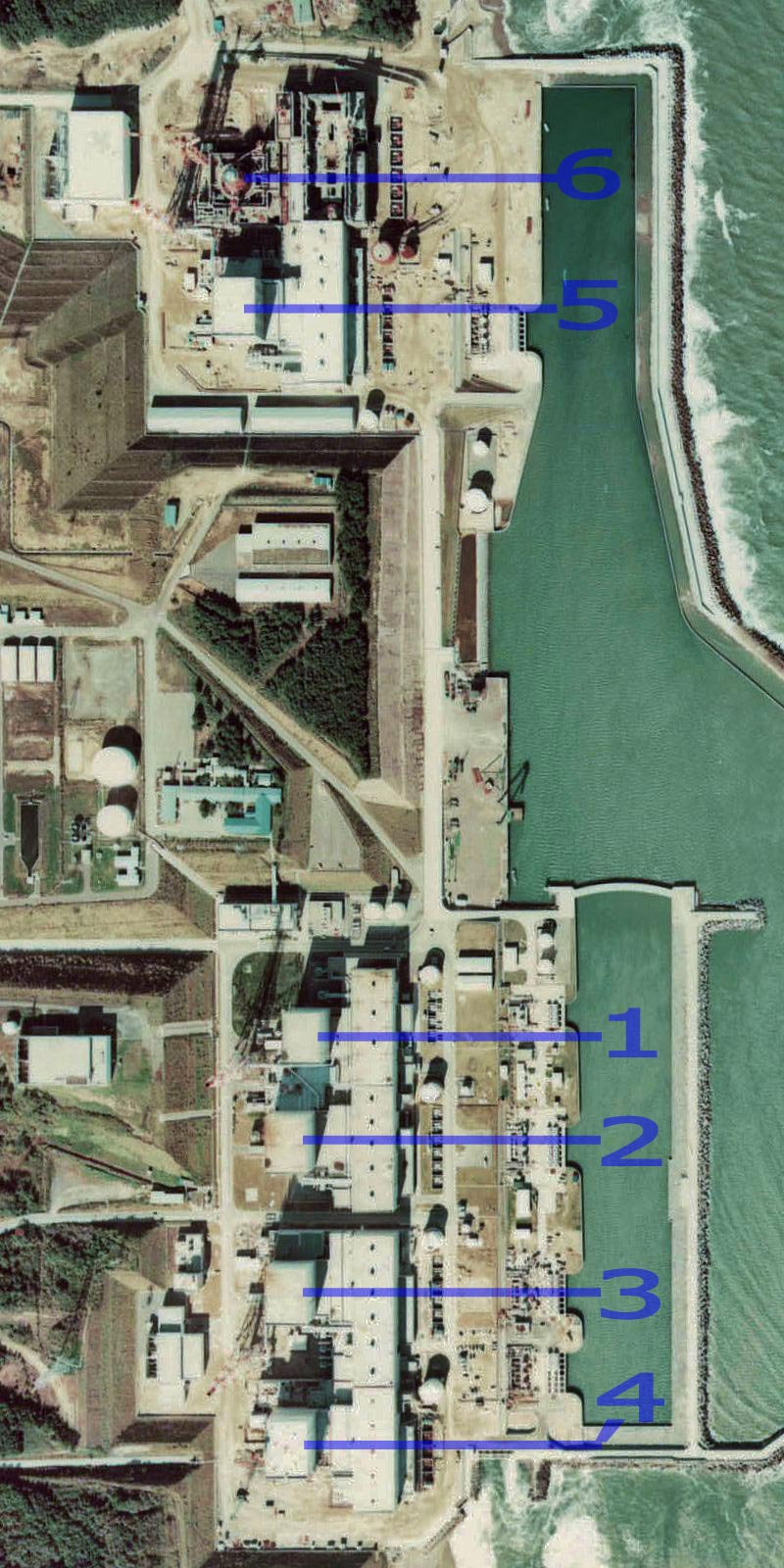
Satellite image of the Fukushima Daiichi Nuclear Power Plant where the "Fukushima 50" were assigned to stabilize the six reactors at the plant

Fukushima 50 is a pseudonym given by English-language media to a group of employees at the Fukushima Daiichi Nuclear Power Plant. Following the Tōhoku earthquake and tsunami on 11 March 2011, a related series of nuclear accidents resulted in melting of the cores of three reactors. These 50 employees remained on-site after 750 other workers were evacuated.

After TEPCO management proposed withdrawing all its employees from the plant on 14 March, additional manpower was deployed from around Japan. Some workers traveled on clear roads by convoy from Tokyo. When they arrived, hundreds of firemen, SDF personnel and employees of TEPCO, convened 20 km (12 mi) from the plant and debated how to best stabilize the plant. On the night of 15 March, these workers joined the original Fukushima 50. Despite the inaccurate count, the Fukushima 50 has remained the pseudonym used by media to refer to the group of workers at Fukushima reflecting the solitary nature of the role.

The number of the workers involved rose to 580 on the morning of 18 March as staff from the Kashiwazaki-Kariwa Nuclear Power Plant and workers installing the new power line joined in. More than 1,000 workers, firefighters, and soldiers toiled at the site on 23 March. The Fukushima 50 were drawn from Toshiba, Hitachi, Kajima, firefighters from Tokyo, Osaka, Yokohama, Kawasaki, Nagoya and Kyoto, TEPCO and its subsidiaries such as Kandenko, TEP Industry and TEP Environmental Engineering, and many small-to-mid-size companies that have contracts with these big companies.

Over 20 workers had been injured by 18 March, including one who was exposed to a large amount of ionizing radiation when the worker tried to vent vapour from a valve of the containment building. Three more workers were exposed to radiation over 100 mSv, and two of them were sent to a hospital due to beta burns on 24 March. Two other workers, Kazuhiko Kokubo, 24, and Yoshiki Terashima, 21, were killed by the tsunami while conducting emergency repairs immediately after the quake. Their bodies were found on 30 March.

The workers and volunteers were assigned the mission of stabilizing the reactors. Their activities included assessing the damage and radiation levels caused by the explosions, cooling stricken reactors with seawater, and preventing any risk of fire. These workers remained on-site despite serious risks of radiation poisoning. Levels of radiation on site are far higher than in the 20 km (12 mi) exclusion zone and media outlets reported that the severity of the situation could have grave implications on their future health, with possibly fatal consequences for the workers. On 18 March, according to Prime Minister Naoto Kan the workers were "prepared for death".

On 14 March, a complete withdrawal proposed by TEPCO was rejected by the prime minister, who instead opted to continue attempts at bringing the reactors under control during the Fukushima Daiichi nuclear disaster.

== Conditions ==
=== Working environment ===
The workers ate and slept in shifts in a two-storey earthquake-resistant building at the center of the complex constructed in July 2010, about "the size of an average living room."

A daily schedule at Fukushima I nuclear plant, according to the article on 28 March.

| Time | Event |
|---|---|
| 6 am | Wake up |
| 7–8 am | Meeting at the antiseismic building (免震重要棟, menshin-jūyō-tō) |
| 8–10 am | Breakfast (biscuits about 30 pieces and one bottle of vegetable juice) |
| About 10 am | Commence tasks at the reactor building and boiler building |
| About 5 pm | Finish work |
| 5–8 pm | Supper (retort-packed rice and one canned food) |
| 8–10 pm | Meeting at the antiseismic building |
| About 10 pm | Sleep, with blanket on the floor, except people who work at night. |

During some work, in high radiation areas, the workers were limited to 15-minute sessions inside the damaged buildings.

=== Radiation ===
The international limit for radiation exposure for nuclear workers is 20 millisievert (20 mSv, or 2 rem) per year, averaged over five years, with a limit of 50 mSv in any one year. However, for workers performing emergency services, the United States Environmental Protection Agency (EPA) guidance on dose limits is 100 mSv when "protecting valuable property" and 250 mSv when the activity is "life saving or protection of large populations."

Prior to the accident, the maximum permissible dose for Japanese nuclear workers was 100 mSv in any one year, but on 15 March 2011, the Japanese Health and Labor Ministry enforced the permitted 250 mSv limit, in light of the situation at the Fukushima Nuclear Power Plant. However, the workers at Fukushima plant declined the elevated 250 mSv limit and kept adopting the previous 100 mSv. Tokyo Enesys, a subsidiary of TEPCO, adopted a limit of 80 mSv to manage the radiation level monitoring with some buffer. Kandenko, Kajima and Taisei Corporation adopted 100 mSv. Hitachi changed their internal limit to 200 mSv. TEPCO decided to move workers around 200mSv to a low-radiated site while its subsidiaries, Tokyo Enesys and Kandenko, adopted limits around 100mSv. Over 30 workers were exposed to radiation beyond 100 mSv by 23 April 2011.

The Fukushima workers had to be wary of radiation spiking—a sudden and unforeseen rise in radiation. This threat forced the workers to evacuate for a short period of time on the morning of Tuesday 15 March 2011 when radiation detected at Fukushima rose to approximately 1000 mSv/h, the highest level of radiation detected at any point of time during the accident at the plant.

The workers wore hazmat suits and hazmat masks, carrying dosimeters that alerted at 80 millisieverts. Each worker had to stop the operation once the dosimeter alerted. According to TEPCO, seven TEPCO workers were exposed to radiation over the limit of 100 millisievert by the morning of 20 March.

In context, immediate symptoms become apparent if exposed to above 250 mSv per day. Symptoms include nausea and loss of appetite as well as damage to bone marrow, lymph nodes and the spleen. Generally, these symptoms become more severe and noticeable in the 1000 to 3000 mSv bracket with recovery probable, but not assured. New and more serious symptoms appear above 3000 mSv such as peeling of the skin, hemorrhaging and sterility with death if left untreated.

== Explosions ==
The Fukushima 50 were present when hydrogen explosions occurred at the reactor buildings of units 1, 3, and 4. Five workers were injured in the unit 1 explosion at 15:36 on 12 March. Most of the injuries were not severe. Eleven workers were injured in the unit 3 explosion at 11:01 on 14 March. The explosion at unit 4 at about 6 am on 15 March did not cause injuries. The explosions scattered radioactive concrete debris around the buildings, which made the working conditions on the site more difficult.

== Number of workers ==
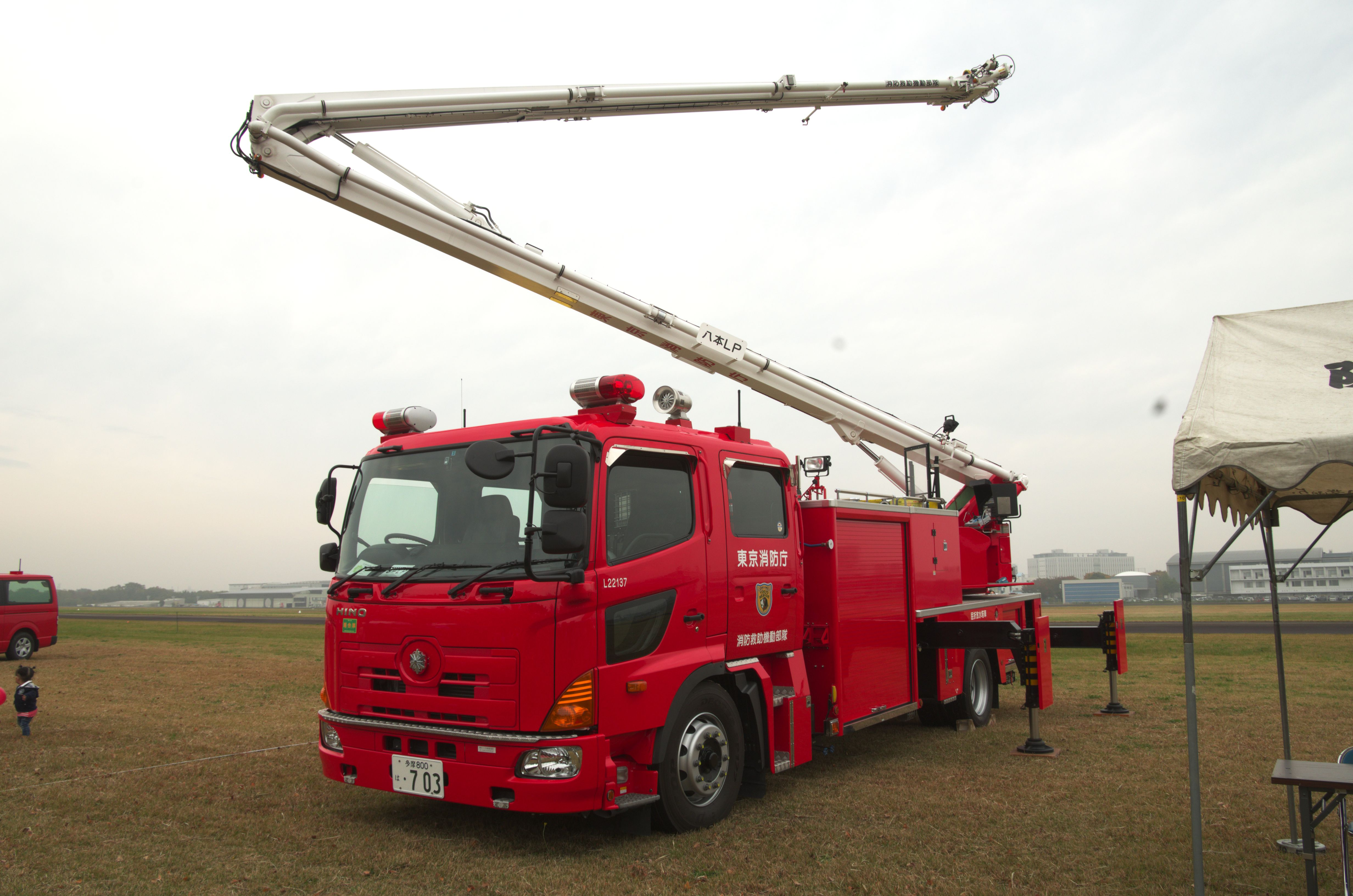
Water tower vehicles from major fire departments were integral to the emergency cooling operations

Originally, there were approximately 800 workers on 11 March 2011, the day the earthquake and tsunami struck. On 15 March, workers deemed non-essential were withdrawn by the Tokyo Electric Power Company. A total of around 750 workers left due to increased risk and consequently left around 50. It was on this day that the media started to call the remaining workers the "Fukushima 50".

However, on the morning of 16 March, the remaining workers had to be evacuated for a brief period of time due to a radiation spike which was detected which could be harmful to the workers' health. It was reported that when they returned to the plant, a further 130 or so workers joined their colleagues to total of around 180 to stabilize the reactors. The number of workers rose to 580 on the morning of 18 March. By 12 April, approximately 700 workers were working on-site.

By 21 March 2011, Toshiba had sent a 100-strong team to two Fukushima plants as part of a task-force of 700 Toshiba workers organized at Toshiba's Isogo Engineering Centre to defuse the nuclear crisis, and Hitachi had dispatched 120 to Fukushima I and formed a 1000-strong task force.

Referring to the original 50 workers, nuclear researcher Dr. Eric Hall opined that they were likely to be older, and unlikely to have further children, so the long-term effects of exposure to high-levels of ionizing radiation would be less likely to appear before a natural death. Some younger workers were injured and young Osaka firefighters were operating at the site. A group of 250 skilled senior citizens volunteered to work in the radioactive environment, citing reduced harm to them.

Team leader Masao Yoshida died of esophageal cancer in 2013, but the cancer was likely to be unrelated to the event at Fukushima, as development typically takes 5–10 years.

| Organization | Workers on site | Date of the # | Tasks | Source | |
|---|---|---|---|---|---|
| Toshiba | 100 | | Recovering Electricity, Installing pumps for sea water | | "Chosen team with full of skills and sense of responsibilities"(Toshiba PR staff), forming supporting team of 700 nuclear technicians at Isogo Engineering Centre and 150 supporting team at the main office. |
| Hitachi | 120 | 24 March | | | Electric technicians |
| IHI | 30 | 24 March | supporting spraying at Unit 2 | | |
| Kajima and its subsidiaries | 130 to 150 | 8 April | | | |
| Taisei Corporation | 130 to 150 | 8 April | | | |
| Tokyo Metropolitan Police Department | 10 | 17 March | spraying at Unit 3 | | using riot police water cannon |
| Tokyo FD | 139 | 19 March | spraying water | | On 19 March 2011, 139 responders worked, including 119 of the Tokyo "Hyper Rescues" Squad |
| Osaka FD | 53* | 19–22 March | spraying water, decontamination for firefighters | | supporting Tokyo FD |
| Yokohama FD | 67* | 22–24 March | spraying water | | succeeded Osaka FD |
| Kawasaki FD | 36* | 24–26 March | spraying water | | succeeded Yokohama FD, spraying at #3 |
| Nagoya FD | 34* | 26–28 March | spraying water | | succeeded Kawasaki FD, a firefighter aged 39:"My wife cried when she heard I would be dispatched. I could reject the dispatch, but I thought it wasn't right that a younger [firefiighter] would be dispatched instead of me, so I decided to go. I will be back to fulfill the duty without accident." |
| Kyoto FD | 40* | 29–30 March | spraying water | | chosen members who have knowledge of nuclear or biochemical disaster |
| Kobe FD | 53 | 31 March to 1 April | spraying water | | Members who knew how to deal with radiation or biochemical weapons |
| Japan Self-Defense Forces | | | spraying water, filming from helicopters | | Used two helicopters to pour water while equipment was still inadequate. |
| U.S. Marine Corps | 140 | | | | Chemical Biological Incident Response Force |
| TEPCO | 330 | 23 March | | | |
| Kandenko and subsidiaries | 200 | 24 March | | | Subsidiary of TEPCO |
| TEP Industry | never mentioned | | | | Subsidiary of TEPCO |
| TEP Environment Engineering | never mentioned | | | | Subsidiary of TEPCO |
| Tokyo Enesys | never mentioned | | | | Subsidiary of TEPCO |
| "Cooporative Companies" of TEPCO | 224 | 23 March | | | Some companies, typically big companies, use the word cooperative companies, which they have contract with. Cooperative companies are third-party and mostly mid-to-small companies as Tokai Paintings which have dispatched 6 volunteers out of 80 employees (May 2009), while TEPCO employs 52,628 (end of 2009) including their subsidiaries. Some co-operative "company men" were only paid around 20,000 yen (US$236), and volunteered for the position for fear of losing their jobs. While others volunteered because they felt they were "the only workers that [could] do the job" and a shared a sense of solidarity. |
| Hazama Corporation | 7* | 15 to 18 March | clear and repair roads at the scene | | |

*: task finished

== Injury ==
Over 20 workers were injured by 18 March. Three workers were exposed to radiation and two were rushed to a hospital with up to 180 mSv, which is less than the maximum 250 mSv that the government allowed for workers at the plant. Both workers, one in his twenties and one in his thirties, were from Kandenko and were regular workers at Fukushima II nuclear power plant. Another worker was from a contract company of Kandenko.

== Cooperation ==
| Organization | | Source | |
|---|---|---|---|
| U.S. Navy | preparing 2 ships with 1,100 tons of water each | | The U.S. government strongly recommended the Japanese government use fresh water because of accidents salt water could cause. The U.S. Navy supplied backup fresh water. |

== Reaction of media and public ==
Media outlets lauded the remaining workers' bravery, and called them "heroes", and as a result they have become known in the media as the "Fukushima 50". France 24 called them "Japan's faceless heroes", British newspaper, The Guardian wrote: "Other nuclear power employees, as well as the wider population, can only look on in admiration". They have been compared to the Forty-seven Ronin. In Hong Kong, a group of netizens at HKGolden Forum dedicated Cantonese and Japanese lyrics based on a Cantopop song, entitled "福島烈士─向福島50人致敬" (Martyr of Fukushima - Tribute to the Fukushima Fifty), to the workers.

According to Robert Hetkämper, a correspondent for the German television network ARD, the label "Fukushima 50" was invented by a foreign newspaper, and then was imported by the Japanese media. The "Fukushima 50" would include engineers as well as unskilled workers, and there would be grounds to suspect that many workers were not really aware of the dangers of their assignment.

== Awards ==
On 7 September 2011, the "Fukushima Heroes" were honored with the Prince of Asturias Award for Peace, an award given by the Crown Prince of Spain.

== See also ==
- Hymn to The Fukushima 50
- Liquidator (Chernobyl) - name given to workers who were employed to contain the damage resulting from the Chernobyl disaster
- Lists of nuclear disasters and radioactive incidents
- Masao Yoshida (nuclear engineer)
- Nuclear labor issues
- Radiation effects from Fukushima Daiichi nuclear disaster
- Timeline of the Fukushima I nuclear accidents#Tuesday, 15 March
