= Masao Yoshida (nuclear engineer) =

Japanese nuclear power plant manager (1955–2013)

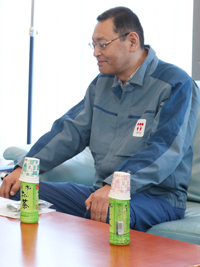
- 2011
- Born: February 17, 1955; Osaka, Japan
- Died: July 9, 2013 (aged 58); Shinjuku, Tokyo, Japan

Masao Yoshida (吉田 昌郎, Yoshida Masao; 17 February 1955 – 9 July 2013) was a nuclear engineer who served as plant manager of the Tokyo Electric Power Company Fukushima Daiichi Nuclear Power Plant during the Fukushima nuclear disaster.

== Early life and career ==
Yoshida was born in Osaka, Japan in 1955 and graduated from the Tokyo Institute of Technology in 1979 with a master's degree in nuclear engineering. He turned down a job offer from the Ministry of International Trade and Industry to join Tokyo Electric Power Company, where he spent most of his career in on-site roles at nuclear power plants.

In April 2007, TEPCO created a Nuclear Asset Management Department. Yoshida served as general manager of the department from its inception until June 2010. In 2008, the department reviewed data regarding potential risks of tsunami of up to 15.7 m at the plant, and declined to take action to strengthen the plant's defenses due to the risk of a large tsunami being unrealistic. However, this view was shared at the time by the Japanese government as well as the Japan Society of Civil Engineers.

In 2009, Yoshida and several other senior TEPCO executives accepted temporary pay cuts to take responsibility for TEPCO's response to the 2007 Niigata earthquake.

== Fukushima disaster ==
Yoshida was appointed to manage the Fukushima Daiichi Nuclear Power Plant in June 2010, his fourth stint at Fukushima, just months prior to the Tohoku earthquake and tsunami on 11 March 2011. After the earthquake struck the plant at 2:46 pm that afternoon, followed by the tsunami at 3:37 pm, Yoshida made the official declaration of nuclear emergency at 4:30 pm. During the early stages of the crisis, the lack of contingency plans and leadership from headquarters gave Yoshida almost complete control and responsibility over the disaster response.

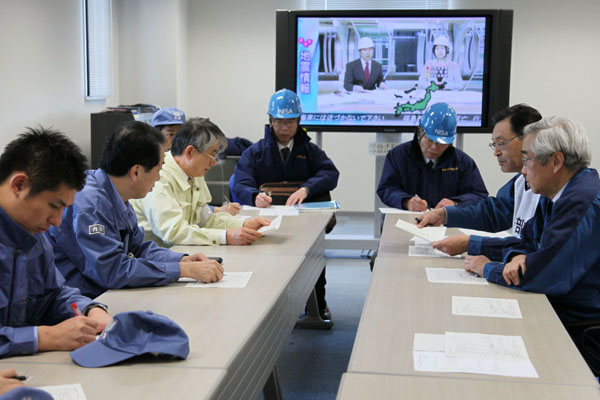
Yoshida (right, in white vest) meets with Prime Minister Kan (center left) on 12 March 2011, the morning after a tsunami struck the Fukushima plant.

Shortly before midnight on 11 March, the day of the tsunami, Yoshida decided to vent the plant's Daiichi Unit 1 as a core meltdown was causing the reactor to exceed its maximum internal pressure. Prime Minister Naoto Kan travelled to Fukushima early the next morning to meet with Yoshida and other TEPCO officials and discuss TEPCO's venting plans. Yoshida left the plant's command center for about 20 minutes to meet Kan in person. Kan later recounted:

Yoshida said that this was what we wanted to do, and this was how we were doing it. So, in a very short time he was able to tell me, nicely and clearly what they were doing and why. That was fine with me. If he had gone into details, I wouldn’t have understood it anyway. He managed to convince me that he knew what was going on.

On the other hand, Yoshida described Kan as "running amok, yelling and acting in an extremely high-handed manner."

Venting work began at 9 am the next morning, shortly after Prime Minister Kan's meeting with Yoshida, but was not completed until 2 pm. The unit suffered a hydrogen explosion less than two hours later which blew off its roof and upper walls.

Due to power loss, TEPCO lost the ability to control pressure in the Daiichi Unit 1 containment on the morning of 12 March. The reactor suffered an explosion on the afternoon of 12 March that destroyed its concrete containment building. At around 6 pm on 12 March, METI Minister Banri Kaieda issued a verbal order to inject seawater into Unit 1. Prime Minister Kan, unaware that pumping had already begun at 7:04 pm, expressed concern that seawater injection would lead to re-criticality, and TEPCO in response ordered Yoshida to stop pumping at 7:25 pm based on the prime minister's "mood." Kan then received a report that injecting seawater would not lead to re-criticality, and directed pumping to resume at 7:55 pm. Yoshida had meanwhile quietly ordered plant personnel to continue pumping, while making it appear to TEPCO that he had told the personnel to stop.

In May 2011, the Yomiuri Shimbun reported that Kan had ordered seawater injection to stop, based on allegations in an email newsletter circulated by former (and future) prime minister Shinzo Abe. Opposition leader Sadakazu Tanigaki publicly accused Kan's government of causing the meltdowns by delaying the injection of seawater. However, Yoshida publicly acknowledged about a week later that the seawater injections never actually stopped, and it then became clear that a TEPCO manager was the actual source of the order to stop pumping. TEPCO reprimanded Yoshida and said it would penalize him, but Kan defended Yoshida's actions. Yoshida is today most remembered for his decision to continue pumping despite the orders from TEPCO management to stop.

On 15 March, amid speculation that TEPCO might completely abandon Fukushima and an evacuation of the entire Kanto region may have become necessary, Yoshida decided to evacuate most of the 650 staff at Fukushima Daiichi to the nearby Daini plant. He thereafter directed the on-site disaster response at Daiichi as the leader of the team known as the Fukushima 50. Yoshida later recounted that at the time of this decision, he had to consider which of his colleagues he would ask to stay behind with him and potentially die in a worst-case scenario. However, around 18 March, after successful cooling and de-pressurization efforts, as well as the expedited delivery of additional fire trucks and an 80-ton Putzmeister concrete pouring pump truck to the plant, the situation at Fukushima Daiichi stabilized.

After the disaster, Yoshida was interviewed by the government's nuclear accident investigation committee for more than 28 hours over 13 sessions, creating an exhaustive record known as the Yoshida Testimony, one of the most valuable historic accounts of the disaster.

== Illness and death ==
Eight months into the Fukushima disaster response, Yoshida was hospitalized on 24 November 2011 after esophageal cancer was discovered during a routine medical checkup. He was relieved from duty as Fukushima plant manager and transferred to a head office executive position on 1 December 2011. TEPCO alleged that Yoshida's illness was unlikely to be connected to his work at Fukushima, since his cumulative radiation exposure at the plant was only around 70 millisieverts, and cancer following radiation exposure at such a level would normally take around five years to develop. Yoshida was thereafter hospitalized several more times, and underwent emergency surgery following a stroke in July 2012.

Yoshida died on 9 July 2013. He was 58 and is survived by his wife, Yoko, and three sons. "If Yoshida wasn’t there, the disaster could have been much worse”, said Reiko Hachisuka, head of a business group in Okuma town. Former Prime Minister Naoto Kan tweeted a tribute, “I bow in respect for his leadership and decision-making."

== In media ==
Yoshida was portrayed by Ken Watanabe in the 2020 film Fukushima 50, and by Koji Yakusho in the 2023 Netflix series The Days.
