= Defence in depth (disambiguation) =

Defence in depth, a military strategy that seeks to delay rather than prevent the advance of an attacker.

Defence in depth may refer to:

- Defence-in-depth (Roman military), a military tactic of the Roman Empire
- Defence in depth (non-military)
- Defense in depth (computing)
- Defense in depth (nuclear engineering)
