= Military geography =

Field of geography

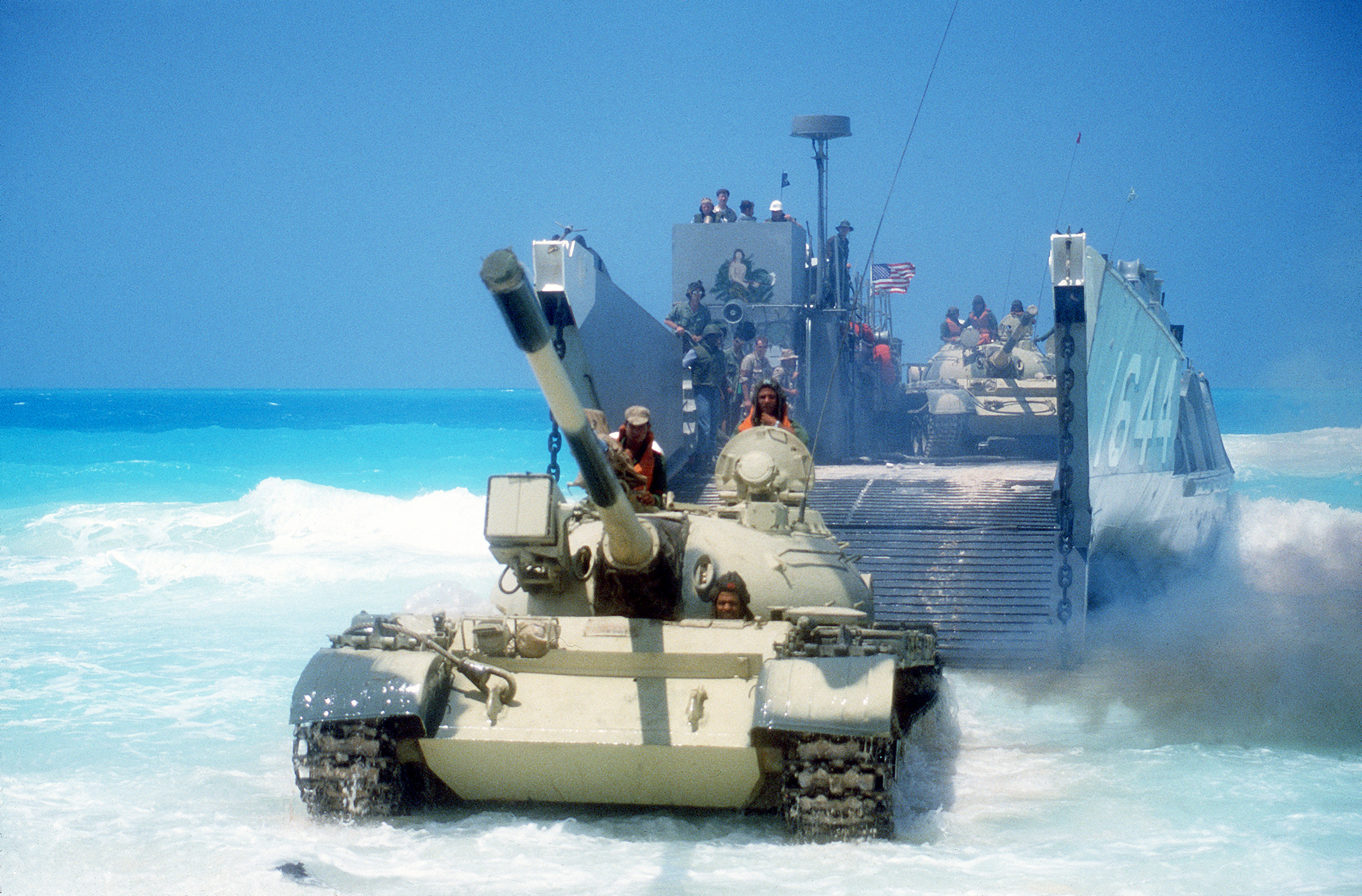
A landing in Egypt.

Military geography is a sub-field of geography that is used by the military, as well as academics and politicians, to understand the geopolitical sphere through the military lens. To accomplish these ends, military geographers consider topics from geopolitics to physical locations’ influences on military operations and the cultural and economic impacts of a military presence. On a tactical level, a military geographer might put together the terrain and the drainage system below the surface, so a unit is not at a disadvantage if the enemy uses the drainage system to ambush it, especially in urban warfare. On a strategic level, an emerging field of strategic and military geography seeks to understand the changing human and biophysical environments that alter the security and military domains. Climate change, for example, is adding and multiplying the complexity of military strategy, planning and training. Emerging responsibilities for the military to be involved in: protection of civilian populations (Responsibility to protect), women and ethnic groups; provision of humanitarian aid and disaster response (HADR); new technology and domains of training and operations, such as in cybergeography, make military geography a dynamic frontier.

If a general desired to be a successful actor in the great drama of war, his first duty is to study carefully the theater of operations so that he may see clearly the relative advantages and disadvantages it presents for himself and his enemies.

— Baron De Jomini

== History and Development of Military Geography ==
Military geography has a long and practical history. For example, Imperial Military Geography in 1938 shows how a colonial empire approach to military geography could describe the geographical setting of empire, the responsibilities and the resources that could be mobilised for national or imperial needs. Environmental determinism, regional geography, geographic information systems and geography more generally have all evolved and entwined over hundreds of years.

The revival of geography and military geography as a sub-discipline is a remarkable trend since 2000 with a number of key geopolitical, international relations, historical geography and geographical approaches being developed. The American Association of Geographers and Institute of Australian Geographers have interest groups that continue to develop the sub-discipline of military geography.

In 2018, Australian Contributions to Strategic and Military Geography outlined a new Australian approach and included chapters on themes and specific regions.

== Urbanistics ==
Russian colonel N. S. Olesik terms the field of analyzing the complex urban environment in particular “military geo-urbanistics.” In the open country, units only deal with terrain, weather, and the enemy. In urban warfare, the terrain is more complex, filled with many structures and transformations of the land by the inhabitants, which restrict visibility from the air and create obstacles to ground units. Spaces may be narrow, and convoys may be restricted to certain routes between buildings, where they face roadside bombs and ambushes. Units must work with or work around local people, some of whom may cooperate and others of whom may oppose, while others are neutral or caught between the two factions. Guerilla fighters may count on an enemy's unwillingness to bomb or fire on heavily populated areas.

== Types of terrain ==
Several types of terrain and associated climate are prevalent, each affecting combatants differently.

=== Desert warfare ===
In an arid climate, as in many desert areas across the globe, sand is a main concern. Sand can hamper an army's attempts to remain hydrated, sapping moisture from skin; sand also jams machinery including the firing mechanisms of firearms.

Terrain is usually fairly flat, though in some regions there are vast, rolling sand dunes. The desert environment can also contain mountains; as in Afghanistan and in certain areas around Israel. Due to the ongoing conflicts in the Middle East, the U.S. military has redesigned the uniforms for the different branches of service. All of the uniforms have a digital camouflage pattern that is very effective in the desert environment, and the boots have been changed from the standard polished black boots to light brown colored suede leather boots. These boots are cooler under the intense heat of the desert sun.

=== Jungle and forest warfare ===
The conditions of these regions are basically the opposite of those found in desert regions. There are thousands of flora and fauna, and there is always moisture present which presents its own difficulties. The moisture speeds up the rotting processes as well as causing wounds to become infected much easier because of all of the bacteria that live in the water. With proper filtration systems an army should have no problem keeping hydrated.

The densely packed trees and underbrush provide concealment from the air as well as from the ground. Ambushes can be easily conducted in this environment just like they can in an urban environment. The jungle can also contain mountains, but these mountains are organized differently from those that exist in the desert. The jungle mountains have far more plant life, and are usually much more difficult to ascend. Helicopters have been proven as a very useful means of transportation over jungle and forested areas; Vietnam was, of course, the testing ground for this. Tanks and other vehicles have difficulty maneuvering through and around the densely packed trees, and most military aircraft fly too fast to accurately observe the ground through the trees.

=== Winter warfare ===
This type of warfare is not based on a geographical design, but is based on the drastic differences in this particular climate. During war it is much harder to remain warm than it is to remain cool. Even Forested areas can, and many do, experience winter weather conditions. For this specific type of combat there are soldiers that are specifically trained to fight under the conditions individual to the winter season. These conditions call for a drastically thicker and thus warmer uniform, and the weapons even need to be refitted with the proper devices to ensure that they will operate in the cold.

=== Mountain warfare ===
No two mountains are alike, but there is less oxygen at higher altitude. Fighting up a mountain can be very treacherous. There can be avalanches, rockslides, cliffs, and ambushes from higher up the slopes, and there are almost guaranteed to be caves somewhere in the mountain, as in Afghanistan.

=== Mud ===
Mud is a universal menace to all armies. While it does not hamper the use of air power, it slows and sometimes stops ground movements all together. The most common season for mud across the globe is spring. After the thawing of winter's snow and the addition of the rains that the season brings, the ground becomes very soft, and almost any military vehicle can get bogged down if it is not properly equipped. The mud is not always dependent on the spring. Rather, in some parts of the world, it is determined by the monsoons.

== Ocean fronts (harbors, beaches and sea cliffs) ==
=== Harbors ===
Capturing or defending a seaport presents distinct operational challenges compared to inland urban area's, as coastal defenses must protect against threats from the sea in addition to land and air. During an invasion, a harbor is commonly a primary objective because an invading force normally requires port facilities to sustain operations. A key challenge for attacking forces is securing the harbor before defenders can deny access by scuttling blockships to obstruct waterways or deploying naval mines . Conversely, defending a harbor is complex because defenders must counter maritime and aerial reconnaissance and attacks. Because ports are located along a nation's coastline, fixed harbor fortifications and coastal defenses have historically served as a primary deterrent when a large standing army or navy is unavailable. Historical harbor defense networks have combined coastal artillery, underwater minefields, patrol aircraft, and naval vessels to defend approaches, while utilizing blockships and mines to obstruct channels against an enemy

=== Beaches ===
Beaches have always been a favourable place for landings. Beaches with naturally shallow inclines are often used for deploying troops and armoured vehicles. Often, however, they can be blocked by mines and other anti-tank defences. This makes them a high risk place to land but, if there is no prior warning, a beach-landing can be a very effective route into enemy territory.

=== Sea cliffs ===
The same rules apply to this category as to the preceding one with the exception of the mines. Here there is almost no need for anti-vehicle mines, and so, the defenses could be planned without much concern for an armored attack.

== Resources; future flashpoints ==
The Middle East contains numerous valuable resources that major nations may compete over when supplies begin to fall around the world. The first Gulf War was an example of the United States’ willingness to go to war to protect its access to the rich oilfields of the Persian Gulf. The strong military presence influenced some leaders to aid the United States with cheap oil, but over time those forces began to be viewed as a threat to the Muslim world. The attacks of September 11, 2001, have brought new hostilities to the region with the invasions of both Afghanistan and Iraq. Other hotspots around the globe centering on oil are the areas around Venezuela, the Caspian Sea region, and possibly the offshore oil deposits around Vietnam and China.

The most precious and most needed resource of all is water, and in some parts of the world, that is a very expensive resource to obtain. The most obvious areas that conflict may arise over disputes for water supplies would be in the desert, but at the moment oil is the most valuable liquid in the Middle East. However, oil will not always be there, and if those people are going to survive, they must have water. Several times, countries that are upriver have threatened to build dams across the rivers in order to cut off the country down river, starving that particular country of its water supply. This has been the case with both the Nile and the River Jordan, and the results in both cases have been the same: the countries that are down river have threatened retaliation if such an event should occur. As the global warming trend continues, weather patterns will continue to shift, and that means that some places will fall into a severe drought. These people may become desperate when they do not have the resources to obtain water if such a disaster should occur.

Global forested areas have experienced ongoing decline due to deforestation and land-use charges. As global fossil fuel supplies fluctuate or become less accessible, some energy analysts and researchers suggest that reliance on biomass - including firewood - for residential heating could increase in certain regions. Forests in parts of Latin America and the Pacific Islands have been identified in some regional assessments as significant sources of timber and fuelwood. In the South Pacific Islands, while imported petroleum fuels most commercial and domestic generators, wood fuel remains important for traditional uses and daily food preparation, with population growth and land clearance placing increasing pressure on native forest resources.

"Conflict diamonds" are a currency used to fund illegal weapons deals. Such diamonds are not sold through an internationally recognized company. They are conflict diamonds because warlords in Africa fight for these diamonds in order to sell them to acquire larger wealth and new weapons for continued fighting. The same is true for the gold fields in southern Africa.

== See also ==
- Military crest
- Loss of Strength Gradient
- Geostrategy
- Natural lines of drift
- Strategic depth
- Defence in depth
- Military geology

== Sources ==
- Baron De Jomini, Antoine Henri, The Art of War, Plain Label Books, (from original French) 1862 translation ISBN 1-60303-255-X

== Bibliography ==
- Bayles, William J. "Terrain Intelligence and Battlefield Success: a Historical Perspective." Engineer 23 (1993): 50–53.
- Cole, D.H. Imperial Military Geography: The Geographical Background of the Defense Problems of the British Commonwealth. London: S. Praed (1950).
- Collins, John M. Military Geography for Professionals and the Public. Washington, D.C.: National Defense University Press (1998).
- Dibb, Paul. "STRATEGIC TRENDS." Naval War College Review 54 (2001): 22–39.
- Dupuy, R. Ernest. World in Arms: A Study in Military Geography. Harrisburg, PA: Military Service Publishing Company (1940).
- Flint, Colin. The Geography of War and Peace: From Death Camps to Diplomats. Oxford: Oxford University Press (2005).
- Galgano, Francis, and Eugene J. Palka (eds.). Modern Military Geography. London: Routledge (2010).
- Johnson, Douglas Wilson. Topography and Strategy in the War. NY: Henry Holt (1917).
- Johnson, Douglas Wilson. Battlefields of the World, Western and Southern Fronts: A Study in Military Geography. Oxford: Oxford University Press (1921).
- Kirby, Robert F. "Why Study Military Geography?" Engineer 20 (1990): 1–2.
- Kirsch, Scott, and Colin Flint (eds.). Reconstructing Conflict: Integrating War and Post-War Geographies. Burlington, VT: Ashgate (2011).
- Klare, Michael T. "The New Geography of Conflict." Foreign Affairs 80 (2001): 49–61.
- Olesik, Nikolai S. "Military Geography and Urbanistics." Military Thought 15 (2006): 81–91.
- Maguire, T. Miller. Outlines of Military Geography. Cambridge, MA: Cambridge University Press (1899)
- O'Sullivan, Patrick M. The Geography of War in the Post Cold War World. Lewiston: Edwin Mellen Press (2001).
- Palka, Eugene J., and Francis Galgano Jr. Military Geography: From Peace to War. Boston: McGraw-Hill (2005).
- Peltier, Louis C. Bibliography of Military Geography. Military Geography Committee, Association of American Geographers (1962).
- Peltier, Louis C., and G. Etzel Pearcy. Military Geography. Princeton, NJ: Van Nostrand (1966).
- Rech, M., Bos, D., Jenkings, K. N., Williams, A., & Woodward, R. Geography, military geography, and critical military studies. Critical Military Studies, 1(1), (2015): 47–60.
- Rosenburgh, Bob. "Training for Warfare." Soldiers 62 (2007): 34–36.
- Rottman, Gordon. L. World War II Pacific Island Guide: A Geo-Military Study. Westport: Greenwood Press (2002).
- Woodward, Rachel. Military Geographies. Malden, MA: Blackwell (2004).
- Zakharenko, I. A. "Military Geography: Past and Present." Military Thought 10 (2001): 32–37.
- The United States Air War College
- Powerpoint of Flashpoints
