= The Military Doctrine of Ukrainian Nationalists =

1940 book by M. F. Kolodzynsky

Воєнна доктрина українських націоналістів
- Author: Mychajło Kołodzinskyj (in Polish)
- Language: Ukrainian
- Publisher: Osnova
- Publication date: 1940, 1957, 2019
- Publication place: Poland (Kraków), Canada (Toronto), Ukraine (Kyiv)
- Pages: 288
- ISBN: 978-966-699-992-7

The Military Doctrine of Ukrainian Nationalists (Ukrainian: Воєнна доктрина українських націоналістів, romanized: Voienna doktryna ukrainskykh natsionalistiv) is a book by the military theorist of the OUN, commander of the armed forces of Carpatho-Ukraine, colonel Mykhailo F. Kolodzinskyi.

== Content ==
The book consists of three parts:

- the first part concerns history and politics;
- the second part is a review of the borders of Ukraine;
- the third part discusses the strategy of the Ukrainian liberation war.

The content of the book is replete with calls for anti-Jewish pogroms and vandalism.

Kolodzinskyi considered the need to encourage the broad masses in the struggle for statehood to be very important; create a single centralized nationalist government by eliminating all competitive governments and politicians; transform partisans detachments into a regular army; eliminate autocratic atamans. The doctrine foresaw the cleansing of Western Ukrainian lands from Poles and partly from other minorities that were hostile to Ukrainian independence, in particular Jews.
