= Containment building =

Structure surrounding a nuclear reactor to prevent radioactive releases

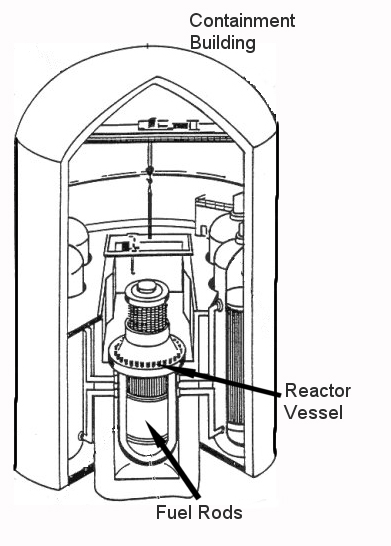
NRC drawing of the containment building from a pressurized water reactor

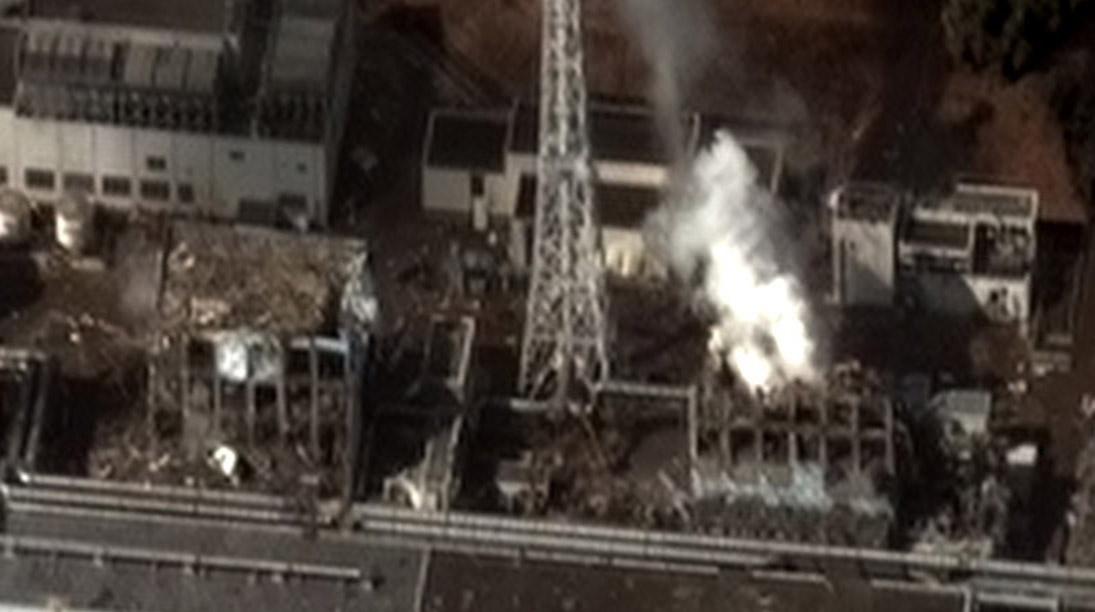
Reactor Unit 3 (right) and Unit 4 (left) of Fukushima Daiichi on 16 March 2011. Three of the reactors overheated, causing meltdowns which released radioactive material out of their containment structures.

A containment building is a reinforced steel, concrete or lead structure enclosing a nuclear reactor. It is designed, in any emergency, to contain the escape of radioactive steam or gas to a maximum pressure in the range of 275 to 550 kPa (40 to 80 psi). The containment is the fourth and final barrier to radioactive release (part of a nuclear reactor's defence in depth strategy), the first being the fuel ceramic itself, the second being the metal fuel cladding tubes, the third being the reactor vessel and coolant system.

Each nuclear plant in the United States is designed to withstand certain conditions which are spelled out as "Design Basis Accidents" in the Final Safety Analysis Report (FSAR). The FSAR is available for public viewing, usually at a public library near the nuclear plant.

The containment building itself is typically an airtight steel structure enclosing the reactor, normally sealed off from the outside atmosphere. The steel is either free-standing or attached to the concrete missile shield. In the United States, the design and thickness of the containment and the missile shield are governed by federal regulations (10 CFR 50.55a), and must be strong enough to withstand the impact of a fully loaded passenger airliner without rupture.

While the containment plays a critical role in the most severe nuclear reactor accidents, it is only designed to contain or condense steam in the short term (for large break accidents) and long term heat removal still must be provided by other systems. In the Three Mile Island accident, the containment pressure boundary was maintained, but due to insufficient cooling, some time after the accident, radioactive gas was intentionally released from containment by operators to prevent over pressurization. This, combined with further failures, caused the release of up to 13 million curies of radioactive gas to atmosphere during the accident.

While the Fukushima Daiichi plant had operated safely since 1971, an earthquake and tsunami well beyond the design basis resulted in failure of AC power, backup generators and batteries which defeated all safety systems. These systems were necessary to keep the fuel cool after the reactor had been shut down. This resulted in partial or complete meltdown of fuel rods, damage to fuel storage pools and buildings, release of radioactive debris to surrounding area, air and sea, and resorting to the expedient use of fire engines and concrete pumps to deliver cooling water to spent fuel pools and containment. During the incident, pressure within the containments of reactors 1–3 rose to exceed design limits, which despite attempts to reduce pressure by venting radioactive gases, resulted in breach of containment. Hydrogen leaking from the containment mixed with air, resulted in explosions in units 1, 3 and 4, complicating attempts to stabilize the reactors.

== Types ==
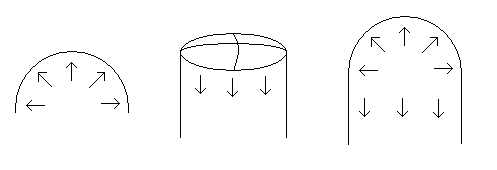
If the outward pressure from steam in a limiting accident is the dominant force, containments tend towards a spherical design, whereas if weight of the structure is the dominant force, designs tend towards a can design. Modern designs tend towards a combination.

Containment systems for nuclear power reactors are distinguished by size, shape, materials used, and suppression systems. The kind of containment used is determined by the type of reactor, generation of the reactor, and the specific plant needs.

Suppression systems are critical to safety analysis and greatly affect the size of containment. Suppression refers to condensing the steam after a major break has released it from the cooling system. Because decay heat does not go away quickly, there must be some long term method of suppression, but this may simply be heat exchange with the ambient air on the surface of containment. There are several common designs, but for safety-analysis purposes containments are categorized as either "large-dry", "sub-atmospheric", or "ice-condenser".

=== Pressurized water reactors ===
For a pressurized water reactor, the containment also encloses the steam generators and the pressurizer, and is the entire reactor building. The missile shield around it is typically a tall cylindrical or domed building. PWR containments are typically large (up to seven times larger than a BWR) because the containment strategy during the leakage design basis accident entails providing adequate volume for the steam/air mixture that results from a loss-of-coolant-accident to expand into, limiting the ultimate pressure (driving force for leakage) reached in the containment building.

Early designs including Siemens, Westinghouse, and Combustion Engineering had a mostly can-like shape built with reinforced concrete. As concrete has a very good compression strength compared to tensile, this is a logical design for the building materials since the extremely heavy top part of containment exerts a large downward force that prevents some tensile stress if containment pressure were to suddenly rise. As reactor designs have evolved, many nearly spherical containment designs for PWRs have also been constructed. Depending on the material used, this is the most apparently logical design because a sphere is the best structure for simply containing a large pressure. Most current PWR designs involve some combination of the two, with a cylindrical lower part and a half-spherical top.

Modern designs have also shifted more towards using steel containment structures. In some cases steel is used to line the inside of the concrete, which contributes strength from both materials in the hypothetical case that containment becomes highly pressurized. Yet other newer designs call for both a steel and concrete containment – which is in decades long use in the current German PWR-designs – notably the AP1000 and the European Pressurized Reactor plan to use both; which gives missile protection by the outer concrete and pressurizing ability by the inner steel structure. The AP1000 has planned vents at the bottom of the concrete structure surrounding the steel structure under the logic that it would help move air over the steel structure and cool containment in the event of a major accident (in a similar way to how a cooling tower works).

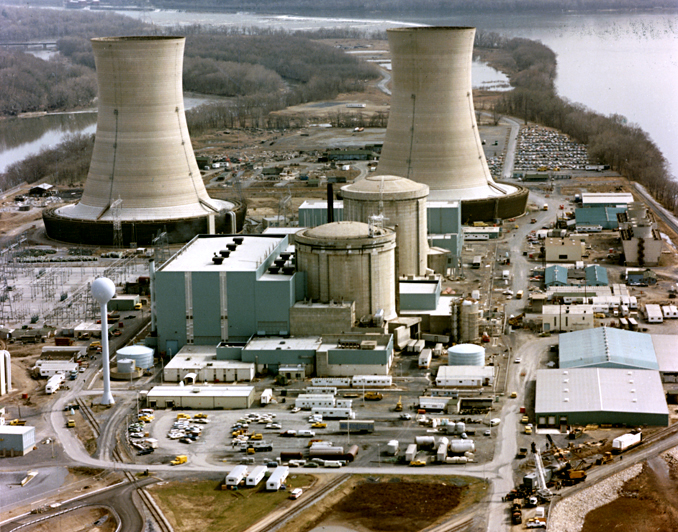
Three Mile Island was an early PWR design by Babcock & Wilcox, and shows a 'can' containment design that is common to all of its generations.

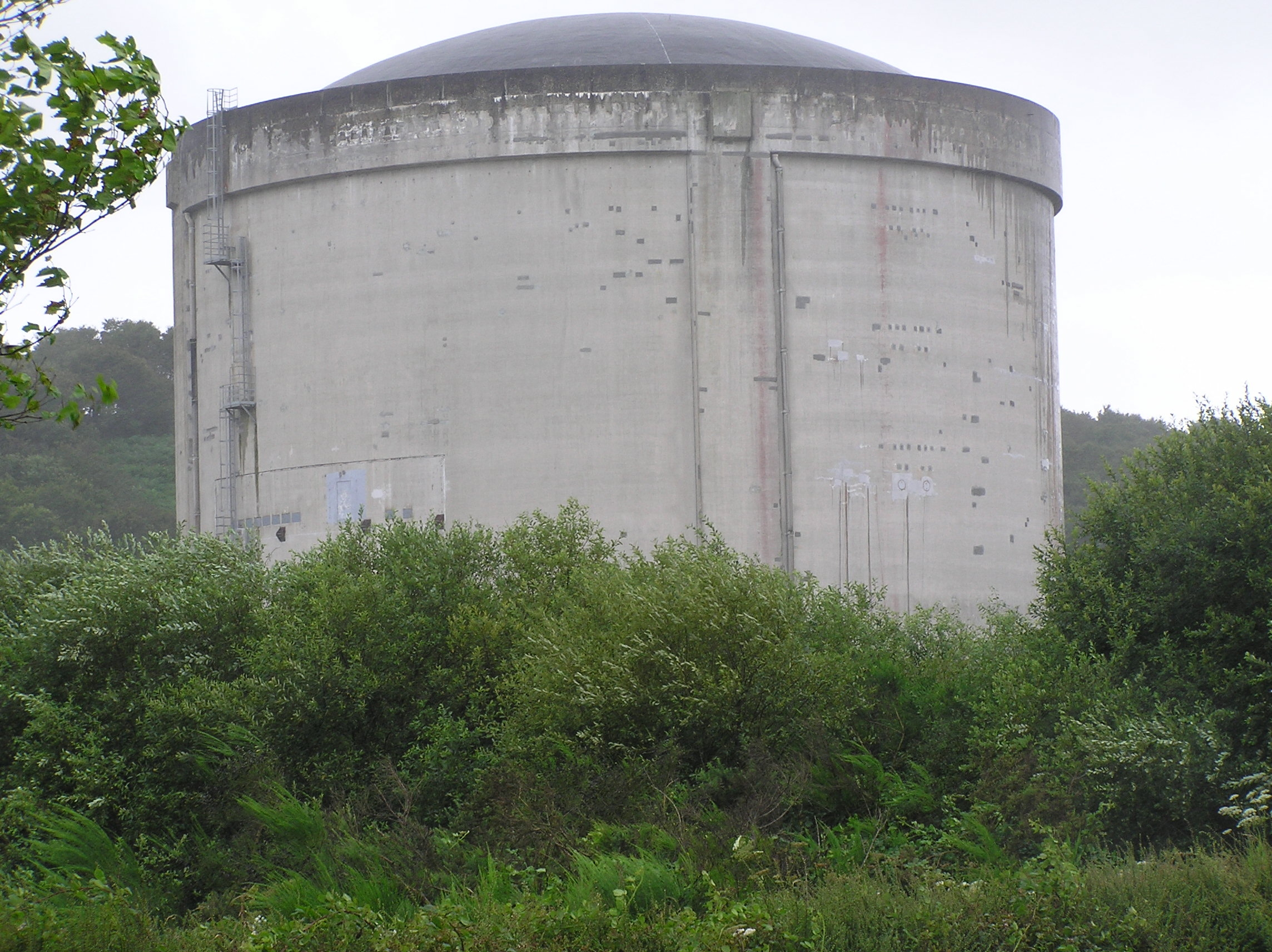
A more detailed image for the 'can' type containment from the French Brennilis Nuclear Power Plant

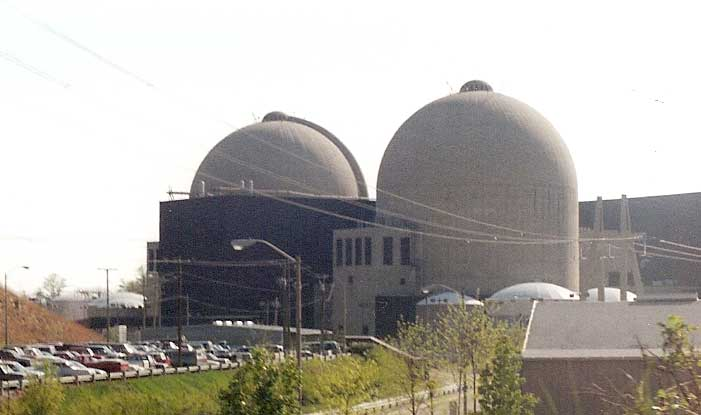
The twin PWR reactor containments at the Cook Nuclear Plant in Michigan

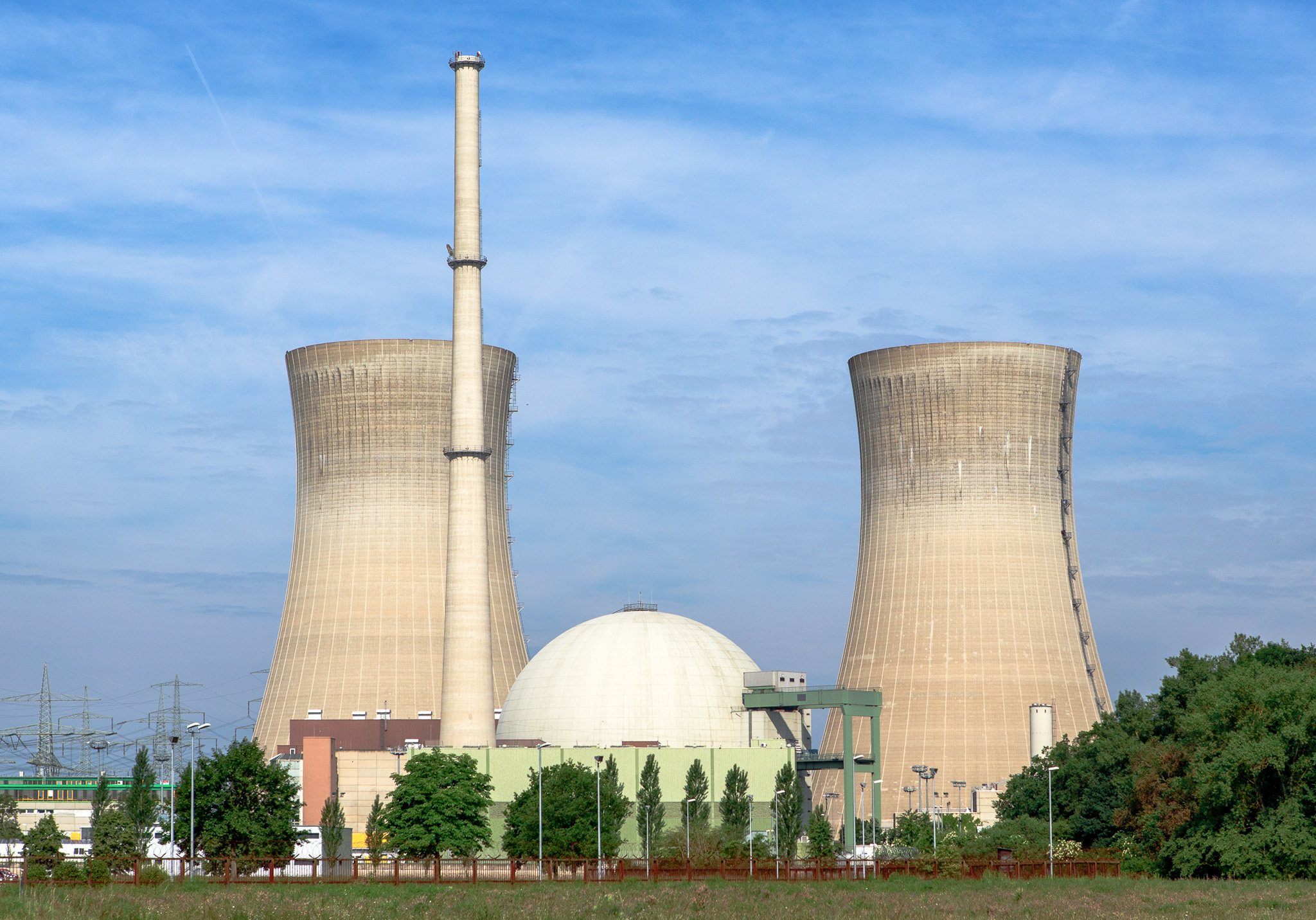
German Grafenrheinfeld plant exhibiting a nearly completely spherical containment design, which is very common for German PWRs; it is a double-containment with an inner steel shell.

The Russian VVER-1000 design is mostly the same as other modern PWRs in regards to containment, as it is a PWR itself. However, the VVER-440-type has a significantly more vulnerable containment, in the form of a so-called bubble condensor with relatively low design pressure.

=== Light water graphite reactors ===
Light water graphite reactors were built only in the USSR. RBMK designs used secondary containment-like structures, but the reactor's top plate was a part of the protective structure. During the Chernobyl accident in 1986 the plate suffered a pressure beyond the predicted limits and lifted up.

=== Boiling water reactors ===
Cross-section sketch of a typical BWR Mark I containment

In a BWR, the containment strategy is different. A BWR's containment consists of a drywell, where the reactor and associated cooling equipment is located, and a wetwell. The drywell is much smaller than a PWR containment and plays a larger role. During the theoretical leakage design basis accident, the reactor coolant flashes to steam in the drywell, pressurizing it rapidly. Vent pipes or tubes from the drywell direct the steam below the water level maintained in the wetwell (also known as a torus or suppression pool), condensing the steam, limiting the pressure ultimately reached. Both the drywell and the wetwell are enclosed by a secondary containment building, maintained at a slight sub-atmospheric or negative pressure during normal operation and refueling operations.

Common containment designs are referred to by the names Mark I, Mark II, and Mark III. The Mark I is the oldest, distinguished by a drywell which resembles an inverted lightbulb above the wetwell which is a steel torus containing water. The Mark II was used with late BWR-4 and BWR-5 reactors. It is called an "over-under" configuration with the drywell forming a truncated cone on a concrete slab. Below is a cylindrical suppression chamber made of concrete rather than just sheet metal. Both use a lightweight steel or concrete "secondary containment" over the top floor which is kept at a slight negative pressure so that air can be filtered. The top level is a large open space with an overhead crane suspended between the two long walls for moving heavy fuel caskets from the ground floor, and removing / replacing hardware from the reactor and reactor well. The reactor well can be flooded and is straddled by pools separated by gates on either side for storing reactor hardware normally placed above the fuel rods, and for fuel storage. A refueling platform has a specialized telescoping mast for lifting and lowering fuel rod assemblies with precision through the "cattle chute" to the reactor core area. The Mark III uses a concrete dome, somewhat like PWRs, and has a separate building for storing used fuel rods on a different floor level. All three types also use the large body of water in the suppression pools to quench steam released from the reactor system during transients.

The Mark I containment was used in those reactors at the Fukushima I Nuclear Power Plant which were involved in the Fukushima I nuclear accidents. The site suffered from a combination of two beyond design-basis events, a powerful earthquake, which may have damaged reactor plumbing and structures, and 15 meter tsunami, which destroyed fuel tanks, generators and wiring, causing back up generators to fail, and battery-powered pumps also eventually failed. Insufficient cooling and failure of pumps needed to restore water lost to boiling off led to partial or possible complete meltdowns of fuel rods which were completely uncovered by water. This led to releases of significant amounts of radioactive material to the air and sea, and hydrogen explosions. The thin secondary containments were not designed to withstand hydrogen explosions, and suffered blown out or destroyed roofs and walls, and destruction of all equipment on the refueling floor including cranes and refueling platform. Unit 3 suffered a particularly spectacular explosion which created a plume of debris over 300 m high which resulted in a collapse of the north end of the top floor, and buckled concrete columns on its west side as can be seen by aerial photographs. Although they were fitted with modified hardened vent systems to vent hydrogen into exhaust stacks, they may have not been effective without power. Even before the Fukushima incident, Mark I containment had been criticized as being more likely to fail during a blackout.

From a distance, the BWR design looks very different from PWR designs because usually a square building is used for the secondary containment. Also, because there is only one loop through the turbines and reactor, and the steam going through the turbines is also radioactive, the turbine building has to be considerably shielded as well. This leads to two buildings of similar construction, with the higher one housing the reactor and the long one housing the turbine hall and supporting structures.

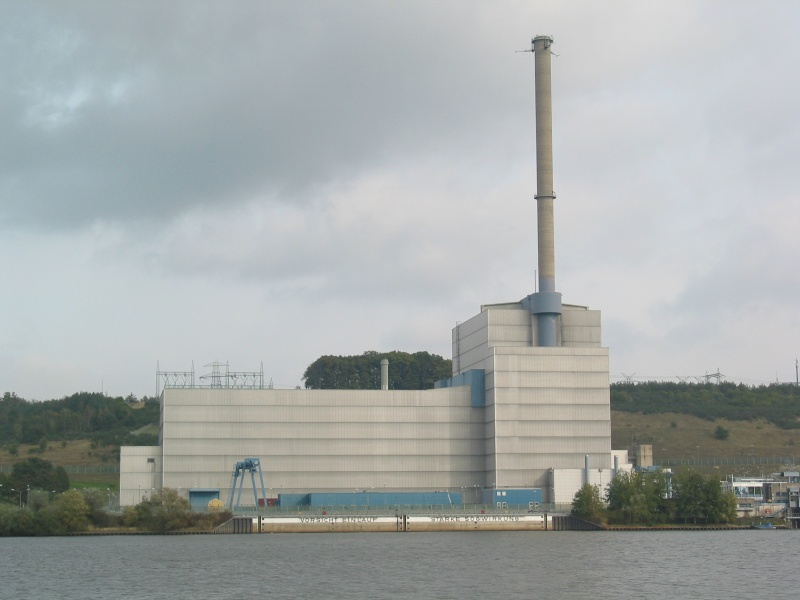
The former German BWR-unit Krümmel; the steel containment is within the reactor building on the right.

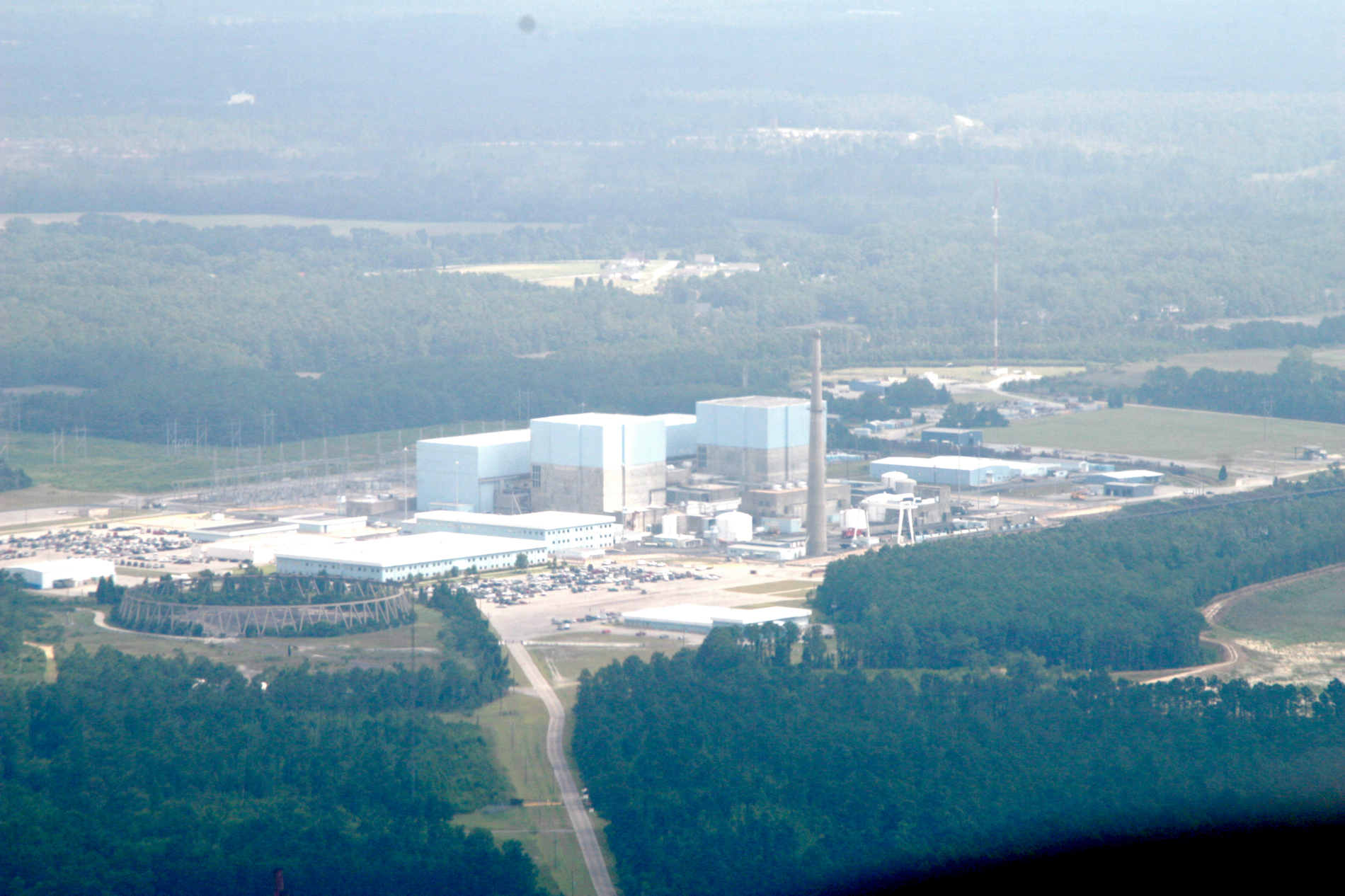
A typical two-unit US-BWR at the Brunswick Nuclear Generating Station; the containments (Mark I) are within the cubical shield buildings too.

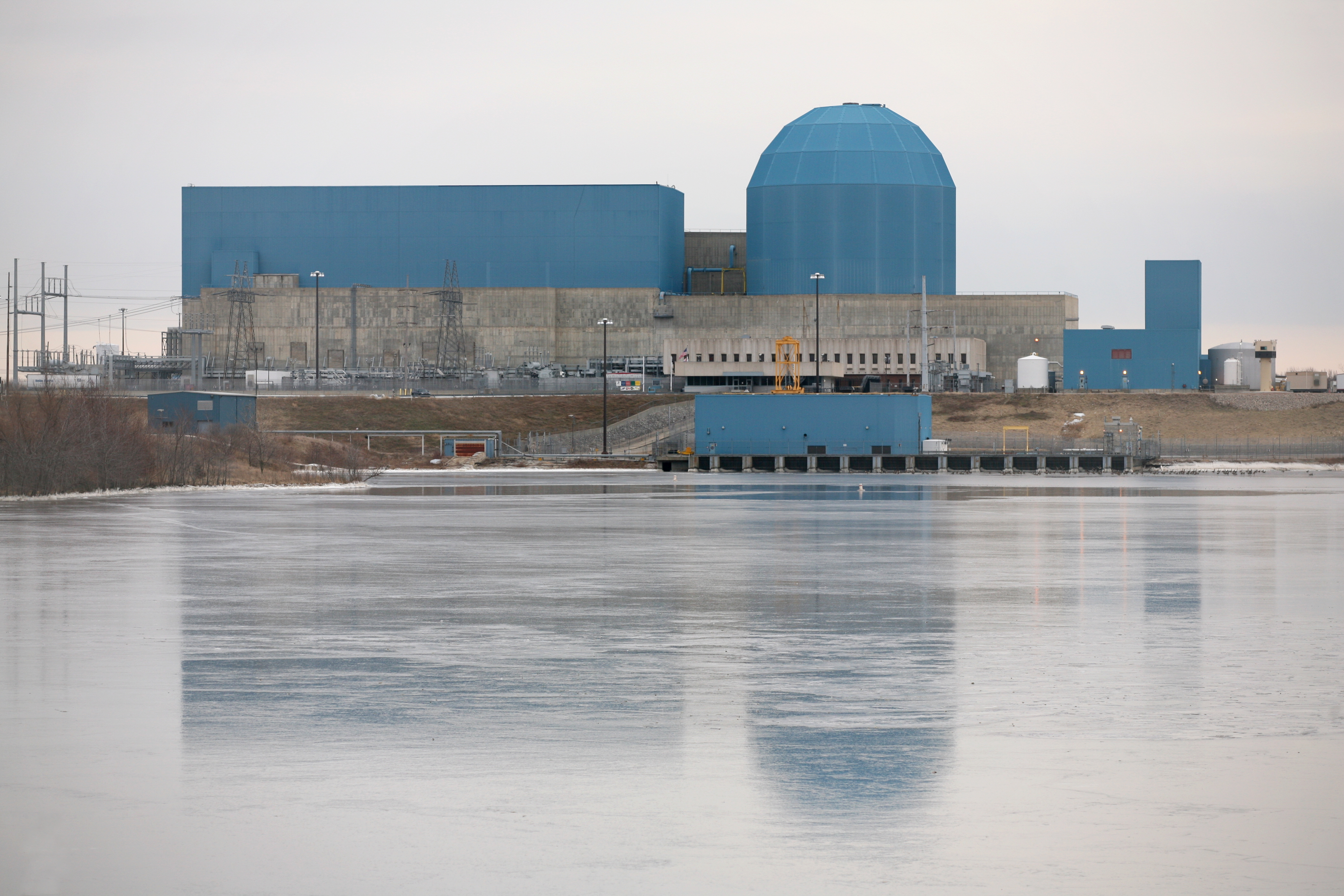
Modern plants have tended towards a design that is not completely cylindrical or spherical, like this containment within the blue painted reactor building of the Clinton Nuclear Generating Station.

=== CANDU plants ===
CANDU power stations, named after Canadian-invented Deuterium-Uranium design, make use of a wider variety of containment designs and suppression systems than other plant designs. Due to the nature of the core design, the size of containment for the same power rating is often larger than for a typical PWR, but many innovations have reduced this requirement.

Many multiunit CANDU stations utilize a water spray equipped vacuum building. All individual CANDU units on site are connected to this vacuum building by a large pressure relief duct which is also part of containment. The vacuum building rapidly draws in and condenses any steam from a postulated break, allowing the reactor building pressure to return to subatmospheric conditions. This minimizes any possible fission product release to the environment.

Additionally, there have been similar designs that use double containment, in which containment from two units are connected allowing a larger containment volume in the case of any major incident. This has been pioneered by the Indian IPHWR design where a double unit and suppression pool was implemented.

The most recent CANDU designs, however, call for a single conventional dry containment for each unit.

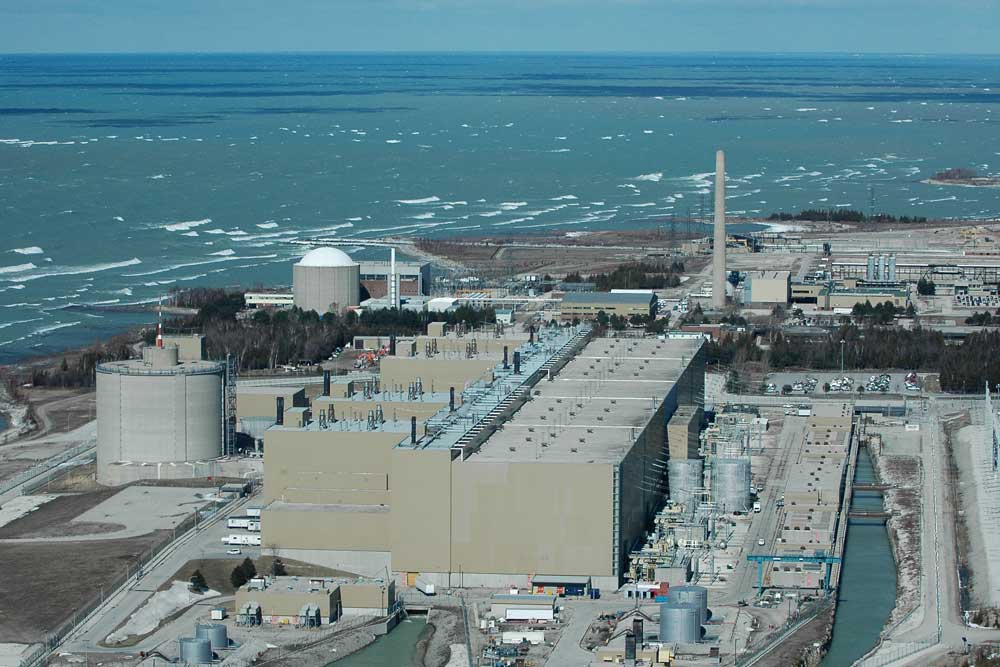
The Bruce B Generating Station, showing a large vacuum building (left) serving 4 separate units that have a BWR-like shield building around them individually

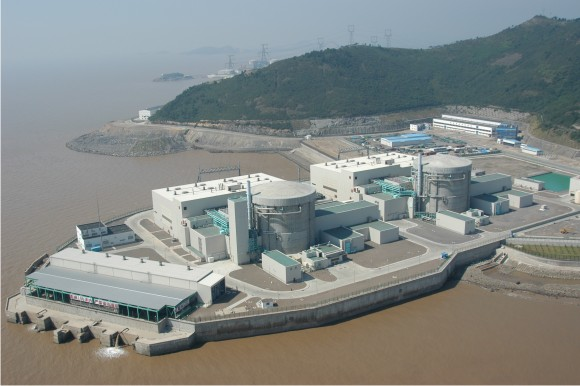
Qinshan phase III consists of two CANDU units where the containment system is autonomous for each unit.

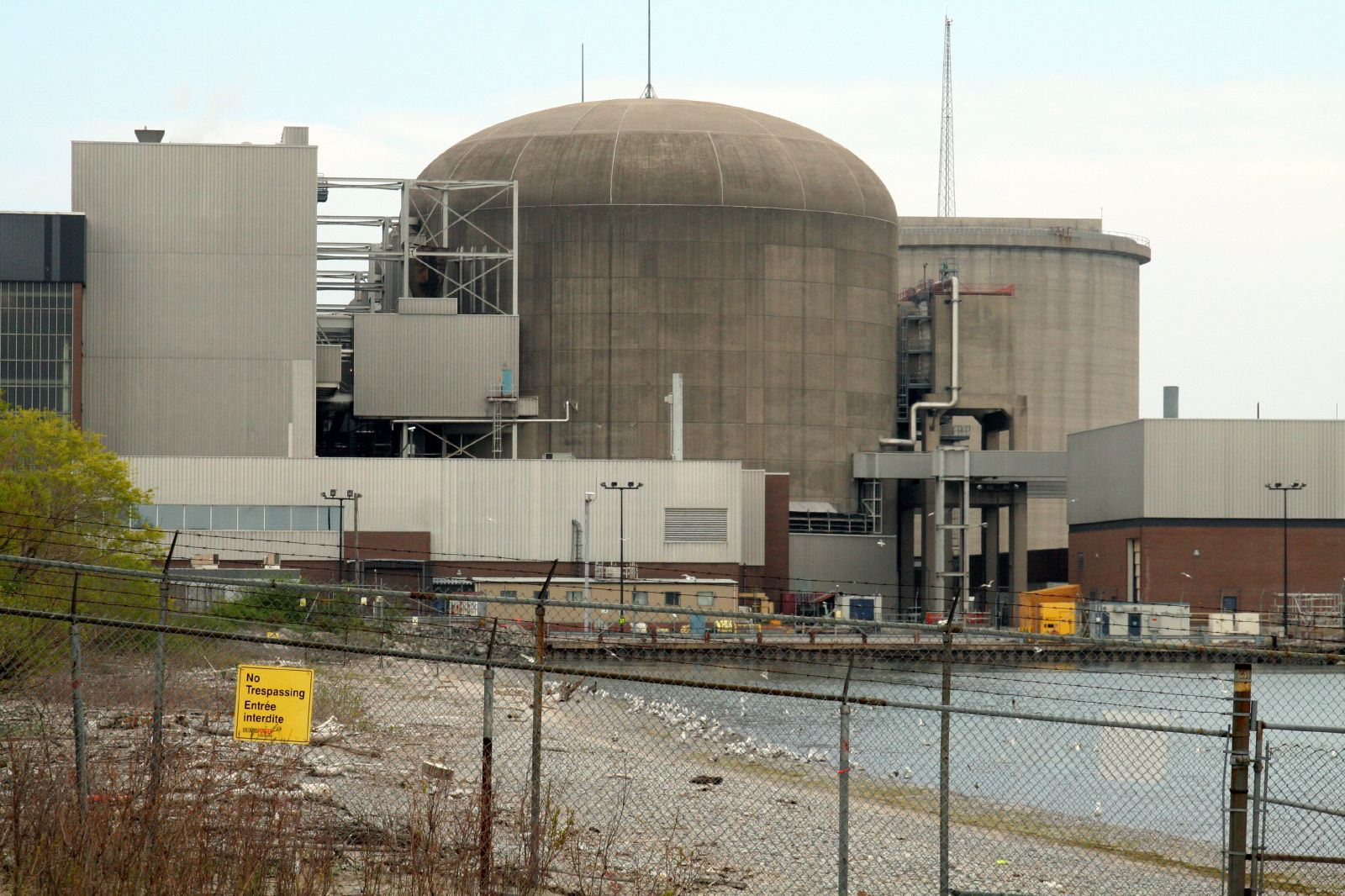
A single unit of the Pickering Nuclear Generating Station, showing a slightly different shape from a typical PWR containment, which is mostly due to the larger footprint required by the CANDU design. The vacuum building can be seen partly obscured on the right.

=== Design and testing requirements ===
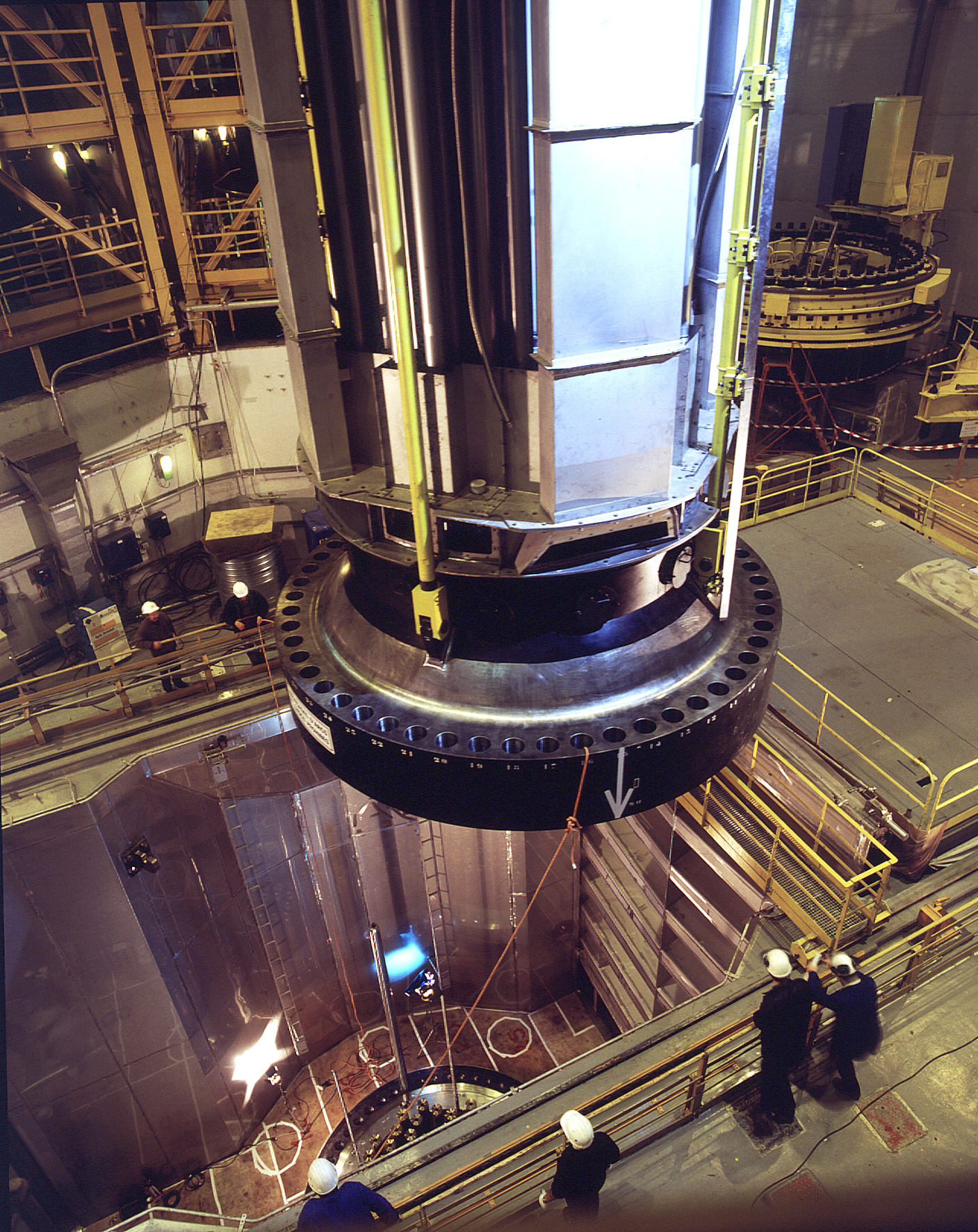
U.S. Nuclear Regulatory Commission image of the Containment area inside a Containment building

In the United States, Title 10 of the Code of Federal Regulations, Part 50, Appendix A, General Design Criteria (GDC 54-57) or some other design basis provides the basic design criteria for isolation of lines penetrating the containment wall. Each large pipe penetrating the containment, such as the steam lines, has isolation valves on it, configured as allowed by Appendix A; generally two valves. For smaller lines, one on the inside and one on the outside. For large, high-pressure lines, space for relief valves and maintenance considerations cause the designers to install the isolation valves near to where the lines exit containment. In the event of a leak in the high-pressure piping that carries the reactor coolant, these valves rapidly close to prevent radioactivity from escaping the containment. Valves on lines for standby systems penetrating containment are normally closed. The containment isolation valves may also close on a variety of other signals such as the containment high pressure experienced during a high-energy line break (e.g. main steam or feedwater lines). The containment building serves to contain the steam/resultant pressure, but there is typically no radiological consequences associated with such a break at a pressurized water reactor.

During normal operation, the containment is air-tight and access is only through marine style airlocks. High air temperature and radiation from the core limit the time, measured in minutes, people can spend inside containment while the plant is operating at full power. In the event of a worst-case emergency, called a "design basis accident" in NRC regulations, the containment is designed to seal off and contain a meltdown. Redundant systems are installed to prevent a meltdown, but as a matter of policy, one is assumed to occur and thus the requirement for a containment building. For design purposes, the reactor vessel's piping is assumed to be breached, causing a "LOCA" (Loss Of Coolant Accident) where the water in the reactor vessel is released to the atmosphere inside the containment and flashes into steam. The resulting pressure increase inside the containment, which is designed to withstand the pressure, triggers containment sprays ("dousing sprays") to turn on to condense the steam and thus reduce the pressure. A SCRAM ("neutronic trip") initiates very shortly after the break occurs. The safety systems close non-essential lines into the air-tight containment by shutting the isolation valves. Emergency Core Cooling Systems are quickly turned on to cool the fuel and prevent it from melting. The exact sequence of events depends on the reactor design.

Containment buildings in the U.S. are subjected to mandatory testing of the containment and containment isolation provisions under 10 CFR Part 50, Appendix J. Containment Integrated Leakage Rate Tests (Type "A" tests or CILRTs) are performed on a 15-year basis. Local Leakage Rate Tests (Type B or Type C testing, or LLRTs) are performed much more frequently, both to identify the possible leakage in an accident and to locate and fix leakage paths. LLRTs are performed on containment isolation valves, hatches and other appurtenances penetrating the containment. A nuclear plant is required by its operating license to prove containment integrity prior to restarting the reactor after each shutdown. The requirement can be met with satisfactory local or integrated test results (or a combination of both when an ILRT is performed).

In 1988, Sandia National Laboratories conducted a test of slamming a jet fighter into a large concrete block at 775 km/h (482 mph). The airplane left only a 64-millimetre-deep (2.5 in) gouge in the concrete. Although the block was not constructed like a containment building missile shield and the experiment was not designed to demonstrate the strength of a nuclear power plant's containment structure, the results were considered indicative. A subsequent study by EPRI, the Electric Power Research Institute, concluded that commercial airliners did not pose a danger.

The Turkey Point Nuclear Generating Station was hit directly by Hurricane Andrew in 1992. Turkey Point has two fossil fuel units and two nuclear units. Over $90 million of damage was done, largely to a water tank and to a smokestack of one of the fossil-fueled units on-site, but the containment buildings were undamaged.

== See also ==
- Filtered Containment Venting System
- Nuclear power
- State-of-the-Art Reactor Consequence Analyses, a new Nuclear Regulatory Commission study
- Chernobyl New Safe Confinement
- Chernobyl sarcophagus, replaced by the New Safe Confinement.
