= Filtered Containment Venting System =

A Filtered Containment Venting System (FCVS) is an accident management system designed to minimize the release of fission products when releasing the pressure of the containment building in the case of a severe nuclear accident. As a Severe Accident Management Measure (SAMM), containment venting cannot prevent a meltdown but can help alleviate its consequences on the environment.

== Principle ==
Most nuclear power plants feature a containment building whose role is to be the ultimate barrier, as per the defense-in-depth principle, against the release of radionuclides in the environment during accidents involving partial or total reactor core damage, that is, in which the integrity of the nuclear fuel (first barrier) is lost. In the most severe of such scenarios, if the fuel remains insufficiently cooled for prolonged periods of time, the integrity of the primary system (second barrier) can be threatened as well, for example if a substantial mass of molten fuel (corium) reaches the bottom of the reactor pressure vessel and melts through it. At this point most of the cooling water of the primary circuit will have been released into the containment atmosphere if it had not already been released through a pipe rupture (LOCA), along with volatile fission products such as caesium and iodine from the molten fuel, thereby increasing containment pressure. Although nuclear power plants are equipped with systems designed to cool the containment atmosphere (such as containment spray systems), these may be unavailable in the case of a severe accident (for example a Station Blackout in which all power is lost). In this case, uncontrolled releases of radionuclides due to containment failure can be avoided by venting its atmosphere to decrease pressure.

There are two main types of FCVS:

1. Dry, using a gravel or sand-bed filter
2. Wet, using a scrubber in a liquid solution

Both allow the removal of most of the aerosols (including caesium, >99.9%) and iodine ( >99% in elemental form) contained in the vented atmosphere.

== Historical usage ==
Historically in terms of accident usage, a primitive scrubber on a first generation gas cooled reactor, reduced the emission of radioisotopes from the Windscale fire in 1957. The scrubber, which prior to its scrubbing services being called upon, was derisively known as Cockcroft's Folly after the scientist John Cockcroft, who had insisted on its incorporation with the facility. Following the fire and Cockcroft's scrubber reducing the quantity of material that escaped into the greater environment, "the word folly did not seem appropriate after the accident".

The modern concept of FCVS was born from the conclusions of the WASH-1400 report and the consequences of the Three Mile Island accident in the late 1970s, and its implementation in Western Europe was accelerated by the occurrence of the Chernobyl nuclear disaster in 1986. It was realized that some accident scenarios would lead to substantial releases of radionuclides in the environment that were deemed unacceptable especially in countries in which nuclear power plants are close to population centers, such as Western Europe.

During the late 1980s and early 1990s, FCVS were back-fitted to existing nuclear power plants in France, Germany, Sweden, Switzerland and Finland (except for the VVER at Loviisa). In Germany, the device is nicknamed Wallmann-Ventil after then environment minister Walter Wallmann who was in charge of nuclear safety at the time. By the 2010s, FCVS had been installed in Bulgaria, Canada, and the Netherlands. However, the Fukushima Daiichi Nuclear Power Plant involved in the 2011 Fukushima Daiichi nuclear disaster was not equipped with FCVS. Had the plant had a FCVS, the amount of radionuclides released during the accident would almost certainly have been lower. After this accident many other countries decided to upgrade their power plants with FCVS, including Belgium, China, Japan, South Korea, Spain and Romania. Furthermore, by 2014 such upgrades were being discussion in the Czech Republic, Slovakia, and Russia (for some plants).

== Suppliers ==
AREVA and Westinghouse Electric Company deliver FCVS.
