= Military geology =

Geological theory applied to warfare

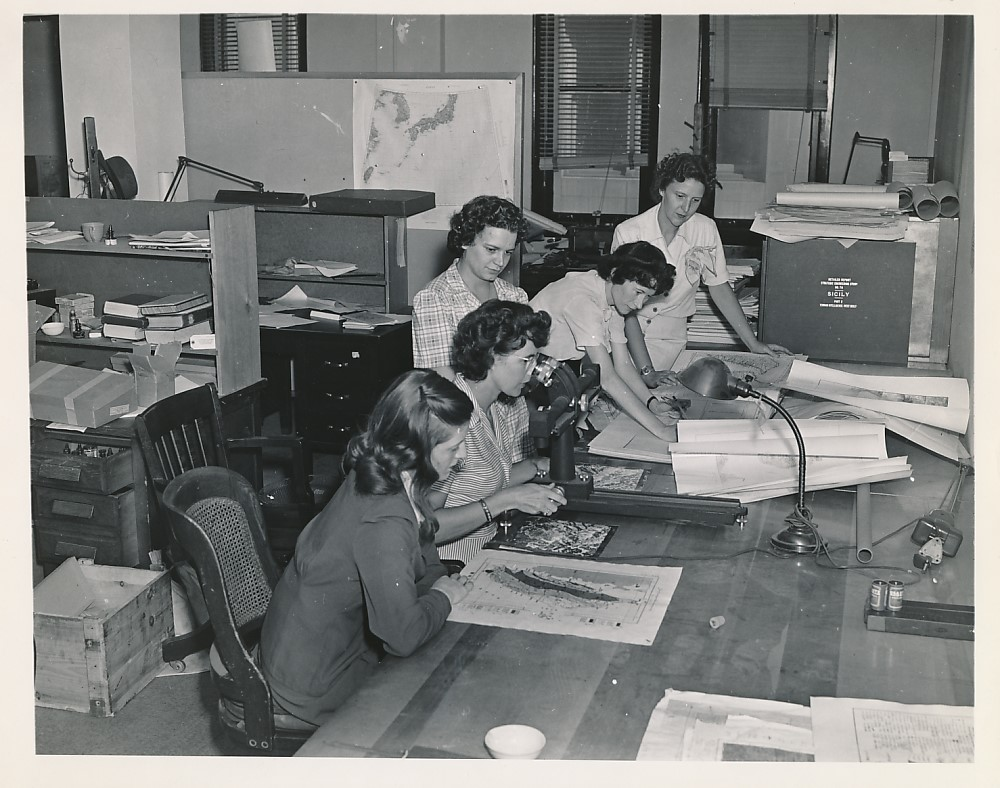
Geologists with the USGS Military Geology Unit working on maps during World War II. Ruth A. M. Schmidt is in the center.

Military geology is the application of geological theory to warfare and the peacetime practices of the military. The formal practice of military geology began during the Napoleonic Wars; however, geotechnical knowledge has been applied since the earliest days of siege warfare. In modern warfare military geologists are used for terrain analysis, engineering, and the identification of resources. Military geologists have included both specially trained military personnel and civilians incorporated into the military. The peacetime application of military geology includes the building of infrastructure, typically during local emergencies or foreign peacekeeping deployments.

Warfare can change the physical geology. Examples of this include artillery shattering the bedrock on the Western Front during World War I and the detonation of nuclear weapons creating new rock types. Military research has also led to many important geological discoveries.

== Terrain analysis ==
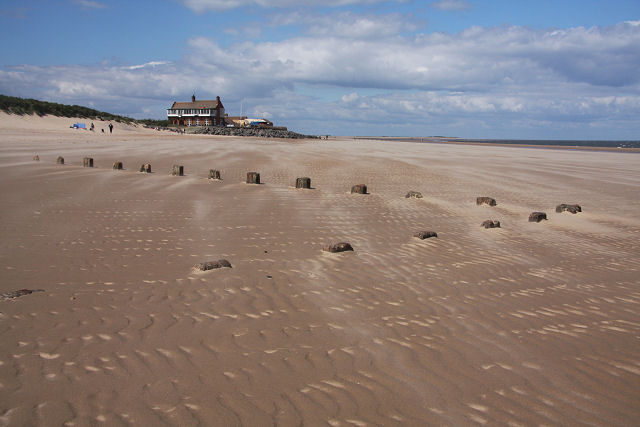
Brancaster beach in England was used for amphibious tank practice as its sand was similar to that of Normandy.

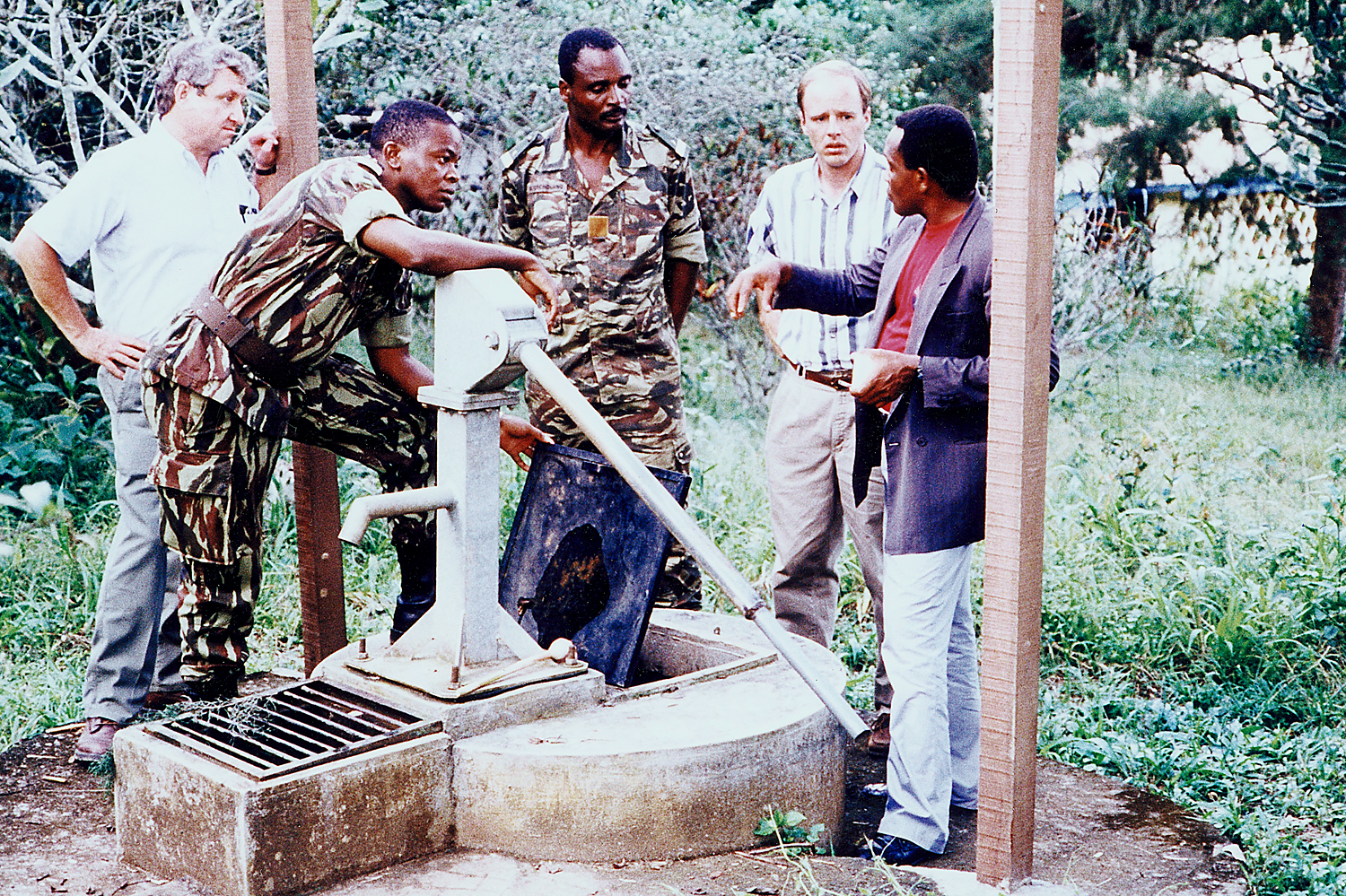
The U.S. Army Corps of Engineers drilling a well in Cameroon as part of the "Civic Action" project

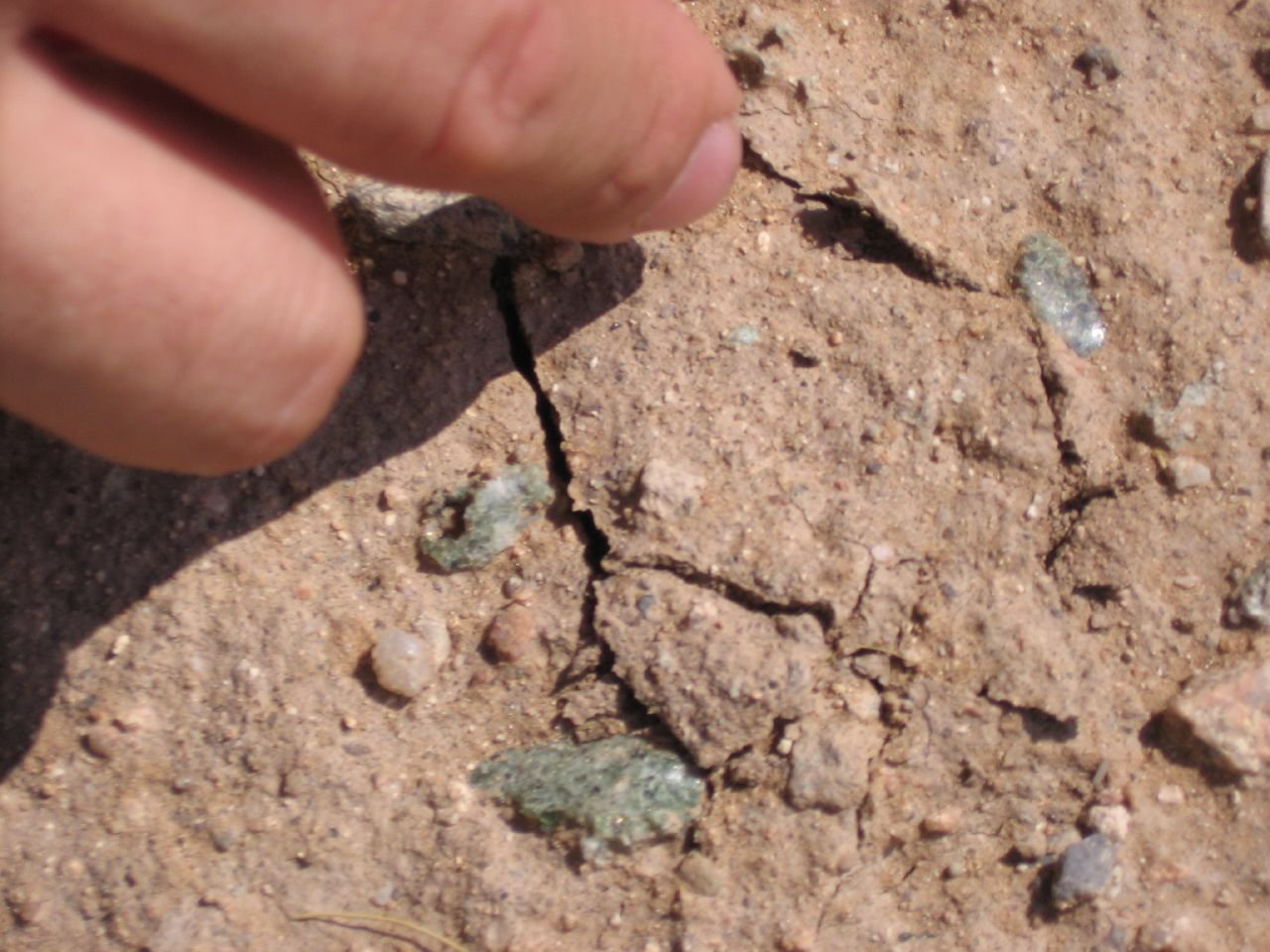
Trinitite (in green) produced by the Trinity Nuclear Test

Geologists have been employed since the Napoleonic Wars to provide an analysis of terrain which was expected to become a war theater, both in case of an upcoming battle and to assess the difficulty of logistical supply. Academically, it has been found that battles are likely to occur on rocks of Permian, Triassic, or Upper Carboniferous age, possibly due to their typical relief and drainage. More practically, geology has been used in identifying the best Allied invasion sites during World War II, including those in North Africa, Italy, and France. This included studying the properties of the sand of Normandy beaches, the tolerance of the soil in the hinterland to bombardment, the sediment of the English Channel sea floor, and the occurrence of landslides in Sicily. Likewise, German geologists created maps of southern England for Operation Sea Lion, identifying quarry locations and the suitability of rock types to excavate trenches, etc.

In the Demilitarized Zone between North and South Korea, very rugged terrain is due to the structure of metamorphic rocks, while the best flat land is underlain by granite. During the Korean War, these flat areas were used as military staging grounds by the North Koreans. It has been suggested that an understanding of the fracture and foliation patterns of the metamorphic rocks could help a field commander.

This field partially overlaps with military geography. For this reason the British Army employed geographers in this role until the end of 1941, when it joined international common practice and started using geologists.

== Geotechnical engineering ==
Geologists have been involved in the construction of forts, tunnels, and bunkers both during military conflicts and in peacetime. This included digging tunnels in northeastern Italy and Austria during the so-called mine war in World War I. The rocks of the Dolomites are different from those in other theaters and specialists were required in order to design the tunnels. Explosives were then put in the tunnels and detonated, to cause rock falls and undercut enemy troops.

Geology is also used in determining the likely resistance of enemy defenses to shelling and bombing. In World War II, this task was performed by the Allies as they advanced across German-occupied Europe, assessing the likely effect of bombing bridges and shelling defenses in light of the local geology. During peacetime, similar methods have been used, such as the decision to locate the American Strategic Petroleum Reserve in the salt domes of the Gulf Coast.

== Resource acquisition ==
Geologists are used to determine both the location and accessibility of strategic and tactical resources during war. In the case of the D Day landings and the 2003 invasion of Iraq, ground water and aggregate were the two most important geological resources to identify for the campaign. The aggregate was required both for roading metal and for the construction of airfields. Since 1966, the German Army has also been using geologists to mitigate and predict the environmental effects of civilian resource extraction.

== Forensics ==
Simplification of GeoRef citations of military geology papers. Note the increase for the two world wars. View source data.

Geology has been used in many military intelligence investigations. During World War II, the American Military Geology Unit discovered the origin of balloon bombs which had been dispatched towards North America from Japan. They accomplished this by determining from which beach the sand in the balloon's ballast originated. Knowledge of rock types and seismic propagation also allows geologists to distinguish between natural and nuclear test initiated earthquakes.

== Effect of warfare on rocks ==
Military activity affects the physical geology. This was first noted through the intensive shelling on the Western Front during World War I, which caused the shattering of the bedrock and changed the rocks' permeability. New minerals, rocks, and land-forms are also a byproduct of nuclear testing.

== Discoveries by military ==
Military research has led to many geological discoveries; however, secrecy has often delayed some of the possible progress. The Austrian Army of World War I included geologists called Kriegsgeologen who were allowed to carry out non-military scientific investigation during the war. Discoveries have included new natural resource deposits and the mapping of magnetic stripes on the ocean floor, leading to the idea of plate tectonics.

== See also ==
- 24th Waffen Mountain Division of the SS Karstjäger
- Australian Mining Corps
- Military Geology Unit
- Tunnelling companies of the Royal Engineers
- U.S. Army Corps of Engineers
- People's Armed Police Gold Corps
