= 24th Waffen Mountain Division of the SS Karstjäger =

German military unit in World War II (1944–45)

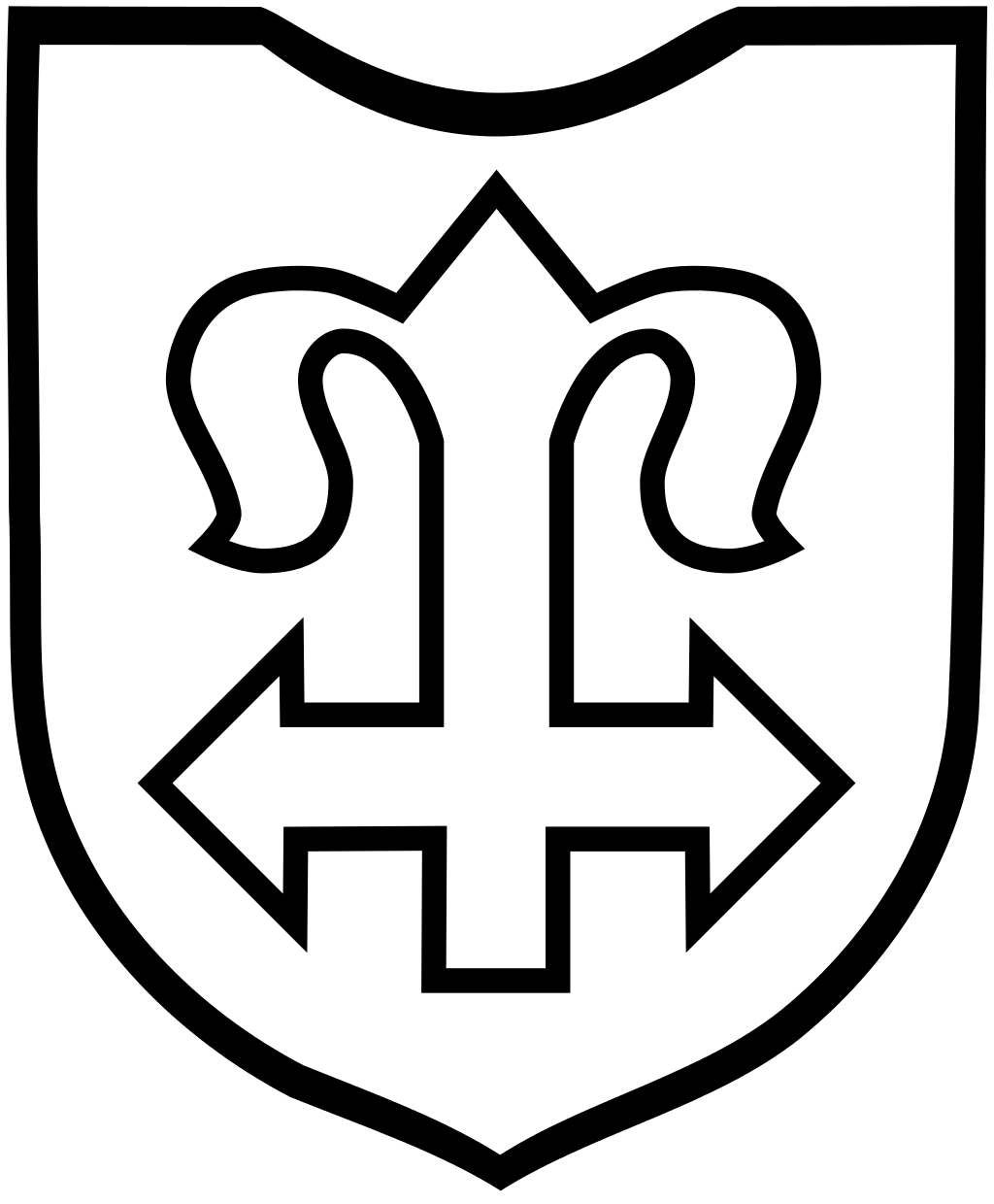
- Divisional symbol (Note: This symbol (exactly as depicted) is described by Keegan and Bishop as the divisional badge, and by Littlejohn as the "vehicle sign of the 24th Division".)
- Active: 18 July 1944 – 9 May 1945
- Country: Germany
- Branch: Waffen-SS
- Type: Mountain infantry
- Role: Anti-partisan operations
- Size: Division (never reached more than brigade size)
- Nickname(s): Karstjäger
- Engagements: World War II; Operation Dachstein

Insignia
- Identification symbol: Týr rune

The 24th Waffen Mountain Division of the SS Karstjäger was a German mountain infantry division of the Waffen-SS, the armed wing of the German Nazi Party that served alongside but was never formally part of the Wehrmacht during World War II. At the post-war Nuremberg trials, the Waffen-SS was declared to be a criminal organisation due to its major involvement in war crimes and crimes against humanity. Named Karstjäger ("Karst Hunter"), the formation was one of the 38 divisions fielded by the Waffen-SS. Formed on 18 July 1944 from the SS Volunteer Karstwehr Battalion, its nominal strength was never more than theoretical and the division was soon reduced to the Waffen Mountain (Karstjäger) Brigade of the SS. Throughout its existence as a battalion, division and brigade, it was primarily involved in fighting partisans in the Karst Plateau on the frontiers of Yugoslavia, Italy, and Austria; the mountainous terrain required specialised mountain troops and equipment.

Founded in 1942 as a company, the unit consisted mainly of Volksdeutsche (ethnic Germans/Austrians) from Yugoslavia and the South Tyrol province of Italy. Although focused on anti-partisan operations, it also saw action in the wake of the Italian surrender when it moved to disarm Italian troops in Tarvisio and protect ethnic German communities in Italy. In addition, at the end of the war it successfully fought to keep passes into Austria open, allowing German units to escape the Balkans and surrender to British forces. The remnants of the unit became some of the last Germans to lay down their arms when they surrendered to the British 6th Armoured Division on 9 May 1945. A joint Italian–German study implicated the division in 23 war crimes involving the killing of a total of 277 people in Italy between the Italian surrender and the end of the war.

== History ==
=== Origins ===
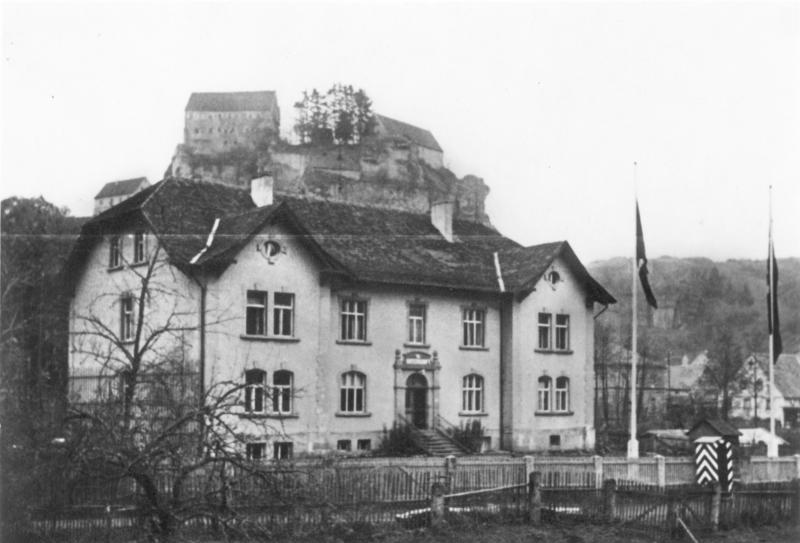
The training centre for the SS-Freiwilligen-Karstwehr Battalion was located in Pottenstein, Bavaria.

In mid-1942, the Waffen-SS formed a company intended for anti-partisan operations in the rugged and high-altitude border region between Italy, Austria and Yugoslavia known as the Karst. SS-Standartenführer (Colonel) Hans Brand, a geologist and speleologist, suggested the creation of the unit. The company was formed at the SS training centre in Dachau on 10 July 1942 from soldiers of the supply services training and replacement battalion of the 23rd Waffen Mountain Division of the SS Kama (2nd Croatian).

It was expanded to battalion strength of around 500 troops in November 1942, and as the SS-Freiwilligen-Karstwehr Battalion, it spent the first six months of 1943 training in Austria. The unit drew its recruits mainly from among the Germans of Yugoslavia (Volksdeutsche) and South Tyroleans, with the officer cadre being drawn from SS geological detachments. The battalion-strength Waffen-SS Geological Corps (German: SS-Wehrgeologenkorps), from which such detachments were drawn, was formed in April 1941 and consisted mainly of engineers with a few geologists. They examined caves and natural obstacles, and determined whether off-road terrain was suitable for tanks. They were also responsible for locating sources of fresh water. Following the Armistice of Cassibile in September 1943, the battalion was tasked with disarming Italian troops around Tarvisio on the border between the three countries. It then moved on to protective duties for nearby Volksdeutsche communities. From October 1943 until June 1944, the battalion was based at Gradisca d'Isonzo in Italy, and participated in anti-partisan operations in the areas of Trieste, Udine and the Istrian peninsula. On 10 October, a column of the battalion was ambushed at the Predil Pass, suffering three killed and eight wounded. The following day the battalion burned down the village of Strmec and killed 16 local men in retaliation. Up to 19 October 1943, the battalion suffered a total of 18 killed and 45 wounded in a series of engagements near the village of Bovec (Flitsch). During the same period, the battalion captured two Italian 75 mm mountain guns, which significantly increased its firepower.

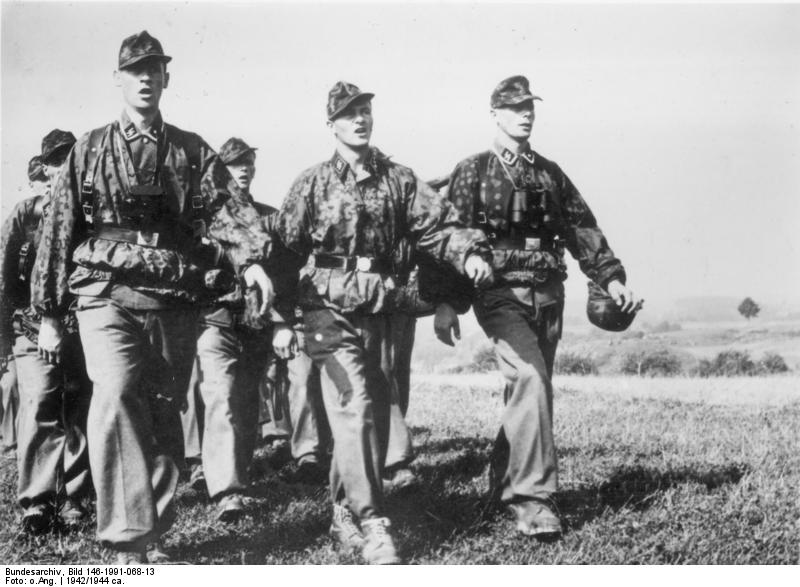
Men of the Karstwehr Battalion, 1942

During late October and November 1943, the battalion was engaged in anti-partisan operations around Žaga (Saga) and Kobarid (Karfreit), including Operation Traufe (Eaves). In late November, it was placed under the command of the Supreme SS and Police Leader, Italy, SS-Obergruppenführer und General der Waffen-SS (Lieutenant General) Karl Wolff for an operation. In February 1944, the battalion conducted Operation Ratte (Rat), during which it burned down the villages of Komen and Branik (Rihenberg), and interned the population of both villages in labour camps. Early in 1944, Brandt suggested that Slovene nationalists be recruited into the battalion, but the idea was rejected by SS headquarters who feared that such a policy would allow the infiltration of the unit by Yugoslav Partisans. At this stage, it was estimated that there were about 20,000 communist partisans operating in the Gorizia region. During March 1944, the battalion was involved in a rapid series of operations, including Zypresse (Cypress), Märzveilchen (Violet), Maulwurf (Mole) and Hellblau (Light Blue), resulting in significant guerrilla casualties, as well as executions of captured partisans. In March and April, Operation Osterglocke (Daffodil) was conducted over 12 days, followed by Operation Liane in late May, and the long-running Operation Annemarie which covered the period 7 May to 16 July 1944. In June 1944, a patrol from the battalion failed to return from a mission in the vicinity of Cividale del Friuli. Two days later, they were found naked with their severed heads impaled on bayonets. The unit became known for shooting suspected partisans. While engaged in anti-partisan work, the battalion grew to a strength of around 1,000.

=== Expansion ===
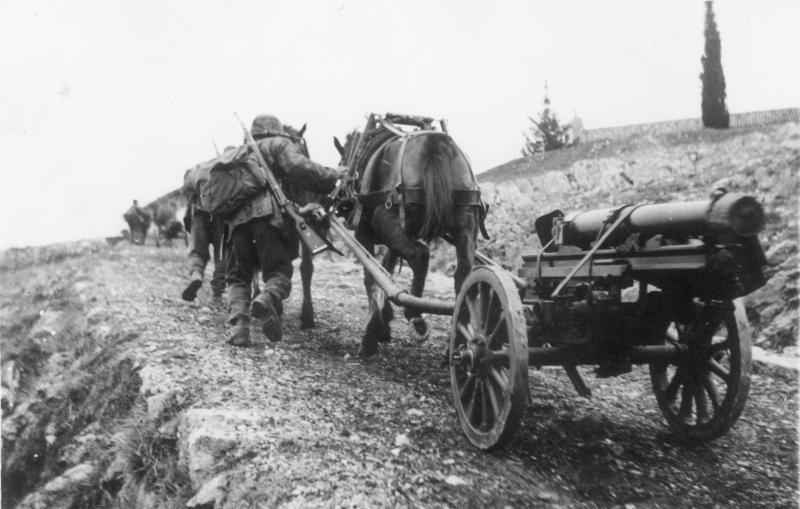
The SS-Freiwilligen-Karstwehr Battalion conducting artillery training

On 18 July 1944, Reichsführer-SS Heinrich Himmler ordered that the battalion be expanded to divisional size, although the authorised strength was only 6,600 troops. The 24th Waffen Mountain Division of the SS Karstjäger was to be established by the Higher SS and Police Leader (German: Höherer SS-und Polizeiführer) for the Operational Zone of the Adriatic Littoral, SS-Gruppenführer (Major General) Odilo Globocnik. The name Karstjäger was derived from a combination of Karst, denoting the region of operations, and Jäger, the German military term for light infantry. The division was to consist of two Gebirgsjäger (mountain infantry) regiments, with an artillery regiment, reconnaissance, Panzerjäger (anti-tank) and pioneer battalions, as well as replacement and supply troops. The division was supplied with 14 captured Italian Carro Armato P 40 tanks, but these proved unreliable, with only half being serviceable at any one time. In August 1944, the under-strength division participated in Operation Dachstein under the command of the 188th Mountain Division. Between August and November 1944, the division continued performing anti-partisan duties in the same region, but its strength had only reached 3,000, less than half of its authorised establishment. It proved impossible to recruit sufficient troops for the division, and in December 1944 the division was downgraded to a brigade.

During late 1944 and early 1945, the Waffen Mountain (Karstjäger) Brigade of the SS fought first against British-supported partisans in the Julian Alps, and was then deployed to the coastal area around Trieste and the Marano-Grado Lagoon. In danger of being cut off by Allied forces, the brigade soon returned to the Julian Alps, having to fight its way through the Tagliamento river valley between Osoppo and Gemona. Toward the end of April 1945, the brigade fought British and New Zealand forces on the southern fringe of the Julian Alps. The brigade replacement company, which had been sent to Cividale from its training centre at Pottenstein, Bavaria, managed to destroy a number of British tanks with panzerfausts and the assistance of a tank company. In the final weeks of the war the brigade was part of a Kampfgruppe (battlegroup) commanded by SS-Brigadeführer und Generalmajor der Waffen-SS (Brigadier) Heinz Harmel, which was ordered to keep the Karawanks passes open between Yugoslavia and Austria. This task was critical in allowing German forces to withdraw from Yugoslavia in order to surrender to British rather than Yugoslav forces. The Kampfgruppe succeeded in its final task, and was one of the last German units to surrender, when it encountered the British 6th Armoured Division on 9 May 1945.

The post-war Nuremberg trials made the declaratory judgement that the Waffen-SS was a criminal organisation due to its major involvement in war crimes and crimes against humanity, including the killing of prisoners-of-war and atrocities committed in occupied countries. Excluded from this judgement were those who were conscripted into the Waffen-SS and had not personally committed war crimes and crimes against humanity.

== War crimes ==
A joint Italian-German study implicated members of the division in 23 crimes involving the killing of 277 people in Italy between the Armistice of Cassibile and the end of World War II. The largest of these killings were:

- The Fosse del Natisone killings, which involved 113 people killed at the divisional barracks in Cividale del Friuli on unknown dates
- The killing of 27 people in the village of Malga Pramosio near Paluzza on 21 July 1944 in retaliation for Italian partisan attacks
- The killing of 33 people in the village of Torlano near Nimis on 25 August 1944 in retaliation for partisan attacks
- The killing of 21 male hostages between the towns of Terzo d'Aquileia and Cervignano del Friuli on 28/29 April 1945 in reprisal for partisan attacks
- The massacre of 51 people in the village of Avasinis near Trasaghis on 2 May 1945

== Order of battle ==
On paper, the division's final order of battle was to consist of:

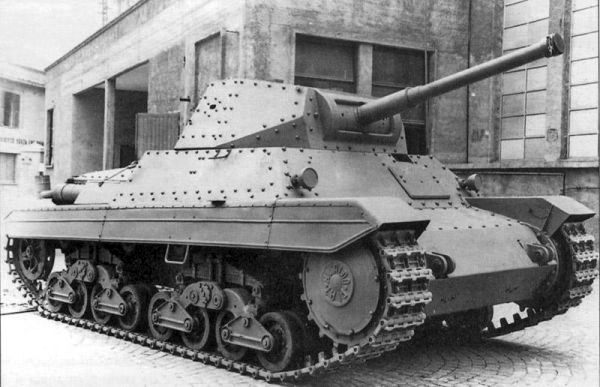
Fourteen captured Italian Carro Armato P 40 tanks were supplied to the newly formed division in July 1944, but they proved unreliable.

- 59th Waffen Gebirgsjäger (Mountain Infantry) Regiment of the SS (three battalions)
- 60th Waffen Gebirgsjäger Regiment of the SS (three battalions)
- 24th SS Mountain Artillery Regiment (four battalions)
- 24th SS Reconnaissance Battalion
- 24th SS Panzerjäger (Anti-tank) Battalion
- 24th SS Pioneer Battalion
- 24th SS Mountain Signals Battalion
- 24th SS Replacement Battalion

The division establishment also included supply units. However, only the 59th Waffen Gebirgsjäger Regiment, one battalion of the 24th SS Mountain Artillery Regiment, one company of the 24th SS Pioneer Battalion and a half-company of the divisional panzer company were ever established.

== Commanders ==
According to historian Gordon Williamson, three Waffen-SS officers commanded the division and subsequently the brigade:

- SS-Obersturmbannführer Karl Marx (December 1944)
- SS-Sturmbannführer Werner Hahn (December 1944 – February 1945)
- SS-Oberführer Adolf Wagner (February – May 1945)

In contrast, Roland Kaltenegger only lists Hahn as commanding the unit.

== Insignia and uniform ==
The divisional vehicle symbol was a stylised Týr rune with arrows pointing to the left and right. A collar insignia was manufactured, but it is believed that these were never issued or worn, and the members of the division wore the standard SS Sig runes.

== See also ==
- List of Waffen-SS units
- Ranks and insignia of the Waffen-SS
- Waffen-SS foreign volunteers and conscripts
