= Culminating point =

Part of military strategy

The culminating point in military strategy is the point at which a military force is no longer able to perform its operations.

On the offensive, the culminating point marks the time when the attacking force can no longer continue its advance, because of supply problems, the opposing force, or the need for rest. The task of the attacker is to complete its objectives before the culminating point is reached. The task of the defender on the other hand, is to bring the attacking force to its culminating point before its objectives are completed.

The concept of a culminating point (Kulminationspunkt) was formulated by the Prussian general and military theorist Carl von Clausewitz in his book On War published in 1832 (Book 7, Chapter 5).

== See also ==
- Momentum
- Defence in depth
- Loss-of-strength gradient
- Strategic depth
