= Loss-of-strength gradient =

Military concept

The loss-of-strength gradient (LSG) is a military concept devised by Kenneth E. Boulding in his 1962 book Conflict and Defense: A General Theory. He argued the amount of a nation's military power that could be brought to bear in any part of the world depended on geographic distance. The loss of strength gradient demonstrated graphically that, the further away the target of aggression, the less strength could be made available. It also showed how this loss of strength could be ameliorated by forward positions.

== Decreasing relevance ==
Boulding also argued that the loss-of-strength gradient was becoming less relevant in modern warfare due to easier transportation and the rise of strategic air and missile power. He claimed that a 20th-century "military revolution" allowed for a "substantial diminution in the cost of transportation of organized violence of all kinds, especially of organized armed forces", as well as "an enormous increase in the range of the deadly projectile."

On the other hand, another scholar contended that the loss-of-strength gradient remains relevant, and if there has been a reduction in the concept's significance, it was only temporary, as transportation is not becoming permanently easy, and air power is not replacing the need for forward deployed ground forces.

== See also ==
- Blue-water navy
- Culminating point
- Defence in depth
- Expeditionary warfare
- Power projection
- Strategic depth
