= Defence-in-depth (Roman military) =

Term coined to describe the defensive strategy of the ancient Roman army

Defence-in-depth is the term used by American political analyst Edward Luttwak (born 1942) to describe his theory of the defensive strategy employed by the Late Roman army in the third and fourth centuries AD.

Luttwak's Grand Strategy of the Roman Empire (1976) launched the thesis that in the third and early fourth centuries, the Imperial Roman army's defence strategy mutated from "forward defence" (or "preclusive defence") during the Principate era (30 BC-AD 284) to "defence-in-depth" in the fourth century. "Forward-" or "preclusive" defence aimed to neutralise external threats before they breached the Roman borders: the barbarian regions neighbouring the borders were envisaged as the theatres of operations. In contrast, "defence-in-depth" would not attempt to prevent incursions into Roman territory, but aimed to neutralise them on Roman soil - in effect turning border provinces into combat zones.

Scholarly opinion generally accepts "forward-defence" as a valid description of the Roman Empire's defensive posture during the Principate. But many specialists in Roman military history (which Luttwak is not) contest that this posture changed to Luttwak's "defence-in-depth" from 284 onwards. Described as "manifestly wrong" by the expert on Roman borders, C. R. Whittaker, "defence-in-depth" has been criticised as incompatible with fourth-century Roman imperialist ideology (which remained expansionist), Roman strategic planning capabilities, with the evidence of fourth-century Roman historian Ammianus Marcellinus and with the vast corpus of excavation evidence from the Roman border regions.

== Thesis ==
According to this view, the Imperial Roman army had relied on neutralizing imminent barbarian incursions before they reached the imperial borders. This was achieved by stationing units (both legions and auxilia) right on the border and establishing and garrisoning strategic salients beyond the borders (such as the Agri Decumates in SW Germany). The response to any threat would thus be a pincer movement into barbarian territory: large infantry and cavalry forces from the border bases would immediately cross the border to intercept the coalescing enemy army; simultaneously the enemy would be attacked from behind by crack Roman cavalry (alae) advancing from the strategic salient(s). This system obviously required first-rate intelligence of events in the barbarian borderlands, which was provided by a system of watch towers in the strategic salients and by continuous cross-border scouting operations (explorationes).

According to Luttwak, the forward defence system was always vulnerable to unusually large barbarian concentrations of forces, as the Roman army was too thinly spread along the enormous borders to deal with such threats. In addition, the lack of any reserves to the rear of the border meant that a barbarian force that successfully penetrated the perimeter defenses would have unchallenged ability to rampage deep into the empire before Roman reinforcements could arrive to intercept them. The first major challenge to forward defense was the great invasion of Germanic tribes (esp. Quadi and Marcomanni) across the Danube in 166–7, which began the Marcomannic Wars. The barbarians reached as far as Aquileia in northeastern Italy and were not finally expelled from the empire until 175. But the response of the imperial high command was not to change the forward defence strategy, but to reinforce it (by the founding of 2 new legions under Marcus Aurelius and 3 more under Septimius Severus and probably matching auxiliary forces). It was only after the catastrophic military crises of 251-71 that the Roman command under Diocletian turned to defence-in-depth: but only out of necessity, not conviction, as there were attempts to return to forward defence as late as Valentinian I (ruled 364–75) Forward defence had become simply too costly to maintain, especially with the emergence of a more powerful and expansionist Persian empire (the Sassanids) which required greater deployments in the East.

The essential feature of defence-in-depth, according to Luttwak, was the acceptance that the Roman frontier provinces themselves would become the main combat zone in operations against barbarian threats, rather than the barbarian lands across the border. Under this strategy, border forces would not attempt to repel a large incursion. Instead, they would retreat into fortified strongholds and wait for mobile forces (comitatenses) to arrive and intercept the invaders. Border forces would be substantially weaker than under forward defence, but their reduction in numbers (and quality) would be compensated by the establishment of much stronger fortifications to protect themselves: hence the abandonment of the old "playing-card" rectangular design of Roman fort. The new forts were so designed that they could only be taken with the use of siege engines (which barbarians generally lacked): square or even circular layout, much higher and thicker walls, wider perimeter berms and deeper ditches; projecting towers to allow enfilading fire; and location in more defensible points, such as hilltops. At the same time, many more small forts were established in the hinterland, especially along roads, to impose delays on the invaders. Also, fortified granaries were built to store food safely and deny supplies to the invaders. Finally, the civilian population of the province was protected by providing walls for all towns, many villages and even some villas (large country houses); some pre-Roman hillforts, long since abandoned, were re-occupied in the form of new Roman walled settlements. The invading force would thus find itself in a region peppered with strongholds in enemy hands and where it could not easily get access to sufficient supplies. If the invaders ignored the strongholds and advanced, they risked sorties and attacks in the rear. If they attempted to besiege the strongholds, they would give the mobile troops valuable time to arrive. Overall, the aim of defence-in-depth was to provide an effective defence system at a sustainable cost, since defence-in-depth required much lower troop deployments than forward defence. To be more precise, the cost was transferred from general taxpayers to the people of the frontier provinces, especially the rural peasantry, who, for all the fortifications, would often see their family members killed or abducted, homes destroyed, livestock seized and crops burnt by marauding barbarians.

== Critique ==
Luttwak's work has been praised for its lucid analysis of, and insights into, issues regarding Roman military dispositions, and for stimulating much scholarly debate about these issues. But the validity of his basic thesis has been strongly disputed by a number of scholars, especially in a powerful critique by B. Isaac, the author of the fundamental study of the Roman army in the East (1992). The objections fall under two broad headings: (1) The Roman empire did not have the intelligence and planning capacity to sustain a "grand strategy" and in any case was not defensive in ideology or policy.(2) Defence-in-depth is not, in the main, consistent with the literary and archaeological evidence.

=== Strategic planning ===
Luttwak's thesis of an imperial grand strategy rests on a number of assumptions: (a) that the empire's strategic posture was basically defensive; (b) that Roman expansion and choice of borders were systematic and rational, with the main objective of securing defensible borders; (c) that the Roman government's primary concern was to ensure the security of its provincial subjects. But Isaac demonstrates that these assumptions are probably false and result from inappropriate application of modern concepts of international relations and military strategy to the ancient world. Isaac suggests that the empire was fundamentally aggressive both in ideology and military posture, up to and including the fourth century. This was demonstrated by the continued military operations and siting of fortifications well beyond the imperial borders. The empire's expansion was determined mostly by the ambitions of emperors; and that the choice of borders, to the extent that they were planned at all, was more influenced by logistical considerations (e.g. rivers, that were critical conduits for supplies) rather than defensibility. Finally, the imperial government probably was far less concerned with the security of its subjects than would be a modern government. Isaac shows that the empire did not develop the centralised military planning, or even accurate enough cartography, necessary to support grand strategy. Rome did not develop the equivalent of the centralised general staff of a modern army (and even less strategic studies institutes of the kind frequented by Luttwak). Emperors depended on the theatre military commanders (the provincial governors, later the magistri militum and duces) for all military intelligence.

=== Archaeological evidence ===
There is also little unequivocal archaeological and literary evidence to support defence-in-depth. Luttwak's defence-in-depth hypothesis appears to rely on two basic features: (a) deepened fortified border zones: "It became necessary to build forts capable of sustained resistance, and these fortifications had to be built in depth, in order to protect internal lines of communication. Instead of a thin perimeter line on the edges of provincial territory, broad zones of military control had to be created..." "The thin line of auxiliary 'forts' and legionary 'fortresses' was gradually replaced by a much broader network of small fortified hard-points (in the hands of) scattered groups of static limitanei..." The hypothesis thus predicts the establishment of fortifications well into the interior of border provinces, rather than just a string of bases right on the border line; (b) the use of the comitatus praesentales (imperial escort armies) as interception forces to deal with incursions. Luttwak terminates his analysis in 350, before the establishment of the regional comitatus. The interception forces were thus the single large comitatus of Constantine, and, later, the 3 comitatus known from Ammianus to exist in 350 of Gaul, Illyricum and the East. But there are serious difficulties with both propositions.

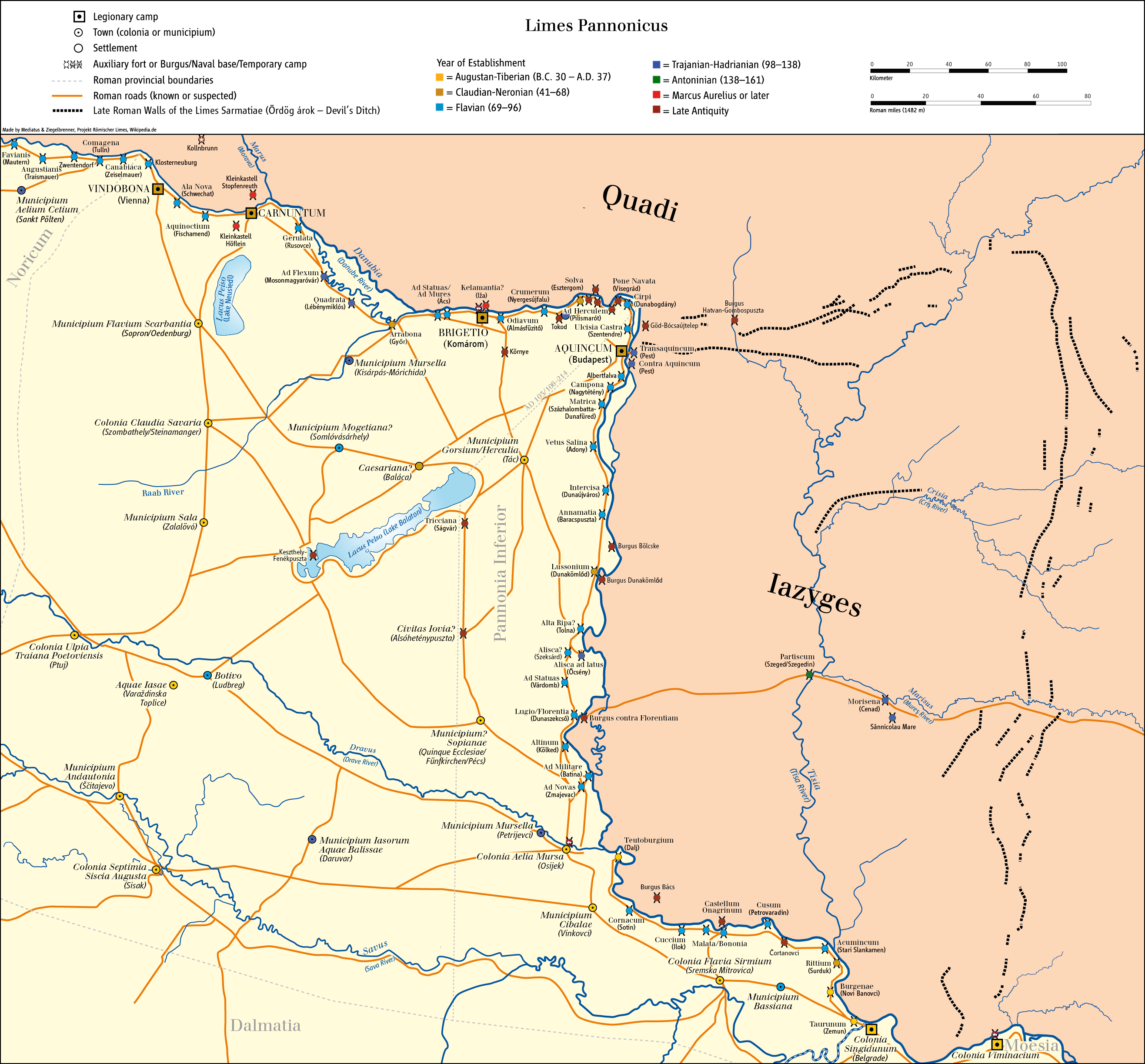
Map showing location of Roman forts along the river Danube in Pannonia. Note that forts built in fourth century (dark red) are all either on, or even beyond, the Danube, and none in the hinterland, contradicting defence-in-depth. Also note the so-called "Devil's Dyke" or Limes Sarmatiae earthen fortifications, on the fringes of the Hungarian Plain. These works, built in the time of Constantine I (r. 312–337), may have been jointly manned by Roman troops and Iazyges natives, and were probably designed to protect the Plain from incursions by marauding Germanic tribes: a clear element of forward defence in the late period

(a) J.C. Mann points out that there is no evidence, either in the Notitia Dignitatum or in the archaeological record, that units along the Rhine or Danube were stationed in the border hinterlands. On the contrary, virtually all forts identified as built or occupied in the fourth century on the Danube lay on, very near or even beyond the river, strikingly similar to the second-century distribution.

Luttwak seizes on the situation in Palaestina Salutaris (mainly the former Arabia Petraea) province, which was dotted with forts all over, as an example of defence-in-depth. But here it cannot be proven that the defence system developed only in the fourth century. It may have dated from as early as the second century. In any case, Isaac shows that these "in-depth" forts were probably used for the purposes of internal security against rebels and brigands rather than defence against external threat. Indeed, such material as can be dated to Diocletian suggests that his reorganisation resulted in a massive reinforcement of linear defence along his newly built desert highway, the Strata Diocletiana.

In Britain, the configuration of a large number of fourth-century units stationed between Hadrian's Wall and the legionary fortresses at Deva (Chester) and Eboracum (York), superficially resembles defence-in-depth. But the same configuration existed in the second century, and was due to the short length of the frontier, forcing a "vertical" rather than horizontal deployment, as well as the need to protect the coastlines from seaborne attack. It was not defence-in-depth in the Luttwak sense.

So strong is the evidence for forward defence under Diocletian that Luttwak himself struggles to avoid that conclusion. At one point, he describes it as "shallow defence-in-depth", a contradiction in terms. At another, he admits that Diocletian's policy was a "sustained attempt to provide a preclusive (i.e. forward) defence of the imperial territory". Indeed, the unfavourable evidence forces Luttwak to adopt a self-contradicting thesis. While claiming that the basic strategy of the fourth century was defence-in-depth, he admits that there were repeated attempts by the stronger emperors (up to and including Valentinian I) to revert to forward defence. This obviously casts doubt on whether a defence-in-depth strategy was ever contemplated or implemented in reality.

The Romans continued to assist the client tribes to defend themselves in the fourth century e.g. the construction by Constantine's army of two massive lines of defensive earthworks (the Devil's Dykes in Hungary and the Brazda lui Novac de Nord in Romania) well beyond the Danube (100–200 miles forward) to protect the client tribes of the Banat and the Wallachian plain against Gothic incursions. This system of a series of buffer zones of "client tribes" clearly represents an efficient and economical form of "forward defence". It contradicts the proposition that the border provinces of the empire were themselves envisaged as buffer zones.

Gang Hao Poh describes a 'mosaic' of locally adapted systems: (i) river‑edge forts and bridgeheads on the Rhine and Danube that were rebuilt and enlarged, not vacated; (ii) a line of compact "inner fortresses", rearward bases strategically situated along the main roads leading to the frontiers, placed only a day's march behind the Middle Danube to safeguard granaries and road junctions; and (iii) major forward complexes such as Iatrus and Nicopolis ad Istrum, where Constantinian-era works added U‑shaped towers, workshops and new river ports. Another common feature in the late Roman Empire's Arabian peripherpy was the strategic control of local water sources. Deir al-Kahf, in particular, was the operating base for a unit of cavalry to patrol the desert route and the oasis. Likewise, the "legionary fortress of El-Lejjun also controlled the few springs of the Karak plateau, 250m northeast of the base." By maintaining control over these key water sources, the Romans ensured a steady supply of fresh water for the local garrisons while depriving hostile forces, mainly nomadic raiders, of a water source. Poh concludes that late‑Roman strategy aimed to meet threats at the frontier by tailoring forts, fleets, road hubs and defence strategies to local terrain, rather than applying a uniform empire‑wide 'defence‑in‑depth'.

=== Literary evidence ===
In the absence of any evidence of "defensive depth" in the stationing of border forces, the only "depth" left were the comitatus praesentales (imperial escort armies) stationed in the interior of the empire. But Luttwak himself admits that these were too distant from the frontier to be of much value in intercepting barbarian incursions: their arrival in theatre could take weeks, if not months. Although they are often described as "mobile field armies", in this context "immobile" would be a more accurate description. Luttwak terminates his analysis in mid-fourth century, just before the establishment of the regional comitatus. But the positioning of the latter, right on the borders or within 60 miles (100 km) of them, seems strikingly similar to that of the legions in the second century. It could be argued that the deployment of the regional comitatus was simply an admission that Zosimus' criticism of Constantine's policy was valid and that effective forward defence required reinforcement of the limitanei troops.

A further powerful objection to defence-in-depth is that it is clear from Ammianus that Rome continued major offensive operations across the imperial borders in the fourth century. These were strikingly similar to the pincer movements described by Luttwak as being characteristic of forward defence in the early Principate. For example, Valentinian I's campaign against the Quadi in 375. The barbarian tribe that were the target of the operation rarely resisted the Romans in pitched battle and more often took refuge in forests and hills. The Romans would then systematically ravage their crops and burn their hamlets until starvation forced the barbarians to surrender. They would then be forced to conclude treaties of alliance with the Romans, often involving the client status described below. But there was no aspect of this activity that was peculiar to the fourth century.

One "defence strategy" the empire certainly employed was a system of treaties of mutual assistance with tribes living on the imperial frontiers, but this was not unique to the fourth century, but a long-standing practice dating to the days of the late Republic. The Romans would promise to defend the ally from attack by its neighbours. In return, the ally would promise to refrain from raiding imperial territory, and prevent neighbouring tribes from doing the same. In many cases, the loyalty of the ally would need to be further secured by gifts or regular subsidies. In some cases, the Romans would assume a loose suzerainty over the tribe, in effect dictating the choice of new chiefs. This practice was applied on all the frontiers: Germans along the Rhine, Sarmatians along the Danube, Armenian kings and Caucasian and Saracen tribes on the Eastern frontier and Mauri in North Africa. On the desert frontier of Syria, the Romans would appoint a Saracen sheikh (called a phylarchos in Greek), according him an official rank in the Roman hierarchy, to "shadow" each dux limitis in the sector. In return for food subsidies, the phylarchs would defend the desert frontier against raiders.

== State of the debate ==
As regards imperial ideology and central defence planning, Adrian Goldsworthy argues that both sides of the debate, which continues vigorously, have made valid points. Some degree of central planning is implied by the disposition, frequently altered, of legions and auxiliary forces in the various provinces. In addition, although the empire's ideology may have been offensive in nature, border fortification such as Hadrian's Wall was clearly defensive. It is a fact that the empire ceased to expand its territory after the rule of emperor Trajan (98-117). Thereafter, the borders remained largely static, with indeed a few losses of territory: the immediate evacuation of Trajan's conquests in Mesopotamia by his successor Hadrian (r. 117–38) and of the Agri Decumates in Germany and of Dacia in the third century. Thus, even if the empire's ideology and propaganda was expansionist (the slogan imperium sine fine- "empire without limits" - was common), its policy was in reality generally non-expansionist.

As regards Luttwak's defence-in-depth theory itself, there appears to be insufficient clearcut evidence to support it and massive evidence against it. Mann's critique was written in 1979, so does not take account of the substantial corpus of archaeological data accumulated since. But the latter overwhelmingly contradicts a defence-in-depth strategy. Virtually all identified forts built in the fourth century lay on, very near or even beyond the border. Some evidence of fortifications in the hinterland has come to light that could be consistent with defence-in-depth. But such features cannot be unequivocally linked with military units. Furthermore, the fourth-century army's "defence" posture shares many features with the earlier forward-defence policy. The undoubted enhanced fortification of forts and other buildings, as well as cities in the border provinces (and deep in the interior of the empire including Rome itself) may therefore be interpreted as simply an admission that forward defence was not working as well as in the earlier centuries. Either barbarian pressure was much greater and/or the Roman border forces were less effective than before in containing it.

== See also ==
- Edward Luttwak
- Defence in depth (military)
- Defence in depth (non-military)
- Defense in depth (nuclear engineering)
- Late Roman army
