= Strategic depth =

Military term: Distance between Front lines and Key assets

Strategic depth is a term in military literature that broadly refers to the distances between the front lines or battle sectors and the combatant's industrial core areas, capital cities, heartlands, and other key centers of population or military production.

== Concept ==
The key precepts any military commander must consider when dealing with strategic depth are how vulnerable these assets are to a quick, preemptive attack or to a methodical offensive and whether a country can withdraw into its own territory, absorb an initial thrust, and allow the subsequent offensive to culminate short of its goal and far from its source of power.

Commanders must be able to plan for both eventualities and have measures and resources in place on both tactical and strategic levels to counter any stages of a minor or major enemy attack. The measures do not need to be limited to purely military assets since the ability to reinforce civilian infrastructure or make it flexible enough to withstand or evade assault is very useful in times of war. The issue was the tradeoff between space and time as witnessed by Germany’s failure to defeat the Soviet Union in 1942. In the face of a German invasion, the Soviet military retreated from occupied Poland in June 1941 to the outskirts of Moscow in December 1941, which allowed the Soviet Union to move its industrial base to the east of the Ural Mountains. Thus, the industries that had been moved were able to produce the resources that were needed for the Soviet counterattack.

== In reference to Pakistan ==
In Pakistan, the idea of strategic depth was perceived in the 1980s by the National Defence University, Pakistan, Professor General Mirza Aslam Beg (later Chief of Army Staff working under Prime Minister Benazir Bhutto in the 1980s). Since then, the Pakistan military establishment has been repeatedly accused of forming a policy that seeks to control Afghanistan, a policy often referred to by the media as "strategic depth", which is used as the reason for Pakistan's support of certain factions of the Taliban in Afghanistan. In the years 2014–2015, with Pakistan's domestic operation against militants in full swing, Pakistani military leaders said that they adhered to no such policy.

=== Accusations against the Pakistan military ===
The term "strategic depth" has been used in reference to Pakistan's utilization and contact with Afghanistan following the neighboring country's Soviet intervention, to prevent encirclement from a hostile India and a USSR-supported Afghanistan. Some sources state that the policy to control Afghanistan was formulated by NDU professor, General Mirza Aslam Beg, and an Indian source claims this was continued as an active policy by the Pakistan Armed Forces until the policy was "de jure abolished in 1998 and de facto abolished in 2001", a period when General Pervez Musharraf was the Chairman Joint chiefs.

According to Richard Olson, U.S. Ambassador to Pakistan, Pakistan military's doctrine of "strategic depth" is a concept in which Pakistan uses Afghanistan as an instrument of strategic security in ongoing tensions with India by attempting to control Afghanistan as a pawn for its own political purposes.

It has been speculated that the Pakistan's military "strategic depth" policy is either military or non-military in nature. The military version would state that the Pakistan military wishes to use Afghan territory as a "strategic rallying point" where they can, in the event of a successful Indian attack, retreat to and re-group for a counter-attack. The non-military version would be based on the idea that Pakistan can improve relations with other Islamic countries and former Soviet states such as Uzbekistan and Kazakhstan, developing improved economic and cultural ties with them and thus making them into strong allies against India.

=== View of the Pakistan military ===
The former Chief of Army staff General Ashfaq Kayani, and previously the director-general of the ISI, has repeatedly stated to the media that the Pakistan armed force's "strategic depth" policy with regards to Afghanistan is not to "control" Afghanistan but to ensure a "peaceful, friendly and stable" relationship with Afghanistan. This policy therefore aims to ensure that Pakistan will not be threatened with long-term security problems on its Western border with Afghanistan. According to Kayani, a 'talibanised' Afghanistan is not in Pakistan's interests.

According to Ejaz Haider, a Pakistani military journalist, there is a confusion in the media regarding the policy on using Afghan territory to as a fallback area for Pakistan military assets. Haider blames General Mirza Aslam Beg for proposing this when he was the chief of army staff of the Pakistan Army under Prime Minister Benazir Bhutto, stating that this concept "was unpopular even when he was the chief and it has never been entertained by serious military planners. No one thinks of placing military and other assets in Afghanistan and thus acquiring strategic depth." Haider states that such a concept has always been impossible "for a host of reasons" and strategic depth is better used to describe achieving security through improving relationships with the governments of neighbouring countries such as Afghanistan and India.

Lieutenant-General Asad Durrani of ISI, has rubbished claims in the media regarding Pakistan intending to use Afghan territory as "strategic depth". He also denies accusations that the Pakistan military has tried to "install a friendly government in Kabul" to "secure this depth". He gives the Soviet Union as an example, stating that "after the Saur Revolution, the Soviets executed and installed a president every three months in pursuit of that objective" and these policies later resulted in the defeat of the Soviets in Afghanistan. He argues that the notion of Pakistan using Afghan territory for its own purposes is a "distortion of a concept or of history" and is being used to vilify Pakistan.

== In China ==
During the Cold War, Mao Zedong's Third Front campaign to increase the strategic depth of the People's Republic of China (PRC) by locating critical infrastructure and national defense facilities in the interior of the country and away from areas where they would be vulnerable to Soviet invasion or U.S. air attacks. PRC military analysts view control over Taiwan as allowing the country to break out of the first island chain and increase its strategic depth.

== In Israel ==
Israel is a narrow country, and its internationally recognized borders leave it just 85 miles (137 km) across at its widest point and 9 miles (14 km) at its narrowest (between Tulkarm and Tel Aviv). A number of Israeli leaders (originally Abba Eban) have referred to Israel's internationally recognized borders (those the country had from 1948 to 1967) as the "Auschwitz borders" because of the perceived danger of annihilation by regional foes. Since 1967, Israel has occupied the West Bank, somewhat widening the area under the military's effective control.

To compensate for the lack of strategic depth, Israel puts a great importance on deterrence (partially by threat of nuclear weapons), superior firepower, and the use of pre-emptive war to prevent threats from encroaching on Israeli territory. Yitzhak Rabin said about the Six-Day War (considered a classic example of pre-emption):

The basic philosophy of Israel was not to initiate war, unless an active war was carried out against us. We then lived within the lines before the Six-Day War, lines that gave no depth to Israel—and therefore, Israel was in need, whenever there would be a war, to go immediately on the offensive—to carry the war to the enemy's land.

Israeli leaders consider the issue of strategic depth to be important in negotiating its final borders as part of the Israeli–Palestinian peace process. Issues of contention include the West Bank settlements and potential Israeli control of the Jordan Valley after the creation of a Palestinian state.

== In Turkey ==
Former Turkish Prime Minister Ahmet Davutoğlu's strategic depth doctrine, articulated in his 2001 book Strategic Depth: Turkey's International Position, became a central framework of Turkish foreign policy following the Justice and Development Party's (AKP) rise to power in 2002. Drawing upon Turkey's geographical position and Ottoman historical inheritance, Davutoğlu advocated transforming Turkey into a regional and global power exercising influence across the Balkans, Caucasus, Middle East, and Central Asia. The doctrine emphasized diplomacy, economic interdependence, cultural influence, encouraging regional integration through trade agreements, and investment. Under the AKP, Turkey substantially expanded its regional economic relationships, with trade between Turkey and the Middle East increasing from $5.7 billion in 2002 to $57.7 billion in 2013.

Scholars have interpreted the doctrine as an ideological and geopolitical framework facilitating the international expansion of Turkish capital and consolidating the domestic influence of business interests associated with the AKP. This has sometimes been called "Neo-Ottomanism".

Political scientist Faruk Yalvaç criticized Turkey's state-centred geopolitical assumptions for obscuring the underlying social and class relations shaping Turkish foreign policy, proposing the alternative concept of "hegemonic depth". Beyza Tekin and R. Barış Tekin argue that Turkey's commercial diplomacy was driven partly by the structural weaknesses of its neoliberal economic model, particularly its dependence on foreign capital, imported energy, and intermediate goods, while the pursuit of export markets substituted for deeper industrial transformation. Mehmet Sinan Birdal similarly examines the doctrine as part of the AKP's populist construction of national identity and political legitimacy. Ertan Erol characterizes Turkey's regional ambitions as those of a capitalist power seeking greater influence while remaining structurally constrained by its subordinate position within the global economy, attributing the subsequent erosion of Turkish regional influence to decades of neoliberal restructuring.

== See also ==
- Culminating point
- Defence in depth
- Loss of Strength Gradient
- Military strategy
- Soviet deep battle
- Strategic defence
- Attacks in Russia during the Russo-Ukrainian war (2022–present)
