= Defence in depth =

Military strategy

Defence in depth (also known as deep defence or elastic defence) is a military strategy that seeks to delay rather than prevent the advance of an attacker, buying time and causing additional casualties by yielding space. Rather than defeating an attacker with a single, strong defensive line, defence in depth relies on the tendency of an attack to lose momentum over time or as it covers a larger area. A defender can thus yield lightly defended territory in an effort to stress an attacker's logistics or spread out a numerically superior attacking force. Once an attacker has lost momentum or is forced to spread out to pacify a large area, defensive counter-attacks can be mounted on the attacker's weak points, with the goal being to cause attrition or drive the attacker back to its original starting position.

== Strategy ==
A conventional defence strategy would concentrate all military resources at a front line, which, if breached by an attacker, would leave the remaining defenders in danger of being outflanked and surrounded and would leave supply lines, communications, and command vulnerable.

Defence in depth requires that a defender deploy their resources, such as fortifications, field works and military units at and well behind the front line. Although attackers may find it easier to breach the more weakly defended front line, as they advance, they continue to meet resistance. As they penetrate deeper, their flanks become vulnerable, and, should the advance stall, they risk being enveloped.

The defence in depth strategy is particularly effective against attackers who are able to concentrate their forces and attack a small number of places on an extended defensive line.

Defenders that can fall back to a succession of prepared positions can exact a high price from the advancing enemy while themselves avoiding the danger of being overrun or outflanked. Delaying the enemy advance mitigates the attacker's advantage of surprise and allows time to move defending units to make a defence and to prepare a counter-attack.

A well-planned defence in depth strategy will deploy forces in mutually supportive positions and in appropriate roles. For example, poorly trained troops may be deployed in static defences at the front line, whereas better trained and equipped troops form a mobile reserve. Successive layers of defence may use different technologies against various targets; for example, dragon's teeth might present a challenge for tanks but is easily circumvented by infantry, while another barrier of wire entanglements has the opposite effects on the respective forces. Defence in depth may allow a defender to maximise the defensive possibilities of natural terrain and other advantages.

The disadvantages of defence in depth are that it may be unacceptable for a defender to plan to give ground to an attacker. This may be because vital military or economic resources are close to the front line or because yielding to an enemy is unacceptable for political or cultural reasons. In addition, the continuous retreats that are required by defence in depth require the defender to have a high degree of mobility in order to retreat successfully, and they assume that the defender's morale will recover from the retreat.

== Examples ==
A possible early example of this came at the Battle of Cannae in 216 BC, when Hannibal employed this manoeuvre in order to encircle and destroy eight Roman legions, but that is disputed by some historians.

Edward Luttwak used the term to describe his theory of the defensive strategy employed by the Late Roman army in the 3rd and 4th centuries AD.

Later examples of defence in depth might be European hill forts and the development of concentric castles. These castles utilized many layers, including ditches, outer walls, towers, inner walls, and a keep, with some layers like the outer ditch intended to only slow attackers and reduce their coordination. In those examples, the inner layers of defence can support the outer layers with projectile fire and an attacker must breach each line of defence in turn with the prospect of significant losses, and the defenders have the option of falling back to fight again. On a strategic level, defence in depth was employed by the Byzantine military.

In the American Revolutionary War's Battle of Cowpens, the American forces were positioned in three lines which soaked up the shock of the British charge and inflicted heavy casualties before the Americans were able to overrun the British who, at this point, had lost their cohesion.

More recent examples of defence in depth include the multiple lines of trenches of the First World War and the following Turkish War of Independence where the Turks stopped the advance of the Greeks towards Ankara. Also plans for the defence of Britain against a potential German invasion in the Second World War. During the Battle of Normandy, Wehrmacht forces utilized the bocage of the area, flooding of fields, and strategic placement of defences to create successive lines of defences to slow the attacking Allies in hopes that reinforcements would arrive.

The Pacific Theatre also had many examples of defence in depth, with the Japanese inflicting heavy casualties on the Americans in the Battles of Tarawa, Saipan, Peleliu, Iwo Jima, and Okinawa.

China's Third Front campaign was a series of projects to ensure the country's defence in depth.

The best modern example of a successful defence in depth is that of the Battle of Kursk in the Second World War. During the battle, the Red Army deliberately drew the Germans into an attritional battle in multiple, well-prepared defensive lines, before launching massive counter-attacks on either side of the 9th Army in the north and the 4th Panzer Army in the south. The initial German offensive never fully penetrated the Red Army lines. By contrast, the subsequent Red Army counter-offensive pushed the front line hundreds of miles westwards.

Colonel Francis J. Kelly discussed the employment of defence in depth in Army Special Forces camps during the Vietnam War. Kelly, a former U.S. Army Special Forces commander and author of Vietnam Studies U.S. Army Special Forces 1961–1971, stated in his work that the austere Special Forces fighting camps were highly functional and easily defended.

While untested, this was also the planned NATO strategy in Europe during the Cold War at the Fulda Gap. However, by the 1980s, West Germany eventually pressured NATO to abandon this orthodox doctrine as it would have entailed allowing the country to be overrun by Warsaw Pact forces before they would be finally stopped. Instead, NATO agreed to an alternative doctrine of "Forward defence," which was criticized for not only being militarily senseless because it would have quickly forced NATO to resort to tactical nuclear weapons when the Warsaw Pact broke through with their considerable conventional forces, but also because the enemy considered the doctrine so provocative and potentially aggressive that striking first seemed a viable option as a result.

== Application to other fields ==
The concept of defence-in-depth (DiD) is also applied in the fields of life-threatening technologies where it is critical to avoid a disaster, or to save lives.

The safety of nuclear reactors and radioactive waste repositories also fundamentally relies on multiple systems and redundant barriers. The principle of redundancy is essential to prevent the occurrence of dramatic failures and in case where a failure would develop to retard the progression of a potentially disastrous event and to give extra time for taking again the control of the failed system. Ultimately, if a failure cannot be avoided, DiD also contributes to mitigate the consequences and to attenuate the negative impacts of the failure.

Defence-in-depth is required to guarantee the robustness of vital systems, e.g. in nuclear technologies and for aerospace systems where safety is critical. The DiD approach can be applied to any sensitive technology: submarines and naval systems, biotechnology, pharmaceutic industry, informatics, bank and financial systems, etc.

In nature, the immune system of most evolved organisms also appeals to multiple lines of defence in case a pathogen would defeat the first line of defence of cells, tissues and organs.

The robustness of the scientific method also relies on multiple lines of evidence and multiple lines of reasoning: strong claims require strong and multiple evidence. The repeatability and the reproducibility of experimental and calculations results are essential to guarantee their robustness and correctness. This associated with the scientific questioning and a constant interrogative attitude is at the core of the self-correcting process guiding the science.

Academics from Oxford University's Future of Humanity Institute also applied the concept of defence in depth to designing strategies for the prevention of existential catastrophes, especially those involving human extinction.

== See also ==
- Bandwagoning
- Culminating point
- Deep operation
- Defence in depth (non-military)
- Defense in depth (nuclear engineering)
- Defence-in-depth (Roman military)
- Hedgehog defence
- List of military tactics
- Loss of Strength Gradient
- Scorched earth
- Strategic depth
