= Fukushima nuclear accident (Unit 3 Reactor) =

One of the reactors involved in the Fukushima nuclear accident

Fukushima Daiichi (Unit 3 Reactor)
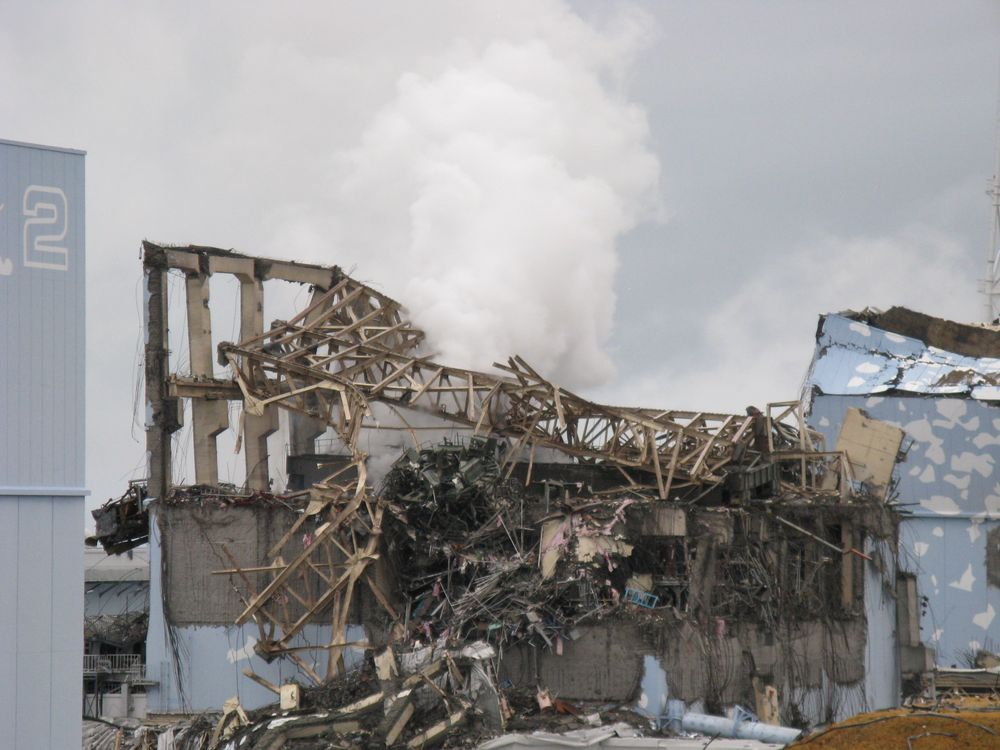
- Unit 3 after the explosion on 15 March 2011

General information
- Status: Severely damaged
- Type: Reactor
- Location: Ōkuma and Futaba, Fukushima, Japan
- Coordinates: 37°25′17″N 141°1′57″E
- Construction started: 28 December 1970
- Completed: 10 October 1971
- Opened: 27 March 1976
- Closed: 19 May 2011 (shutdown)

External videos
- 24 hours live camera for Fukushima Daiichi nuclear disaster on YouTube, certified by Tokyo Electric Power Co. Inc.

The Fukushima Daiichi (Unit 3) reactor, was 1 out of 4 reactors seriously affected during the Fukushima Daiichi nuclear disaster (福島第一原子力発電所事故, Fukushima Dai-ichi) on 11 March 2011. Overall, the plant had 6 separate boiling water reactors originally designed by General Electric (GE), and maintained by the Tokyo Electric Power Company (TEPCO). In the aftermath, Unit 3 experienced hydrogen gas explosions and suffered a partial meltdown, along with the other two reactors (1 & 2) in operation at the time the tsunami struck. Reactor 4 had been de-fueled while 5 and 6 were in cold shutdown for planned maintenance.

== Background ==
The Fukushima Daiichi Nuclear Power Plant consists of six separate boiling water reactors originally designed by General Electric (GE), and maintained by the Tokyo Electric Power Company (TEPCO). Unlike the other five reactor units, reactor 3 ran on mixed core, containing both uranium fuel and mixed uranium and plutonium oxide, or MOX fuel (with the core being approximately 6% MOX fuel). During a loss of cooling accident in a subcritical reactor, MOX fuel will not behave differently from UOX fuel. The key difference between plutonium-239 and uranium-235 is that plutonium emits fewer delayed neutrons than uranium when it undergoes fission.

While water-insoluble forms of plutonium such as plutonium dioxide are very harmful to the lungs, this toxicity is not relevant during a Loss of Coolant Accident (LOCA) because plutonium is very involatile and unlikely to leave the reactor in large amounts. Plutonium dioxide has a very high boiling point. The toxic effect of the plutonium to the public under these conditions is much less than that of iodine-131 and caesium. During a loss of cooling accident, the fuel is not subject to such intense mechanical stresses, so the release of radioactivity is controlled by the boiling point of the different elements present.

At the time of the quake, Reactor 4 had been de-fueled while 5 and 6 were in the cold shutdown for planned maintenance. Immediately after the earthquake, the remaining reactors 1-3 shut down automatically, and emergency generators came online to control electronics and coolant systems. However, the tsunami following the earthquake quickly flooded the low-lying rooms in which the emergency generators were housed. The flooded generators failed, cutting power to the critical pumps that must continuously circulate coolant water through a nuclear reactor for several days in order to keep it from melting down after being shut down. As the pumps stopped, the reactors overheated due to the normal high radioactive decay heat produced in the first few days after nuclear reactor shutdown (smaller amounts of this heat normally continue to be released for years, but are not enough to cause fuel melting).

== Disaster ==
=== Cooling problems ===
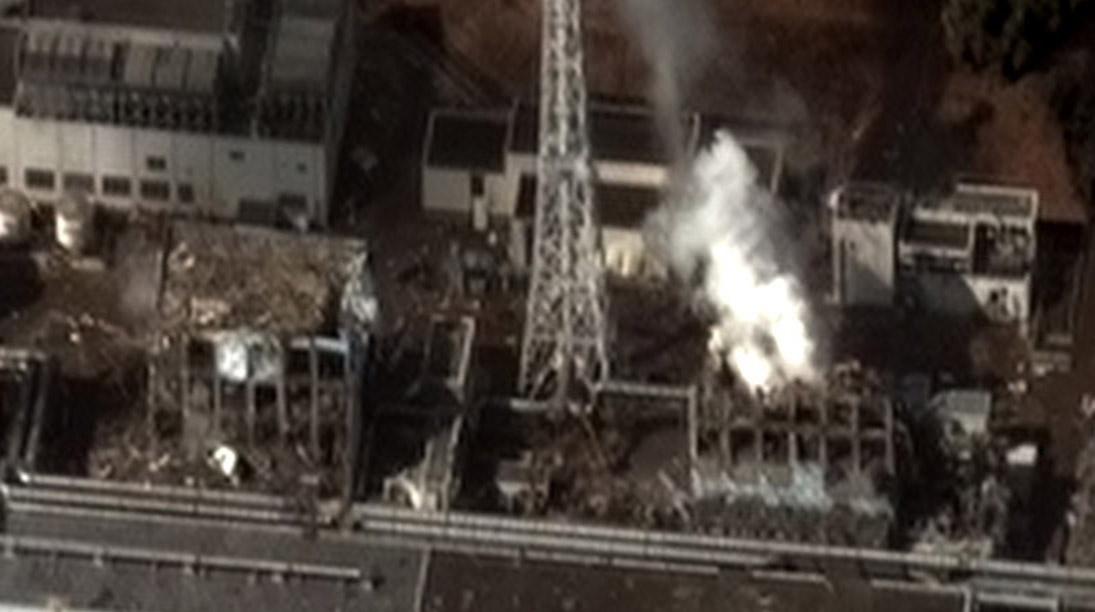
Reactor Unit 3 (right) and Unit 4 (left) on 16 March. Three of the reactors at Fukushima Daiichi overheated, causing meltdowns which released large amounts of radioactive material into the air. Pipes are the direction of the ocean.

Following the reactor SCRAM, operators activated the reactor core isolation cooling system (RCIC) and the residual heat removal system and core spray systems were made available to cool the suppression pool; whether they were activated prior to the tsunami has not been made clear. The RHRS and CS pumps were knocked out of commission by the tsunami. With DC battery power remaining, the RCIC continued to keep the water level stable, and the operators switched to the high-pressure coolant injection (HPCI) system when water level began to drop. On 13 March, the HPCI system failed, the reason for which is not completely clear due to instrumentation not being available. It is believed to be either due to loss of DC power due to depletion of batteries or to reactor pressure dropping below the level at which it can operate. Operators were unable to restart it as batteries were exhausted. After this, the operators were unable to start the RCIC system and began injecting seawater. Although it was not clear at the time, some of the fuel in Reactor 3 apparently melted around sixty hours after the earthquake (the night of the 12th to 13th).

Early on 13 March an official of the Japan Nuclear and Industrial Safety Agency (NISA) told at a news conference that the emergency cooling system of Unit 3 had failed, spurring an urgent search for a means to supply cooling water to the reactor vessel to prevent a meltdown of its reactor core. At 05:38 there was no means of adding coolant to the reactor, owing to loss of power. Work to restore power and to vent excessive pressure continued. At one point, the top three meters of the uranium/mixed oxide (MOX) fuel rods were not covered by coolant.

At 07:30 JST, TEPCO prepared to release radioactive steam, indicating that "the amount of radiation to be released would be small and not of a level that would affect human health" and manual venting took place at 08:41 and 09:20. At 09:25 JST on 13 March, operators began injecting water containing boric acid into the primary containment vessel (PCV) via the pump of a fire truck. When water levels continued to fall and pressure to rise, the injected water was switched to seawater at 13:12. By 15:00 it was noted that despite adding water the level in the reactor did not rise and radiation had increased. A rise was eventually recorded but the level stuck at 2 m below the top of reactor core. Other readings suggested that this could not be the case and the gauge was malfunctioning.

Injection of seawater into the primary containment vessel (PCV) was discontinued at 01:10 on 14 March because all the water in the reserve pool had been used up. Supplies were restored by 03:20 and injection of water resumed. On the morning of 15 March, Secretary Edano announced that according to TEPCO, at one location near reactor Units 3 and 4, radiation at an equivalent dose rate of 400 mSv/h was detected. This might have been due to debris from the explosion in Unit 4.

=== Explosion ===
At 12:33 JST on 13 March, the chief spokesman of the Japanese government, Yukio Edano said hydrogen gas was building up inside the outer building of Unit 3 just as had occurred in Unit 1, threatening the same kind of explosion. At 11:15 JST on 14 March, the envisaged explosion of the building surrounding Reactor 3 of Fukushima 1 occurred, owing to the ignition of built-up hydrogen gas. The Nuclear and Industrial Safety Agency of Japan (NISA) reported, as with Unit 1, the top section of the reactor building was blown apart, but the inner containment vessel was not breached. The explosion was larger than that in Unit 1 and felt 40 kilometers away. Pressure readings within the reactor remained steady at around 380 kPa at 11:13 and 360 kPa at 11:55 compared to nominal levels of 400 kPa and a maximum recorded of 840 kPa. Water injection continued. Dose rates of 0.05 mSv/h were recorded in the service hall and of 0.02 mSv/h at the plant entrance.

Eleven people were reported injured in the blast. TEPCO and NISA announced that four TEPCO employees, three subcontractor employees, and four Self-Defence-Force soldiers were injured. Six military personnel from the Ground Self Defense Force's Central Nuclear Biological Chemical Weapon Defense Unit, led by Colonel Shinji Iwakuma, had just arrived outside the reactor to spray it with water and were exiting their vehicles when the explosion occurred. Iwakuma later said that TEPCO had not informed them that there was a danger of a hydrogen explosion in the reactor, adding, "Tokyo Electric was desperate to stabilize (the plant), so I am not angry at them. If there is a possibility of an explosion, I would be reluctant to send my men there."

=== Cooling efforts ===
Around 10:00 JST on 16 March, NHK helicopters flying 30 km away videotaped white fumes rising from the Fukushima I facility. Officials suggested that the Reactor 3 building was the most likely source, and said that its containment systems may have been breached. The control room for Reactors 3 and 4 was evacuated at 10:45 JST but staff were cleared to return and resume water injection into the reactor at 11:30 JST. At 16:12 JST, Self Defence Force (SDF) Chinook helicopters were preparing to pour water on Unit 3, where white fumes rising from the building was believed to be water boiling away from the fuel rod cooling pond on the top floor of the reactor building, and on Unit 4 where the cooling pool was also short of water. The mission was cancelled when helicopter measurements reported radiation levels of 50 mSv. At 21:06 pm JST, the government reported that major damage to Reactor 3 was unlikely but that it nonetheless remained their highest priority.

Early on 17 March, TEPCO requested another attempt by the military to put water on the reactor using a helicopter and four helicopter drops of seawater took place around 10:00 JST. The riot police used a water cannon to spray water onto the top of the reactor building and then were replaced by members of the SDF with spray vehicles. On 18 March, a crew of firemen took over the task with six fire engines each spraying 6 tons of water in 40 minutes. 30 further hyper rescue vehicles were involved in spraying operations. Spraying continued each day to 23 March because of concerns the explosion in Unit 3 may have damaged the pool (total 3,742 tonnes of water sprayed up to 22 March) with changing crews to minimise radiation exposure. Lighting in the control room was restored on 22 March after a connection was made to a new grid power supply, and by 24 March it was possible to add 35 tonnes of seawater to the spent fuel pool using the cooling and purification system. On 21 March grey smoke was reported to be rising from the southeast corner of Unit 3 – where the spent fuel pool is located. Workers were evacuated from the area. TEPCO claimed no significant change in radiation levels, and the smoke subsided later the same day.

On 23 March, black smoke billowed from Unit 3, prompting another evacuation of workers from the plant, though Tokyo Electric Power Co. officials said there had been no corresponding spike in radiation at the plant. "We don't know the reason for the smoke", Hidehiko Nishiyama of the Nuclear Safety Agency said.

On 24 March, three workers entered the basement of the turbine building and were exposed to radiation when they stepped into contaminated water. Two of them were not wearing high boots and received beta ray burns. They were hospitalized, but their injuries were not life-threatening.

From 25 March, the source of water being injected into the core was switched from seawater to freshwater.

In August, TEPCO began considering changing the core injection method for the no. 3 reactor as it required a much larger quantity of water to cool and the temperatures remained relatively high compared to the nos. 1 and 2 reactors which required far less water. TEPCO has hypothesized that this may be because some fuel is still present above the core support plate inside the pressure vessel of the no. 3 reactor in addition to the fuel that has fallen to the bottom of the pressure vessel. The fuel on the bottom would be easily cooled by the existing method, but as the pressure vessel is leaking, any fuel located on the support plate was likely only being cooled due to the steam generated by the cooling of the melted fuel at the bottom. TEPCO began considering utilizing the reactor's core spray system pipes as an additional path of water injection and then reduce the amount of water through the existing feedwater piping system. A team of workers were sent inside the reactor building to inspect the core spray system pipes, and it was found that the piping was undamaged. Hoses were then run from the temporary injection pumps located outside the building and connected to the core spray system piping. On 1 September, TEPCO began injecting water using the new route. The new injection method has been considerably more effective in lowering the temperature of the reactor to below 100 degrees Celsius. As of 27 September, most of the no. 3 reactor's temperature readings are between 70 and 80 degrees Celsius. Later, TEPCO began utilizing the same method in the no. 2 reactor; it has not had as significant effect on the no. 2 reactor as it did on the no. 3.

== Aftermath ==
=== Possibility of criticality in the spent fuel pool ===
TEPCO claimed that there was a small but non-zero probability that the exposed fuel assemblies in the Unit 4 reactor could reach criticality. The BBC commented that criticality would never mean a nuclear explosion, but could cause a sustained release of radioactive materials. Criticality is usually considered highly unlikely, owing to the low enrichment level used in light water reactors. American nuclear engineer Arnold Gundersen, noting the much greater power and vertical debris ejection compared to the Unit 1 hydrogen blast, has theorized that the Unit 3 explosion involved a prompt criticality in the spent fuel pool material, triggered by the mechanical disruption of an initial, smaller hydrogen gas explosion in the building.

On 11 May, TEPCO released underwater robotic video from the spent fuel pool. The video appears to show large amounts of debris contaminating the pool. Based on water samples analysed, unnamed experts and TEPCO reported that the fuel rods were left "largely undamaged", and that it appears that the Unit 3 explosion was entirely related to hydrogen buildup within the building from venting of the reactor.

=== Further developments ===
Unit 3 reactor temperatures, 19 March to 28 May

On 25 March 2011, officials announced the reactor vessel might be breached and leaking radioactive material. High radiation levels from contaminated water prevented work. Japan Nuclear and Industrial Safety Agency (NISA) reiterated concerns about a Unit 3 breach on 30 March. NHK World reported the NISA's concerns as "air may be leaking", very probably through "weakened valves, pipes and openings under the reactors where the control rods are inserted", but that "there is no indication of large cracks or holes in the reactor vessels". As with the other reactors, water was transferred from condenser reservoirs to the suppression pool surge tanks so that condensers could be used to hold radioactive water pumped from the basement.

On 17 April, remote control robots were used to enter the Reactor Building and performed a series of inspections. On 27 April, TEPCO revised its estimate of damaged fuel in Unit 3 from 25% to 30%. Radiation measurements of the water in the Unit 3 spent fuel pool were reported at 140 kBq of radioactive caesium-134 per cubic centimeter, 150 kBq of caesium-137 per cubic centimeter, and 11 kBq per cubic centimeter of iodine-131 on 10 May.

On 15 May, TEPCO revealed that the pressure vessel that holds nuclear fuel "is likely to be damaged and leaking water at Units 2 and 3", which meant most of the thousands of tons of water pumped into the reactors had leaked. On 23 May, TEPCO reported that Reactor 3 had suffered a meltdown some sixty hours after the earthquake.

On 9 June, staff entered the Reactor Building to conduct radiation surveys. On 25 June and the following day boric acid dissolved in 90 tons of water was pumped into the spent fuel pool of Reactor 3. Concrete debris from the March hydrogen explosion of the reactor building has been detected in the spent fuel pool. In June TEPCO discovered that the water in the pool was strongly alkaline: the pH had reached a value of 11.2. Leaching of calcium hydroxide (portlandite) or calcium silicate hydrate (CSH) from the concrete could have caused this. The alkaline water could accelerate the corrosion of the aluminium racks holding the spent fuel rods. If the fuel assemblies would fall, this could lead to re-criticality. In the meantime preparative works began to install a recirculation cooling system at the fuel pool, that should be operational in the first weeks of July.

On 14 July, TEPCO began injecting nitrogen into the containment vessel, which was expected to reduce the likelihood of further hydrogen explosions. On 1 July, the spent fuel pool was switched from the water-injection cooling system to a circulatory cooling system. After 2 July, the Reactor was cooled using fresh water treated by the on-site water treatment plant.

On 11 January 2012, radioactively contaminated water was found in two tunnels. On 12 January, TEPCO admitted that around 300 cubic meters of water had accumulated in a tunnel near reactor No.3, with electric cables. Radioactive caesium was measured in concentrations varying from 49 to 69 becquerels per cubic centimeter. Smaller amounts of contaminated water with lower concentrations caesium was found in a tunnel near reactor no.1. How the water could accumulate at these places was under examination.

In the morning of 18 July 2013 at 8:20 a.m. (2320 GMT) small amounts of steam escaped from the reactor building. Video images made by a subcontractor, filming the destroyed building and preparing to remove rubble from the place, showed some vapors rising, but it was unclear where it came from. Although there was no change in the afternoon, TEPCO said that radiation levels did not change, and the reactor was still cooled. According to TEPCO rain could have found its way to the primary containment of the reactor, and because this vessel was still hot, it could cause the steam. The next day at 7:55 a.m. the steam was gone. Because the radiation levels were too high all work to remove rubble was done by remote control. Operations stopped after the steam was found. According to TEPCO the rain on 17 and 18 July was to blame. On 18 July the actual dosage measurement was 562 millisieverts per hour, therefore the NRA ordered TEPCO to make further investigations. On 23 July at 9:05 the steam was seen again coming out of the fifth floor just above the reactor containment. The night before a rain shower did hit the building, and water might have reached the - 38C - reactor container lid, or might have reached hot fuel left behind in the reactor vessel. At that moment, the ambient temperature was 20.3 C, and the humidity was 91.2 percent. All work removing rubble from the place was halted. During the last event, radiation levels were measured at 24 locations around the fifth floor of the reactor building. The dosage ranged between 137 millisieverts and 2,170 millisieverts per hour.

== See also ==
- List of civilian nuclear accidents
- Lists of nuclear disasters and radioactive incidents
- Timeline of the Fukushima Daiichi nuclear disaster
- Comparison of Fukushima and Chernobyl nuclear accidents
