= Fukushima nuclear accident (Unit 1 Reactor) =

One of the reactors involved in the Fukushima nuclear accident

Fukushima Daiichi (Unit 1 Reactor)
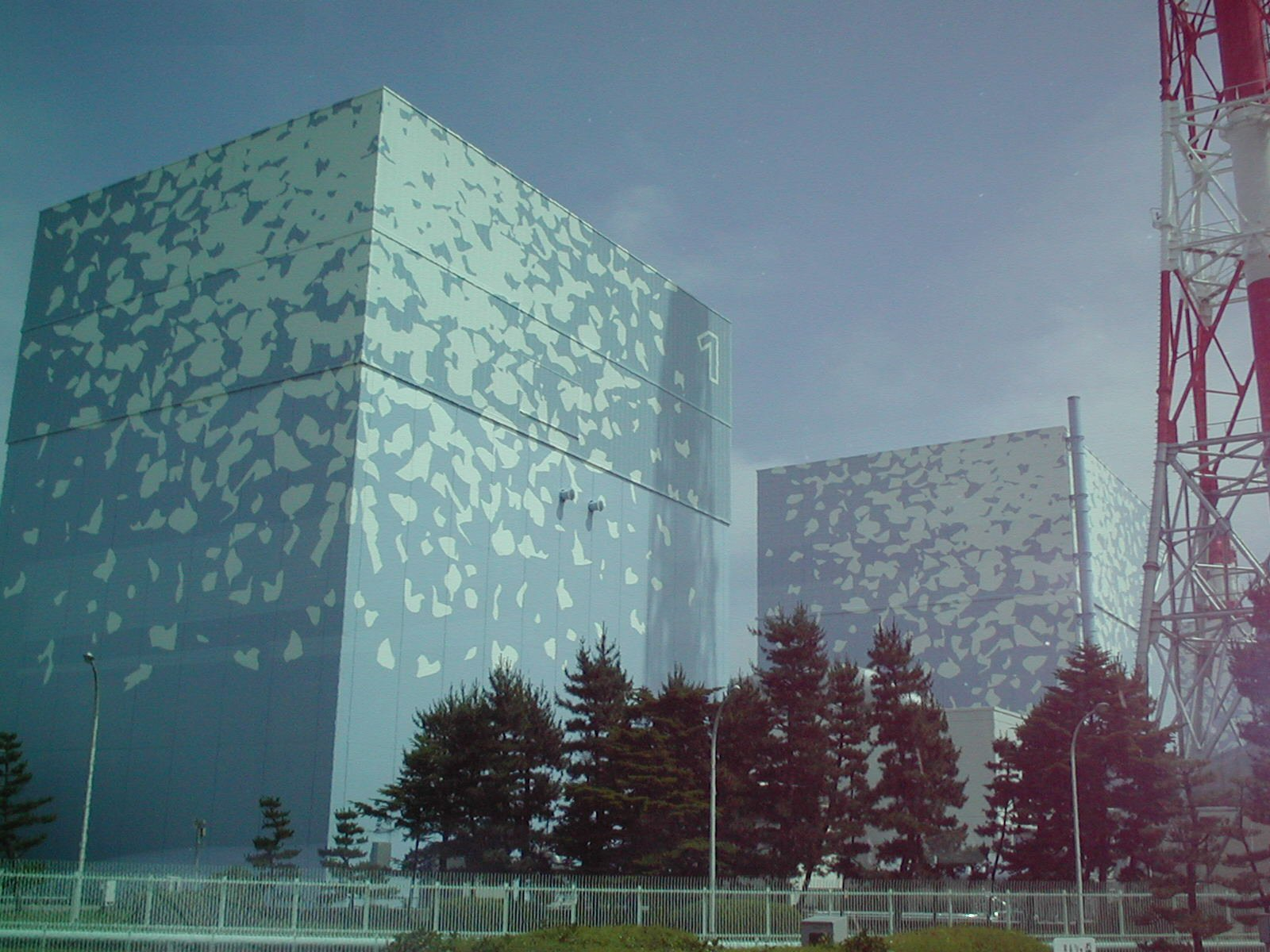
- Fukushima Unit 1 before its explosion.

General information
- Status: Severely damaged
- Type: Reactor
- Location: Ōkuma and Futaba, Fukushima, Japan
- Construction started: 25 July 1967
- Completed: 10 October 1970
- Opened: 26 March 1971
- Closed: 19 May 2011 (shutdown)

External videos
- 24 hours live camera for Fukushima Daiichi nuclear disaster on YouTube, certified by Tokyo Electric Power Co. Inc.

The Fukushima Daiichi (Unit 1) reactor, was 1 out of 4 reactors seriously affected during the Fukushima Daiichi nuclear disaster (福島第一原子力発電所事故, Fukushima Dai-ichi) on 11 March 2011.

According to a 2017 report by the Japan Atomic Energy Agency (JAEA), computer simulations suggest that core damage in Unit 1 began as early as 4-5 hours after the tsunami hit—around 19:00-20:00 JST on March 11, 2011—due to the failure of the isolation condenser. This is earlier than some initial estimates by the Tokyo Electric Power Company (TEPCO) , which placed significant damage later into March 12.

Overall, the plant had 6 separate boiling water reactors originally designed by General Electric (GE), and maintained by TEPCO. At the time of the earthquake, Reactor 4 had been de-fueled while 5 and 6 were in cold shutdown for planned maintenance. Unit 1 was automatically shut down immediately after the earthquake, and emergency generators came online to control electronics and coolant systems. However, the tsunami following the earthquake quickly flooded the low-lying rooms in which the emergency generators were housed. The flooded generators failed, cutting power to the critical pumps that must continuously circulate coolant water through the reactor core. While the government tried pumping fresh water into the core, it was already too late due to overheat. In the hours and days that followed, Unit 1 experienced a full meltdown.

In the intense heat and pressure of the melting Unit 1 reactor, a reaction between the nuclear fuel metal cladding and the remaining water surrounding it produced explosive hydrogen gas. As workers struggled to cool and shut down Unit 1, it exploded the following day (12 March). Eventually the reactor was stabilized by switching from freshwater to seawater which was pumped into the reactor. As a whole, the Japanese government estimated that the total amount of radioactivity released into the atmosphere was approximately one-tenth as much as was released during the Chernobyl disaster. The Japanese government and TEPCO were later criticized in the foreign press for poor communication with the public and improvised cleanup efforts. It's estimated that decommissioning the reactors as a whole will take 30–40 years to complete.

== Background ==
Following the earthquake, resulting tsunami cut-off the power supply and cooling of 3 reactors. This led to melting of all 3 cores in first 3 days.

F. Tanabe has estimated that each core contained the following materials:

- Uranium dioxide 78.3 tons
- Zirconium 32.7 tons
- Steel 12.5 tons
- Boron carbide 590 kilograms
- Inconel 1 ton

== Disaster ==
=== Cooling problems and radioactivity release ===
Unit 1 water levels and reactor pressures from 11 to 14 March

On 11 March at 14:46 JST, in response to the earthquake, TEPCO successfully scrammed the reactor in Unit 1, shutting down all power-producing nuclear fission chain reactions. Evacuated workers reported violent shaking and burst pipes within the reactor building. At 15:37, the quake's tsunami inundated the plant and all electrical power to the facility was lost, leaving only emergency batteries. Some of the monitoring and control systems were still operational, though Unit 1's batteries had been damaged by the flood waters. At 15:42, TEPCO declared a "Nuclear Emergency Situation" for Units 1 and 2 because "reactor water coolant injection could not be confirmed for the emergency core cooling systems." The alert was temporarily cleared when water level monitoring was restored for Unit 1 but it was reinstated at 17:07 JST. Potentially radioactive steam was released from the primary circuit into the secondary containment area to reduce mounting pressure in the core.

To cool the reactor, operators resorted to the plant's Emergency core-cooling systems (ECCS), including the isolation condensers, and the High Pressure Coolant Injection systems (HPCI). According to NHK, the isolation condenser system had not been activated in the previous 40 years, and no one present had ever witnessed its operation. It was also later discovered that TEPCO had made changes to the system's original design, without approval or notification of NISA. During the crisis, operators couldn't tell if one of the system's valves was open or closed.

About 10 minutes after the earthquake, TEPCO operators removed both of Unit 1's isolation condensers from service, and instead activated the HPCI system. At 15:07, the core spray system was activated to cool the suppression pool. Both systems lost power after the tsunami struck the plant. The tsunami's arrival prevented operators from restarting the isolation condensers for more than 30 minutes. Afterwards, they were operated intermittently. Despite being designed to cool Unit 1 for at least 8 hours, the condensers' limited operation did not reduce the heat in the core and containment vessel.

By midnight, water levels in the reactor were falling and TEPCO gave warnings of the possibility of radioactive releases. In the early hours of 12 March, TEPCO reported that radiation levels were rising in the turbine building for Unit 1. Operators were considering venting some of the mounting pressure into the atmosphere, which could result in the release of some radioactivity. Later that morning, Chief Cabinet Secretary Yukio Edano stated that the amount of potential radiation would be small and that the prevailing winds were blowing out to sea. Pressure inside Unit 1 continued to rise. At 05:30 JST, it had reached 820 kPa, 2.1 times normal. After isolation cooling had ceased to operate, TEPCO started relieving pressure and injecting water. One employee working inside Unit 1 at this time received a radiation dose of 106 mSv and was later sent to a hospital to have his condition assessed.

Without electricity, needed for water pumps and ventilation fans, rising heat within the containment area led to increasing pressure. In a press release on 12 March at 07:00 JST, TEPCO stated, "Measurement of radioactive material (iodine-131, etc.) by monitoring car indicates increasing value compared to normal level. One of the monitoring posts is also indicating higher than normal level." Dose rates recorded on the main gate rose from 69 n Gy/h (for gamma radiation, equivalent to 69 nSv/h) at 04:00 JST, 12 March, to 866 nGy/h 40 minutes later, before hitting a peak of 0.3855 mSv/h at 10:30 JST. At 13:30 JST, workers detected radioactive caesium-137 and iodine-131 near Reactor 1, a sign that water levels in the coolant system had dropped so low that some of the core's fuel had melted, after being exposed to the air. Cooling water levels had fallen so much that parts of the nuclear fuel rods were exposed and partial melting might have occurred. Radiation levels at the site boundary exceeded the regulatory limits.

=== Meltdown ===
On 12 May, TEPCO engineers confirmed that a meltdown occurred, with molten fuel having fallen to the bottom of the reactor's pressure vessel, or RPV. The utility said that fuel rods of the No. 1 reactor are fully exposed, with the water level 1 meter (3.3 feet) below the base of the fuel assembly. According to a Japanese press report, there are holes in the base of the pressure vessel – these holes were meant for the control-rods. After the fuel had melted, it produced holes in the bottom of the RPV, and then escaped into the containment vessel. In November 2011 TEPCO did not know the shape or porosity of the fuel mass, which is at the bottom of the containment vessel. As a result, it is impossible to know exactly how far the fuel mass would have eroded the concrete floor, but TEPCO estimate that no more than 70 cm of a 7.6 meter concrete slab was eroded away by the hot fuel. The production of heat and steam in unit 1 has decreased, as suggested by both radioactive decay calculations and photographic evidence (same source from TEPCO).

TEPCO estimates the nuclear fuel was exposed to the air less than five hours after the earthquake struck. Fuel rods melted away rapidly as the temperature inside the core reached 2,800 °C within six hours. In less than 16 hours, the reactor core melted and dropped to the bottom of the pressure vessel, burning a hole through the vessel. By that time, water was pumped into the reactor in an effort to prevent the worst-case scenario – overheating fuel melting its way through the containment and discharging large amounts of radionuclides in the environment. In June, the Japanese government confirmed that Unit 1 reactor vessel containment was breached, and pumped cooling water continues to leak months after the disaster.

On 11 October 2012, TEPCO released results of the first direct inspections (by remotely operated camera) of conditions in the interior of the Reactor 1 PCV. These suggest that the initial assumptions concerning the behaviour of the fuel mass during the accident may have been incorrect. In particular, the distribution of radiation levels within the PCV, with peak levels being around the bottom head of the RPV, suggest that the majority of the fuel has in fact been retained within the RPV. Radiation levels are also notably lower around the lower parts of the "Drywell", suggesting that fuel had not reached the bottom of the containment vessel, or damaged the concrete floor slab. There is a further issue in that radiation levels within the water inside the containment are markedly higher than those in the reactor basements, suggesting that either there is limited flow from the PCV to the basement, or that substantial dilution is taking place - raising the issue of what is the flow path for the water.

=== Hydrogen explosion ===
At 07:00 JST on 12 March, Prime Minister Naoto Kan asked Daiichi director Masao Yoshida why his workers were not opening the valves to release rising steam pressure within the reactor. Yoshida answered that they couldn't open the electrical valves because of the power failure and the radiation was too high to send workers in to manually do the job. Nevertheless, with the pressure and temperatures continuing to rise, at 09:15, TEPCO sent workers to begin manually opening the valves. The high radiation slowed the work and the valves were not opened until 14:30.

At 15:36 JST on 12 March, there was an explosion in the reactor building at Unit 1 that was primarily directed sideways. The side walls of the upper level were blown away, leaving in place only the vertical steel framed gridworks. Despite the damage, the remaining walls were relatively intact compared to later explosions at Units 3 and 4. The roof of the building was not designed to withstand the high pressure of an explosion, and collapsed filling the reactor with debris. The primary containment consists of "drywell" and "wetwell" concrete structures below the top level, immediately surrounding the reactor pressure vessel. The secondary containment includes the top floor with water-filled pools for storing fresh or irradiated fuel and for storage of irradiated tools and structures.

Experts soon agreed that the cause was a hydrogen explosion. Almost certainly the hydrogen was formed inside the reactor vessel because of falling water levels exposing zircaloy structures/fuel assembly cladding, which then reacted with steam and produced hydrogen, with the hydrogen subsequently vented into the containment building. When the hydrogen reached ignition concentration in the air of the secondary containment building, an ignition source such as a spark triggered a hydrogen-oxygen explosion, blowing out the walls of this building from the inside.

Officials indicated that reactor primary containment had remained intact and that there had been no large leaks of radioactive material, although an increase in radiation levels was confirmed following the explosion. The report of the fact-finding commission states that "There is a possibility that the bottom of the RPV [reactor pressure vessel] was damaged and some of the fuel might have dropped and accumulated on the D/W [dry well] floor (lower pedestal)." The Fukushima prefectural government reported radiation dose rates at the plant reaching 1.015 m Sv/h. The IAEA stated on 13 March that four workers had been injured by the explosion at the Unit 1 reactor, and that three injuries were reported in other incidents at the site. They also reported one worker was exposed to higher-than-normal radiation levels but the level fell below their guidance for emergency situations.

=== Seawater used for cooling ===
At 20:05 JST on 12 March, the Japanese government ordered seawater to be injected into Unit 1 in a new effort to cool the reactor core. The treatment had been held as a last resort since it ruins the reactor. TEPCO started seawater cooling at 20:20 JST, adding boric acid as a neutron absorber to prevent a criticality accident. The water would take five to ten hours to fill the reactor core, after which the reactor would cool down in around ten days. The injection of seawater into the reactor pressure vessel was done by fire department trucks.

At 01:10 JST on 14 March, injection of seawater was halted for two hours because all available water in the plant pools had run out (similarly, feed to Unit 3 was halted). NISA news reports stated 70% of the fuel rods had been damaged when uncovered. On 21 March, injection of seawater continued, as did repairs to the control instrumentation. On 23 March, it became possible to inject water into the reactor using the feed water system rather than the fire trucks, raising the flow rate from 2 to 18 m^{3}/h (later reduced to 11m^{3}/h). By 24 March the spent fuel pool was "thought to be fully or partially exposed". Pressure in the reactor had increased owing to the seawater injection, resulting in steam being vented, later alleviated by reducing the water flow. Temperature increases were also reportedly temporary. TEPCO condensed some of the steam to water in the spent fuel pool.

It was estimated that as much as 26 tonnes of sea salt may have accumulated in reactor Unit 1 and twice that amount in Units 2 and 3. As salt clogs cooling pipes and erodes zirconium oxide layer of the fuel rods, switching to the use of freshwater for cooling was a high priority. The use of seawater has the potential to make uranium chemistry more complex; in pure water the hydrogen peroxide formed by the radiolysis of water can react with uranium dioxide to form a solid peroxide mineral known as studtite. According to Navrotsky et al. this mineral has been found in the fuel storage pond at the plutonium production site at Hanford. Navrotsky et al. report that when alkali metal ions are present, uranium can form nanoparticles (U_{60} clusters) which may be more mobile than the solid studtite. A review of the research done at the University of Notre Dame on the subject of nanoscale actinide clusters was published in 2010.

=== Reactor stabilization ===
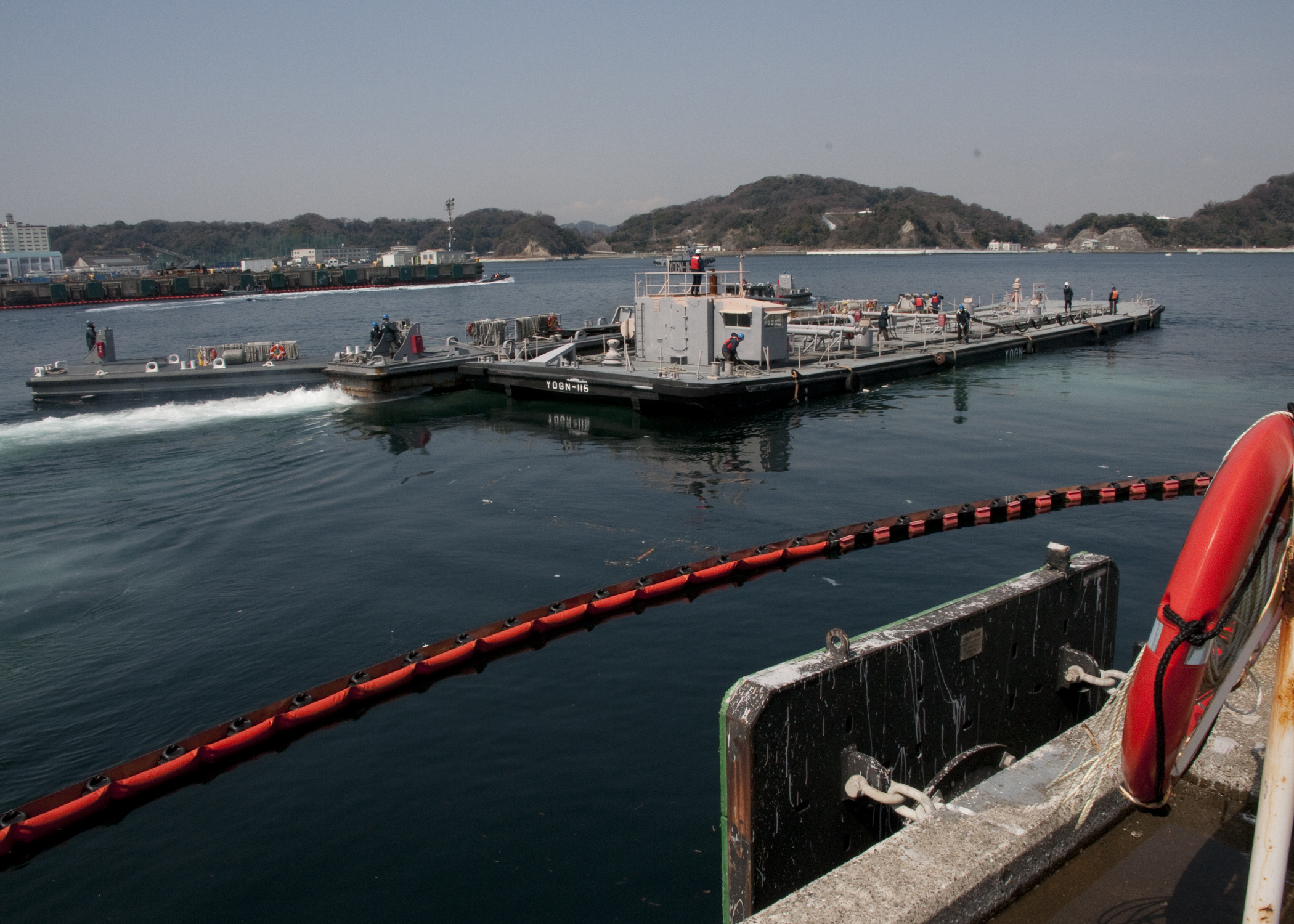
Because of saltwater corrosion problems and pipes clogging by salt, fresh cooling water is transported by barge to Fukushima.

By 24 March, electrical power (initially from temporary sources, but off-site power used from 3 April) was restored to parts of the unit which included the Main Control Room. On the following day, fresh water became available again to be added to the reactor instead of salt water. A volume of 1890 m^{3} (500,000 US gal) of fresh water was brought to the plant by a barge provided by the US Navy. Concurrently, work was also ongoing to repair the unit's cooling systems. Pumping began on 28 March to remove water contaminated with radioactive ^{137}Cs and ^{131}I from basement areas, storing it in the condenser system. On 29 March, the fire trucks which had been used to inject water into the reactor were replaced by electrical pumps. Around this time however, pumping was halted because condensate reservoirs were almost full and plans were being considered to transfer water to the suppression pool surge tanks.

On 7 April, TEPCO began injecting nitrogen into the containment vessel, which was expected to reduce the likelihood of further hydrogen explosions. At some point in the day before a large aftershock, temperatures in the reactor core unexpectedly "surged in temperature to 260 °C"; the cause was unknown, but the temperature dropped to 246 °C by 8 April. Nitrogen injections were later repeated on the other units at Fukushima. As the inside of the reactor building is now lethal to humans, a remote control robot was used to enter the building on 17 April and performed a series of inspections that lasted almost 2 weeks. During this period, TEPCO considered filling the "containment vessel with water to cool the reactor" two times (23 and 26 April) despite concerns for building's integrity due to concerns that Unit 1's fuel rods may be exposed to air.

On 27 April, TEPCO revised its estimate of damaged fuel in Unit 1 from 55% to 70%. During this day, efforts were also slowed by Unit 1 radiation measurements which read as high as1.120 m Sv/h.. Relieving news came two days later, as the robotic inspection which had begun on 17 April confirmed that there was no significant water leakage coming from the containment vessel. On 13 May, TEPCO announced it would proceed with a plan to fill the containment vessel despite the possibility of holes caused by melting fuel elements in the pressure vessel. This plan would have increased the amount of water pumped to Unit 1 to compensate for any leakage from the holes. The idea was ultimately abandoned on 15 May after it was discovered that Unit 1's basement was already half flooded. Other events in early/mid May included the installation of ventilation systems in the Reactor Building, to clean the highly radioactive air encapsulated in it. Preparatory work was started during this time on the installation of Reactor Building covers. The water level gauge for the reactor was also calibrated, and it was subsequently identified that the water level was lower than previously thought (as the water level went off the lower side of the gauge).

TEPCO staff were finally able to access Unit 1's Reactor Building on 20 May, and confirmed the reactor water level and radioactivity. On 21 August, TEPCO reported that all of the temperature sensors of Unit 1 were recording temperatures of less than 100 degrees Celsius for the Friday 19 August reading. Construction work on the Reactor Building covers which began on 28 June was completed on 28 October for Unit 1. On 19 January 2012, the interior of the primary containment vessel of reactor 2 was inspected by TEPCO for the first time after the accident, with an industrial endoscope. With this device photos were taken and the temperature was measured at this spot and from the cooling-water inside, in an attempt to calibrate the existing temperature-measurements that could have an error margin of 20 °C (36 °F). The procedure lasted 70 minutes. The photos showed parts of the walls and pipes inside the containment vessel, but they were unclear and blurred, most likely due to water vapors and the radiation inside. According to TEPCO the photos showed no serious damage. The temperature measured inside was 44.7 °C (112.5 °F) and did not differ much from the 42.6 °C (108.7 °F) measured outside the vessel.

== Aftermath ==
=== Possibility of criticality ===
Reports of 13 observations of neutron beams 1.5 km "southwest of the plant's No. 1 and 2 reactors" from 13 to 16 March raised the possibility that nuclear chain reactions could have occurred after the initial SCRAMing of the reactors at Fukushima Daiichi. 16 March reports that fuel rods in the spent fuel pool at Unit 4 could have been exposed to air appeared to indicate that uncontrolled fission may have occurred in that fuel pool. Later reports of exceptionally high iodine-134 levels appeared to confirm this theory because very high levels of iodine-134 would be indicative of criticality. The same report also showed high measurements of chlorine-38, which some nuclear experts used to calculate that self-propagating fission must be occurring in Unit 1. Despite TEPCO suggesting the iodine-134 report was inaccurate, the IAEA appeared to accept the chlorine-based analysis as a valid theory suggesting criticality when it stated at a press conference that "melted fuel in the No. 1 reactor building may be causing isolated, uncontrolled nuclear chain reactions". TEPCO confirmed its concern about the accuracy of the high iodine and chlorine report by formally retracting the report on 21 April, which eliminated both the exceptionally high iodine-134 and chlorine-38 levels as proof of criticality. TEPCO did not appear to comment on the criticality concern when withdrawing its report, but the IAEA has not withdrawn its comments, and some off-site experts find the currently measured iodine-134 levels higher than expected.

=== Water release ===
Since 2 July 2011, the reactor has been cooled using fresh water from the on-site water treatment plant. From 31 March 2012, additional fresh water was added to the spent fuel pool, initially by using a concrete pump. Fresh water was used from 14 May. By 29 May water was able to be injected using a temporary pump and the Spent Fuel Pool Cooling (FPC) line. On 10 August, the spent fuel pool was switched from the water-injection system – that functioned some 5 months – to a circulatory cooling system. For the first time since the 11 March disaster, all four damaged reactors at the plant were using circulatory cooling systems with heat-exchangers.

TEPCO continued to pump water onto the previously melted-down fuel cores to prevent them from once again overheating. Contaminated cooling water eventually collected on site where 1 million tons has been stored in hundreds of tall steel tanks. Large filtration systems are used to clean the water of its radioactive contaminants, but cannot remove tritium, a radioactive isotope of hydrogen (Hydrogen-3) bonded into water molecules (tritiated water). In 2016, only 14 grams of tritium in total was estimated to be contained in 800,000 cubic meters of contaminated water stored on site. It was previously estimated by TEPCO that immediate site would run out by 2022 as the tritium-contaminated water continued to accumulate. To solve this issue TEPCO proposed to release the contaminated water into the Pacific Ocean. This was met by heavy criticism by environmental groups, local fishermen and several Asian governments, who claimed that storage area is available in the extensive, contaminated exclusion zone around the reactor. Despite the protests, Japan's government approved the release of treated radioactive water from the plant into the Pacific Ocean – beginning in 2023 – over the course of an estimated 40 years.

=== Dismantling Unit 1 ===
It's estimated that the reactors as a whole will take 30–40 years to be decommissioned. On August 1, 2013, the Japanese Industry Minister Toshimitsu Motegi approved the creation of a structure to develop the technologies and processes necessary to dismantle the four reactors damaged in the Fukushima accident.

== See also ==
- List of civilian nuclear accidents
- Lists of nuclear disasters and radioactive incidents
- Timeline of the Fukushima Daiichi nuclear disaster
- Comparison of Fukushima and Chernobyl nuclear accidents
