= Condenser =

Condenser may refer to:

== Heat transfer ==
- Condenser (heat transfer), a device or unit used to condense vapor into liquid. Specific types include:
  - HVAC air coils
  - Condenser (laboratory), a range of laboratory glassware used to remove heat from fluids
  - Surface condenser, a heat exchange installed in steam-electric power stations to condense turbine exhaust steam into water
  - Isolation condenser, an emergency passive system for cooling in some reactors (BWR/2, BWR/3 and SBWR series) in nuclear energy production

=== Steam engines ===
- Condensing steam locomotive
- Jet condenser
- Surface condenser

== Other uses ==
- Condensers for collecting atmospheric moisture:
  - Air well (condenser)
  - Atmospheric water generator
- Condenser (optics), a lens which gathers visible light and directs it onto a projection lens to concentrate it
- Capacitor, formerly called a Leyden jar or condenser, an electrical device that stores energy
- Condenser microphone, a capacitor-based microphone that converts sound waves into an electrical signal
- Synchronous condenser, a rotating machine similar to a motor, used to control AC power flow in electric power transmission

== See also ==
- Enlarger
- Köhler illumination
- Projector (disambiguation)
- Telescope
