= Fukushima nuclear accident (Unit 2 Reactor) =

One of the reactors involved in the Fukushima nuclear accident

Fukushima Daiichi (Unit 2 Reactor)
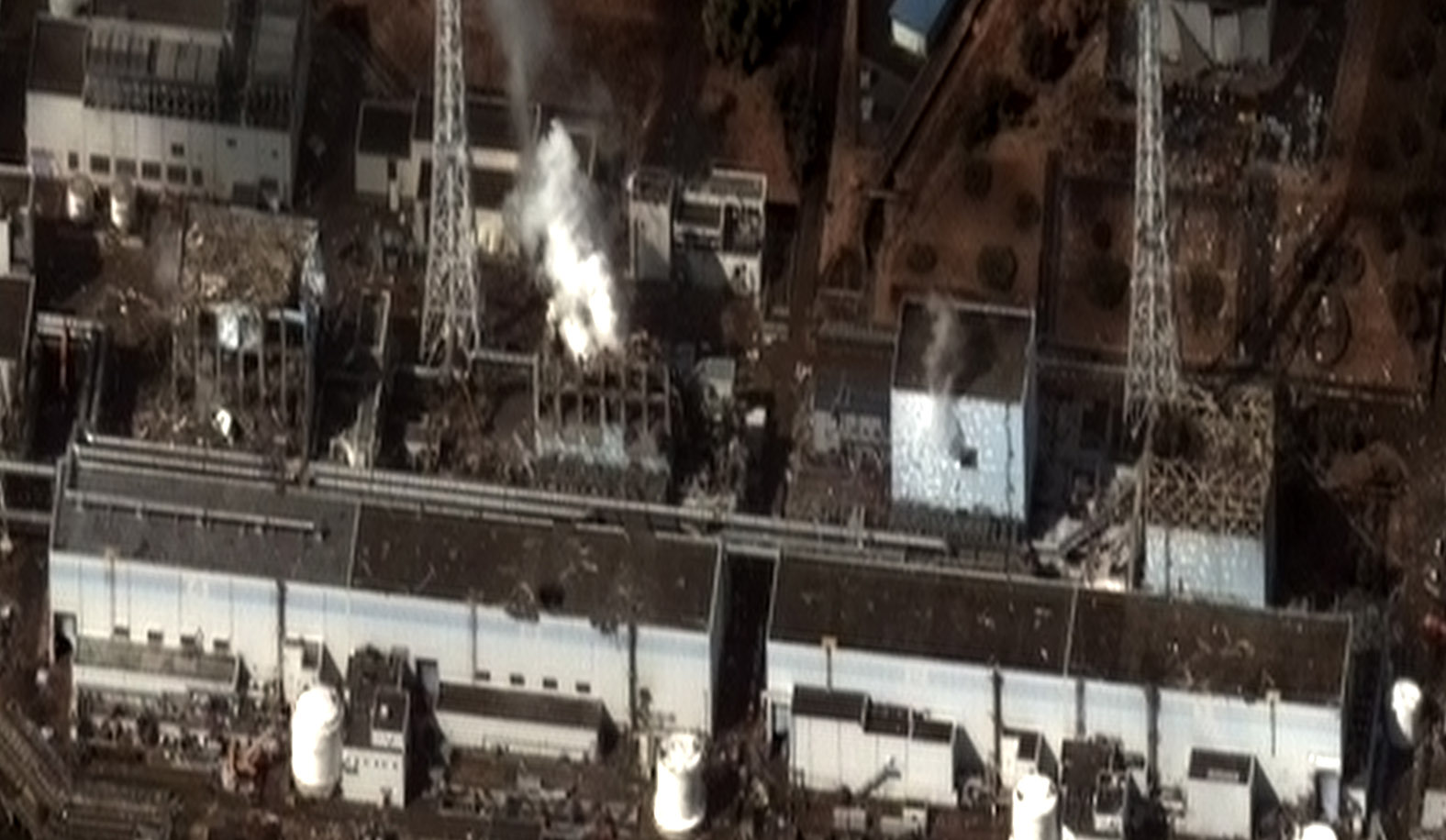
- Overhead view of the complex, Unit 2 is the second one from the right (blue cladding still largely in place).
- Interactive map of the Fukushima Daiichi (Unit 2 Reactor) area

General information
- Status: Severely damaged
- Type: Reactor
- Location: Ōkuma and Futaba, Fukushima, Japan
- Coordinates: 37°25′17″N 141°1′57″E
- Construction started: 9 June 1969
- Completed: 10 October 1970
- Opened: 18 July 1974
- Closed: 19 May 2011 (shutdown)

External videos
- 24 hours live camera for Fukushima Daiichi nuclear disaster on YouTube, certified by Tokyo Electric Power Co. Inc.

The Fukushima Daiichi (Unit 2) reactor, was 1 out of 4 reactors seriously affected during the Fukushima Daiichi nuclear disaster (福島第一原子力発電所事故, Fukushima Dai-ichi) on 11 March 2011. Overall, the plant had 6 separate boiling water reactors originally designed by General Electric (GE), and maintained by the Tokyo Electric Power Company (TEPCO). At the time of the earthquake, Reactor 4 had been de-fueled while 5 and 6 were in cold shutdown for planned maintenance.

== Background ==
The plant comprises six separate boiling water reactors originally designed by General Electric (GE), and maintained by the Tokyo Electric Power Company (TEPCO). At the time of the quake, Unit 4 had been de-fueled while 5 and 6 were in cold shutdown for planned maintenance. Unit 2 was operating at the time of the earthquake and experienced the same controlled initial shutdown as the other units. As with unit 1, the reactor scrammed following the earthquake. The two diesel generators came online and initially all cooling systems were available. Initially the high pressure coolant injection (HPCI) system was primary cooling the core and at 15:00 operators activated the residual heat removal system main pump and the containment vessel spray pump at 15:07 to cool the suppression pool; all these systems failed following both AC power and DC power loss after the tsunami as the diesel generators and other systems failed when the tsunami overran the plant. The reactor core isolation cooling (RCIC) system was manually activated by operators at 15:39 following power loss, but by midnight the status of the reactor was unclear; some monitoring equipment was still operating on temporary power. The coolant level was stable and preparations were underway to reduce pressure in the reactor containment vessel should it become necessary, though TEPCO did not state in press releases what these preparations were, and the government had been advised that this might happen.

== Disaster ==
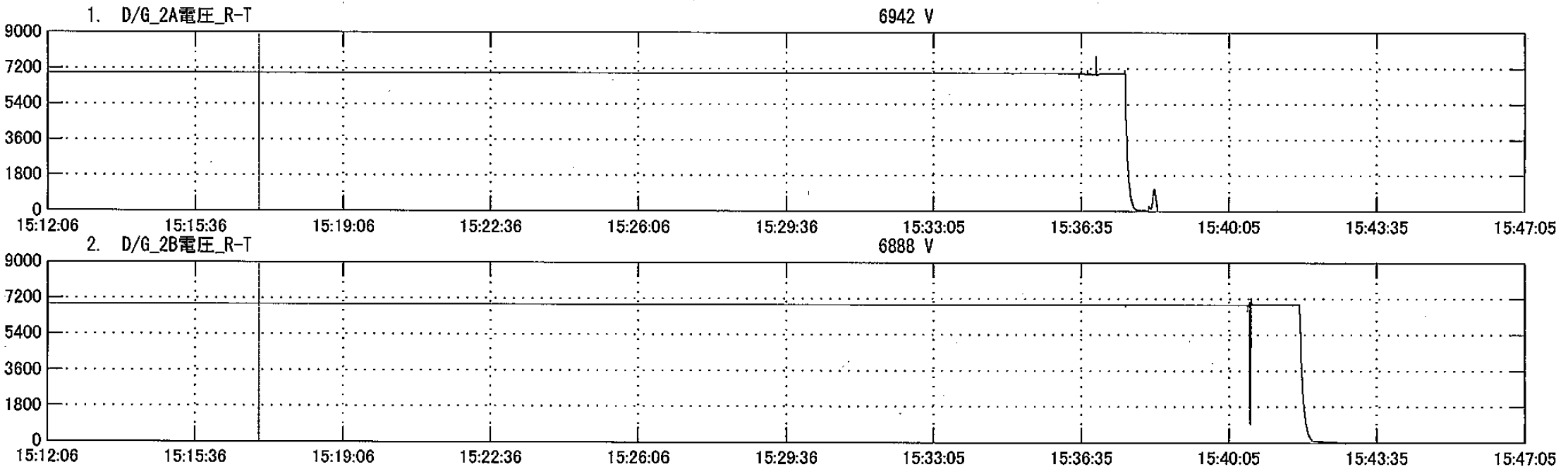
Failure of both Unit 2 diesel generators

=== Cooling problems ===
TEPCO reported that the RCIC shut down around 19:00 JST on 12 March, and that the reactor containment vessel started reducing pressure before midnight. The IAEA later revealed that no venting had taken place at the plant. The following day at 09:00 JST, the RCIC was reported to be operating again. A New York Times report suggested that plant officials initially concentrated efforts on a damaged fuel storage pool at Unit 2, diverting attention from problems arising at the other reactors, but that incident was not reported in official press releases. The IAEA reported that on 14 March at 09:30, the RCIC was still operating and that power was being provided by a mobile generator. At some point during the day TEPCO reported the shutdown of the RCIC system presumably due to low reactor pressure. Operators had for days taken measures to prevent the reactor pressure from dropping below the level at which the RCIC can operate to keep it running as long as possible. The system though, was never designed to be used for an extended period. Fuel rods had been fully exposed for 140 minutes and there was a risk of a core meltdown. Reactor water level indicators were reported to be showing minimum-possible values at 19:30 JST on 14 March. Meanwhile, radiation dose rates measured at the gate of the plant (at 21:37 JST) reached a maximum of 3.13 m Sv/h, which was enough to reach the annual limit for non-nuclear workers in twenty minutes. These levels later subsided as another measurement taken at 22:35 showed a lower reading of 0.326 mSv/h. Workers concurrently succeeded in refilling half the reactor with water but parts of the rods were still exposed, and technicians could not rule out the possibility that some had melted. It was believed that around 23:00 JST, the 4 m long fuel rods in the reactor were fully exposed for the second time.

At 00:30 JST on 15 March, NHK ran a live press conference with TEPCO stating that the water level had sunk under the rods once again and pressure in the vessel was raised. The utility said that the hydrogen explosion at Unit 3 might have caused a glitch in the cooling system of Unit 2: Four out of five water pumps being used to cool the Unit 2 reactor had failed after the explosion at Unit 3. In addition, the last pump had briefly stopped working when its fuel ran out. To replenish the water, the contained pressure would have to be lowered first by opening a valve of the vessel. The unit's air flow gauge was accidentally turned off and, with the gauge turned off, flow of water into the reactor was blocked leading to full exposure of the rods. Water was later pumped into Unit 2 again by 04:11 JST. It was later revealed that workers were minutes from restoring power to the standby liquid control (SLC) system pumps in unit 2 as a way to inject borated water once the RCIC shut down and had spent hours laying cable from a generator truck to the unit 2 power center when the unit 1 explosion occurred. This damaged the cable preventing this method from being used. It is possible this system could have prevented a complete meltdown as it took hours after the explosion until injection using fire trucks could be started.

=== Hydrogen explosion ===
Radiation spike during the explosion of Unit 2

After Unit 3 exploded from built up hydrogen gas, the debris blew holes through the walls of Unit 2. It was initially hoped that these holes would vent any hydrogen gas coming from Unit 2 and prevent a similar explosion. This unfortunately did not hold true as an explosion was heard after 06:14 JST on 15 March in Unit 2, possibly damaging the pressure-suppression system at the bottom part of the containment vessel. The radiation level was reported as exceeding the legal limit, and the plant's operator started to evacuate all non-essential workers from the plant. Only a minimum crew of 50 men, also referred to as the Fukushima 50, was left at the site. Soon after, radiation equivalent dose rates had risen to 8.2 mSv/h around two hours after the explosion and again down to 2.4 mSv/h, shortly after. Three hours after the explosion, the rates had risen to 11.9 mSv/h.

While admitting that the suppression pool at the bottom of the containment vessel had been damaged in the explosion, causing a drop of pressure there, Japanese nuclear authorities emphasized that the containment had not been breached as a result of the explosion and contained no obvious holes. In a news conference on 15 March the director general of the IAEA, Yukiya Amano, said that there was a "possibility of core damage" at Unit 2 of less than 5%. Japan's Nuclear and Industrial Safety Agency (NISA) stated 33% of the fuel rods were damaged, in news reports the morning of 16 March. In the week that followed concerns were raised over a possible breach from the explosion at either the suppression pool, or the reactor vessel. Images taken by a robotic inspection in 2012 later revealed superficial surface damage to pipework, but show the outer surface of the torus to be in normal condition. The potential break points of the manhole covers were also found to be intact.

=== Meltdown and seawater used for cooling ===
Seawater-contamination along coast with caesium-137, from 21 March until 5 May (Source: GRS)

In their attempt to prevent a meltdown, the government ordered that seawater be used to cool the reactors as no alternatives were available at the time. At 20:05 JST on 14 March, the Japanese government ordered seawater to be injected into Unit 2 in a new effort to cool the reactor core. This process was later changed to fresh water and then back to sea water. It was initially thought that Unit 2 had been spared a meltdown, but this notion soon came into question. On 29 March, Richard Lahey, former head of safety research for boiling-water reactors at General Electric, speculated that the reactor core may have melted through the reactor containment vessel onto a concrete floor, raising concerns of a major release of radioactive material, while failing to divulge the report by Dale G. Bridenbaugh which condemned the design as "unsafe". On 27 April, TEPCO revised its estimate of damaged fuel in Unit 2 from 30% to 35%. TEPCO finally confirmed on 23 May that Unit 2 suffered a meltdown about 100 hours after the earthquake.

Tepco-workers were able to enter the building of reactor 2 a month later where they installed and replaced a provisional gauge for measuring the water level inside the reactor. The results were disappointing, as 2 days later Tepco reported that it was still not possible to obtain accurate data on the water level and pressure from Unit 2. The temperature near the containment vessel was reported to be very high which caused the new gauge to not function properly. One of the key issues mentioned was the evaporated water inside the tubes of the gauge.

=== Reactor stabilization ===
By midday on 19 March grid power had been connected to the existing transformer at Unit 2 and work continued to connect the transformer to the new distribution panel installed in a nearby building. Outside electricity became available at 15:46 JST on 20 March, but equipment still had to be repaired and reconnected. On 24 March, electrical power (initially from temporary sources, but off-site power used from 3 April) was restored to parts of the unit which included the Main Control Room. The IAEA reported temperatures on 27 March at the bottom of Unit 2's Reactor Pressure Vessel (RPV) fell from 100 °C (212 °F) to 97 °C (206.6 °F). While operators attempted to pump water from the turbine hall basement to the condenser, both of condensers turned out to be full. Pumps were installed which moved up to 25 tons of condensed water per hour into on site storage tanks. This in turn freed up the needed storage condenser space for water in Unit 2's basement. Ventilation systems were installed in Unit 2 on 11 June to clean the highly radioactive air encapsulated within the Reactor Building.

On 28 June, TEPCO began injecting nitrogen into the containment vessel, which was expected to reduce the likelihood of further hydrogen explosions.

Since 2 July, the Reactor has been cooled using fresh water treated by the on site water treatment plant.

On 14 September at 11AM (JST) TEPCO began injecting water into the No. 2 reactor using the core spray system piping in addition to the feed water piping already being used as this method seemed to be effective in reducing the temperature in the No. 3 reactor. At that time the temperature at the bottom of the No. 2 reactor was still 114.4 degrees Celsius (237.92 °F), compared to the 84.9 °C degrees(184.82 °F) in the No.1 reactor and the 101.3 °C (214.34 °F) in the No. 3 reactor. The new method has led to some temperature decrease, but not as significant as the decrease that occurred in the No.3 reactor.

After some positive effect was noticed using both the core spray system and feed water piping, TEPCO decided on 16 September to increase the amount of water pumped into the No. 2 reactor by one ton, in an attempt to further lower the temperature in the core, to a total of 7 tons per hour. The same was done for reactor No. 3, where 5 tons were added, bring the total to 12 tons per hour. TEPCO also added that the volume of cooling water into the No. 1 reactor would be increased as necessary.

On 18 April 2011, remote control robot was used to enter the Reactor Building and performed a series of inspections.

On 19 April 2011, TEPCO began transferring excess radioactive cooling water from the reactor's basement and maintenance tunnels to a waste processing facility.

On 21 September 2011, Masanori Naitoh, director in charge of nuclear safety analysis at the Institute of Applied Energy, an expert commenting on the plan to contain the crisis at the Fukushima Daiichi nuclear plant, mentioned that the interior temperatures of the damaged reactors had to be checked to confirm cold-shutdown. Naitoh said that TEPCO was only measuring temperatures outside the reactors, and that the temperatures inside should be confirmed through simulation to confirm that they had fallen below 100 degrees, and that there were no risks of nuclear reactions recurring.

In the first week of February 2012, temperatures inside reactor No. 2 became unstable. On 7 February, the amount of cooling water was increased from 10.5 tons to 13.5 tons per hour. After a slight initial decrease in temperature, sensor readings again showed the temperature rising at some locations in the bottom of the reactor. On 11 February, temperatures rose once again. On 12 February, the temperature rose to 78.3 °C (172.94 °F). TEPCO denied the possibility of the core going critical again, because that would produce xenon, which was still below detectable levels. To prevent any possible nuclear criticality, TEPCO planned to dump boric acid into the reactor and to increase the volume of cooling water by 3 tons per hour.

Since only one of the temperature-sensors showed fluctuating readings between 70 °C and 90 °C, TEPCO and NISA thought this sensor was malfunctioning. The sensor works on the principle of changing resistance between the surface of two different metals as the temperature changes. TEPCO planned measurements on this sensor. Since the radiation around reactor 2 could make it impossible to place new sensors inside the reactor vessel, the situation would become very serious if the other two sensors inside the reactor were to also fail. After that, it would be impossible to monitor the reactor. Kazuhiko Kudo, a professor of nuclear engineering at the university of Kyushu, Japan commented: "Because we haven't been able to grasp how the nuclear fuel in the cores has been distributed, it's impossible to rule out localized high temperature spots. As the high radiation rules out installing new temperature sensors, if the last two sensors fail, the situation will be much more serious indeed." On 26 February, TEPCO sent a report to the Japanese government about the malfunctioning temperature-sensors and has since ceased monitoring that sensor. The other two temperature-sensors and the radiation levels inside the containment vessel would be used to monitor the state of the cold shutdown. The amount of cooling water would be lowered, after NISA's approval.

On 15 April 2012, one of the two remaining temperature-sensors at the bottom of the No.2 reactor gave false readings, and because the electric resistance was found greatly increased, TEPCO concluded that it was broken, leaving only 18 of 36 temperature sensors still functioning. At 11 a.m., the remaining thermometer at this place measured 46.7 degrees Celsius.

On 1 June 2012 TEPCO reported that another thermometer had malfunctioned, resulting in more than half of the temperature sensors, 23 out of 41, now being out of use in reactor No. 2., thus making it more problematic to monitor the state of "cold-shutdown". According to TEPCO, the high humidity in the reactor may be a contributing factor in the failure of the sensors. TEPCO stated that it is currently decontaminating the site and training workers to install new thermometers. The plan is to install new thermometers through pipes that are connected to the reactor. TEPCO stated that it plans to decontaminate the site and install the new thermometers by late July 2012.

On 15 June 2012 TEPCO reported that a robot that was sent into the No. 2 reactor building on 13 June 2012 to take video images and radiation measurements, detected a reading of 880mSv (millisieverts) per hour of radiation on the fifth floor, which one floor (4.5 meters) directly above the reactor containment vessel. TEPCO suspects that during initial accident in March 2011, that radioactive substances leaked from the No. 2 reactor moved through the building, but after analyzing the images taken by the robot it could not find the exact route the radioactive substances traveled, and images taken by the robot found no major damage on the fifth floor. During the March 2011 nuclear accident the No. 2 reactor is believed to have released the largest amount of radioactive substances. But the overall route the radioactive material traveled has yet to be determined. TEPCO needs to find and repair the damaged parts of the reactor to recover melted nuclear fuel before TEPCO can begin the process of decommissioning the reactor. However high radiation often stops workers from entering the building. This scenario means it will take a long time to find the problems in the containment vessel.

On 3 October 2012 TEPCO installed a new temperature-sensor inside reactor nr.2. The thermometer showed 42.6 degrees Celsius, another nearby the RPV bottom monitoring instrument (TE-2-3-69H3) indicated 46.1 degrees. At that moment only 1 out of the existing 5 sensors was functioning properly.

== Aftermath ==
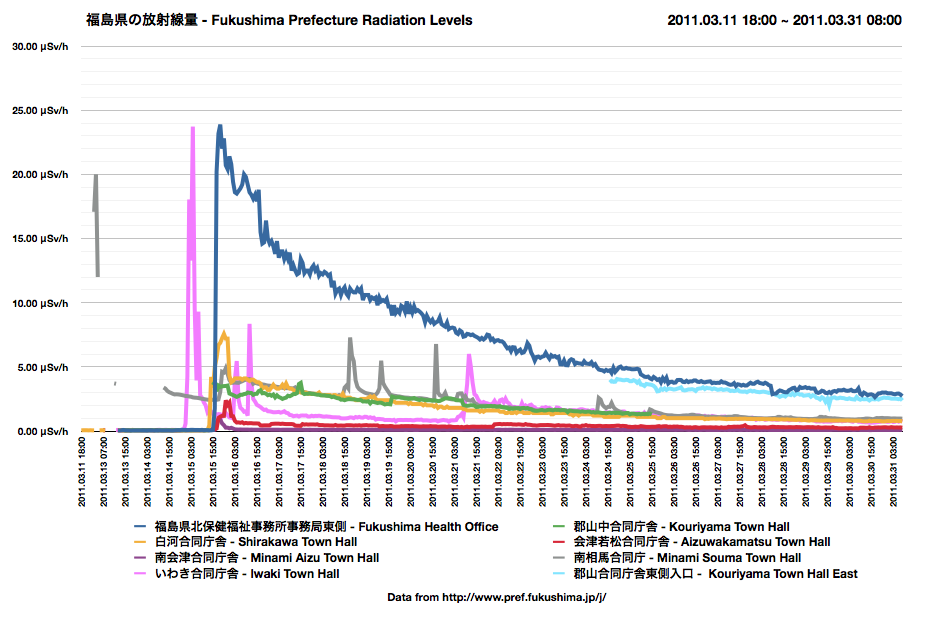
Radiation measurements from Fukushima Daiichi NPP, March 2011

=== Pressure vessel damage ===
On 15 May, TEPCO revealed that the pressure vessel that holds nuclear fuel "is likely to be damaged and leaking water at Units 2 and 3", which means most of the thousands of tons of water pumped into the reactors had leaked.

=== Containment damage ===
On 27 March, TEPCO reported measurements of very high radiation levels, over 1000 mSv/h, in the basement of the Unit 2 turbine building, which officials reported was 10 million times higher than what would be found in the water of a normally functioning reactor. Hours into the media frenzy, the company retracted its report and stated that the figures were not credible. "because the level was so high the worker taking the reading had to evacuate before confirming it with a second reading." Shortly following the ensuing wave of media retractions that discredited the report worldwide, TEPCO clarified its initial retraction; the radiation from the pool surface in the basement of the Unit 2 turbine building was found to be "more than 1,000 millisieverts per hour", as originally reported, but the concentration of radioactive substances was 100,000 times higher than usual, not 10 million.

=== Possibility of re-criticality ===
On 1 November 2011 TEPCO said that xenon-133 and xenon-135 were detected in gas-samples taken from the containment vessel of reactor 2, in a concentration of 6 to 10 (or more) parts per million becquerels per cubic centimeter. Xenon-135 was also detected in gas samples collected on 2 November. These isotopes are the result of nuclear fission-reaction of uranium. Because the short half-lives of these gases: (Xe-133: 5 days Xe-135: 9 hours), the presence could only mean that nuclear fissions were occurring at some places in the reactor. Boric-acid was poured into the reactor in an attempt to stop the fission-reactions. No significant change in temperature or pressure was found by TEPCO, so there was no sign of large-scale criticality. The reactor-cooling was continued, but TEPCO would examine the situation at reactor 1 and 3 also. Professor Koji Okamoto of the University of Tokyo Graduate School made the comment that localized and temporary fission might still happen, and that the melted fuel could undergo fission, but the fuel was probably scattered around. Neutrons from radioactive materials could react with the uranium fuel and other substances. Self-sustaining chain reactions were unlikely, thanks to the huge amounts of boric acid that were poured into the reactor. According to Okamoto, these neutrons should be closely monitored to make sure fission did not happen, because when the fission-reactions were not controlled, it would be impossible to reach a state of "cold-shutdown". Therefore, it was needed to locate all molten fuel in and outside the reactor-vessel.

On 3 November 2011 TEPCO said that the tiny amounts of xenon-135 detected in the reactor's containment vessel atmosphere came from spontaneous nuclear fission with curium-242 and curium-244, substances that were present in the nuclear fuel. A critical fission would have caused much higher concentrations of xenon isotopes. These reactions would occur constantly, and did not lead to criticality in the melted fuel of reactor 2. All assessments would be sent to NISA for reevaluation.

The detection of xenon on the afternoon of 1 November by TEPCO was reported to NISA in the night. The next day, 2 November just past 7 a.m., NISA informed the Prime Minister Yoshihiko Noda's secretary about the possibility of critical reactions in reactor 2. Two hours later at 9 a.m. prime minister Edano learned the news. At a press-conference, the Chief Cabinet Secretary Osamu Fujimura revealed that Minister of Economy, Trade and Industry Yukio Edano sent a strong reprimand to Hiroyuki Fukano, the chief of NISA, because NISA failed to report the incident immediately to both himself and the Prime Minister's Office, and that NISA waited almost a day after the find was done. Fujimura said, "I have been told that NISA decided not to report the incident until the following morning because the agency didn't believe it was a dangerous situation."

=== Radioactive pollution of groundwater ===
On 27 July 2013 was announced that extremely high levels of tritium and cesium were found in a pit containing about 5000 cubic meters of water on the seaside of the unit 2 reactor building. 8.7 million becquerels/liter Tritium was found and 2.35 billion becquerels/liter cesium. The NRA was concerned that leaks from this place could cause the high tritium levels in sea, and that there was still water flowing from the reactor into the turbine building into the pit. But TEPCO thought that this pollution was there from the first days in 2011, and stayed there. Nevertheless, TEPCO would control the site for leaks, and seal the soil around the pit.

=== 2017 Investigation of unit 2's containment in relation to elevated levels of radiation ===
On 30 January, TEPCO inserted a camera into the unit 2 containment system to investigate the region underneath the reactor vessel. TEPCO was able to estimate radiation levels of 530 Sv/hr, the highest level measured since the March 2011 accident when the previous high was measured at 73 Sv/hr. This does not represent an increase in radiation at the reactor, but rather is the first measurement taken in the containment vessel at this location. This investigation provided visual evidence that the core melt partially breached the reactor vessel. A 1x1 meter hole in the grating of the undervessel Control Rod Drive inspection platform was identified along with various deposits of core debris and sediment. TEPCO is using this information to help plan an upcoming robot entry to the under-vessel region of the concrete-floored containment. These radiation levels are indicative of the presence of corium.

== See also ==
- List of civilian nuclear accidents
- Lists of nuclear disasters and radioactive incidents
- Timeline of the Fukushima Daiichi nuclear disaster
- Comparison of Fukushima and Chernobyl nuclear accidents
