= Comparison of Chernobyl and other radioactivity releases =

This article compares the radioactivity release and decay from the Chernobyl disaster with various other events which involved a release of uncontrolled radioactivity.

== Chernobyl compared to background radiation ==
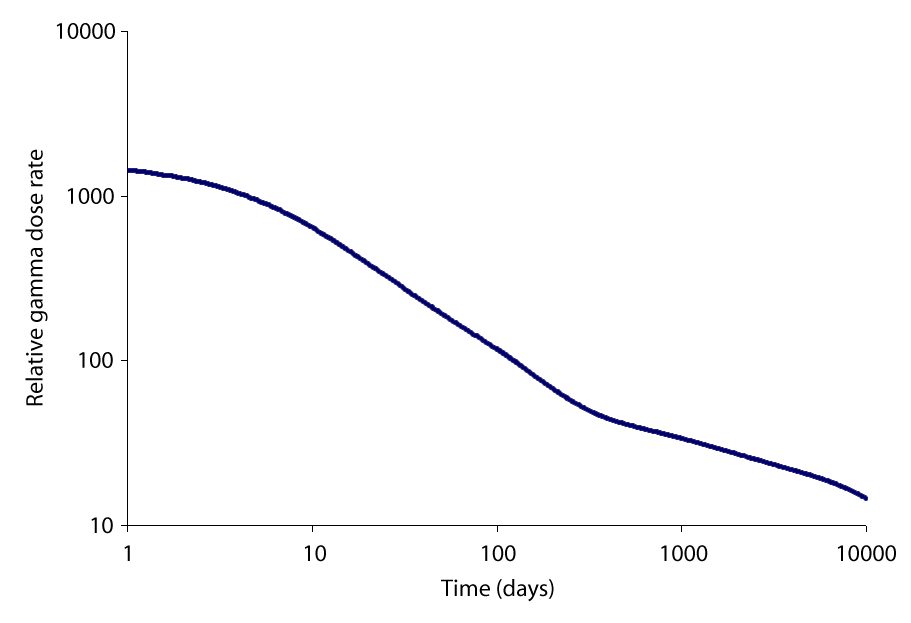
The external relative gamma dose for a person in the open near the Chernobyl disaster site. The intermediate-lived fission products like Cs-137 contribute nearly all of the gamma dose now after a number of decades have passed, see opposite.

The relative contributions of the major nuclides to the radioactive contamination of the air after the accident. Drawn using data from the OECD report and the second edition of 'The radiochemical manual'.

Natural sources of radiation are prevalent in the environment, and come from cosmic rays, food sources (bananas have a particularly high source due to potassium-40 but all foods contain carbon and thereby carbon-14), radon gas, granite and other dense rocks, and others. The banana equivalent dose is sometimes used in science communication to visualize different levels of ionizing radiation. The collective radiation background dose for natural sources in Europe is about 500,000 man-Sieverts per year. The total dose from Chernobyl is estimated at 80,000 man-sieverts, or roughly 1/6 as much. However, some individuals, particularly in areas adjacent to the reactor, received massively higher doses.

Chernobyl's radiation was detectable across Western Europe. Average doses received ranged from 0.02 mrem (Portugal) to 38 mrem (portions of Germany).

== Chernobyl compared with an atomic bomb ==
Far fewer people died as an immediate result of the Chernobyl event than the immediate deaths from radiation at Hiroshima. Chernobyl is eventually predicted to result in up to 4,000 total deaths from cancer, sometime in the future, according to the WHO and create around 41,000 excess cancer according to the International Journal of Cancer, with, depending on treatment, not all cancers resulting in death. Due to the differences in half-life, the different radioactive fission products undergo exponential decay at different rates. Hence the isotopic signature of an event where more than one radioisotope is involved will change with time.

"Compared with other nuclear events: The Chernobyl explosion put 400 times more radioactive material into the Earth's atmosphere than the atomic bomb dropped on Hiroshima; atomic weapons tests conducted in the 1950s and 1960s all together are estimated to have put some 100 to 1,000 times more radioactive material into the atmosphere than the Chernobyl accident."

The radioactivity released at Chernobyl tended to be more long-lived than that released by a bomb detonation hence it is not possible to draw a simple comparison between the two events. Also, a dose of radiation spread over many years (as is the case with Chernobyl) is much less harmful than the same dose received over a short period.

The relative size of the Chernobyl release when compared with the release due to a hypothetical ground burst of a bomb similar to the Fat Man device dropped on Nagasaki.

Isotope	Ratio between the release due to the Fat Man bomb and the Chernobyl accident
^{90}Sr	1:87
^{137}Cs	1:890
^{131}I	1:25
^{133}Xe	1:31

A comparison of the gamma dose rates due to the Chernobyl accident and the hypothetical nuclear weapon.

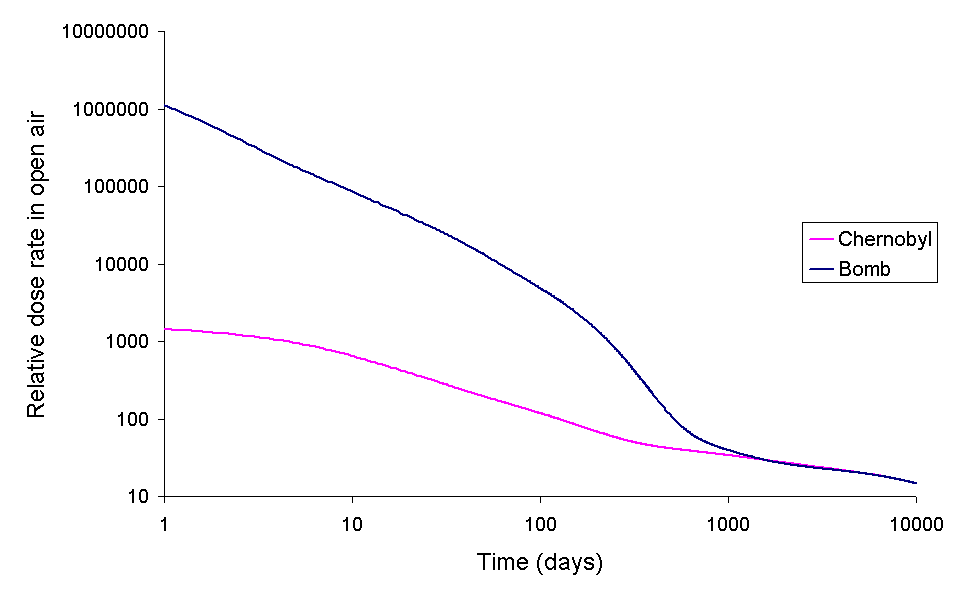
Normalized to the same Cs-137 level. (logarithmic scale).

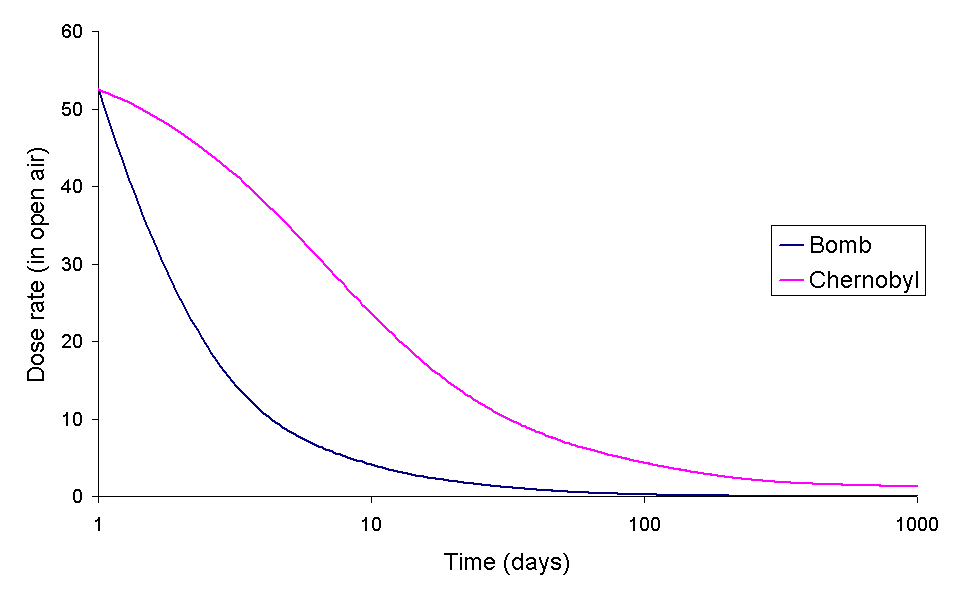
Normalized to the same dose rate for day one.

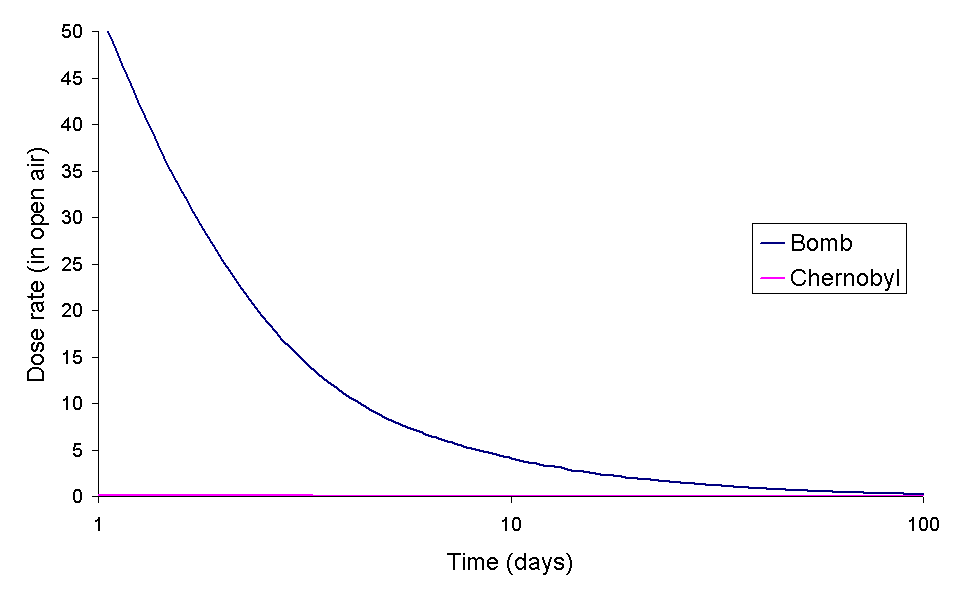
Normalized to the same Cs-137 level (dose rate on day 10000).

The graph of dose rate as a function of time for the bomb fallout was created using a method similar to that of T. Imanaka, S. Fukutani, M. Yamamoto, A. Sakaguchi and M. Hoshi, J. Radiation Research, 2006, 47, Suppl A121-A127. The graph exhibits the same shape as that obtained in the paper. The bomb fallout graph is for a ground burst of an implosion-based plutonium bomb which has a depleted uranium tamper. The fission was assumed to have been caused by 1 MeV neutrons and 20% occurred in the ^{238}U tamper of the bomb. It was assumed, for the sake of simplicity, that no plume separation of the isotopes occurred between the detonation and the deposit of radioactivity. The following gamma-emitting isotopes are modeled ^{131}I, ^{133}I, ^{132}Te, ^{133}I, ^{135}I, ^{140}Ba, ^{95}Zr, ^{97}Zr, ^{99}Mo, ^{99m}Tc, ^{103}Ru, ^{105}Ru, ^{106}Ru, ^{142}La, ^{143}Ce, ^{137}Cs, ^{91}Y, ^{91}Sr, ^{92}Sr, ^{128}Sb, and ^{129}Sb. The graph ignores the effects of beta emission and shielding. The data for the isotopes was obtained from the Korean table of the isotopes. The graphs for the Chernobyl accident were computed by an analogous method. Note that in the event of a low altitude or ground burst nuclear detonation that fractionation of the volatile and non volatile radionuclides occurs. Also during the Chernobyl accident, the ratio between the different elements released by the accident changed as a function of time.

A ground burst of a nuclear weapon creates considerably more local deposited fallout than the air bursts used at Hiroshima or Nagasaki. This is due in part to neutron activation of ground soil and greater amounts of soil being sucked into the nuclear fireball in a ground burst than in a high air burst. In the above, neutron activation is neglected, and only the fission product fraction of the total activity resulting from the ground burst is shown.

== Chernobyl compared with Tomsk-7 ==
The release of radioactivity which occurred at Tomsk-7 (an industrial nuclear complex located in Seversk rather than the city of Tomsk) in 1993, is another comparison with the Chernobyl release. During reprocessing activities, some of the feed for the second cycle (medium active part) of the PUREX process escaped in an accident involving red oil. According to the IAEA it was estimated that the following isotopes were released from the reaction vessel:

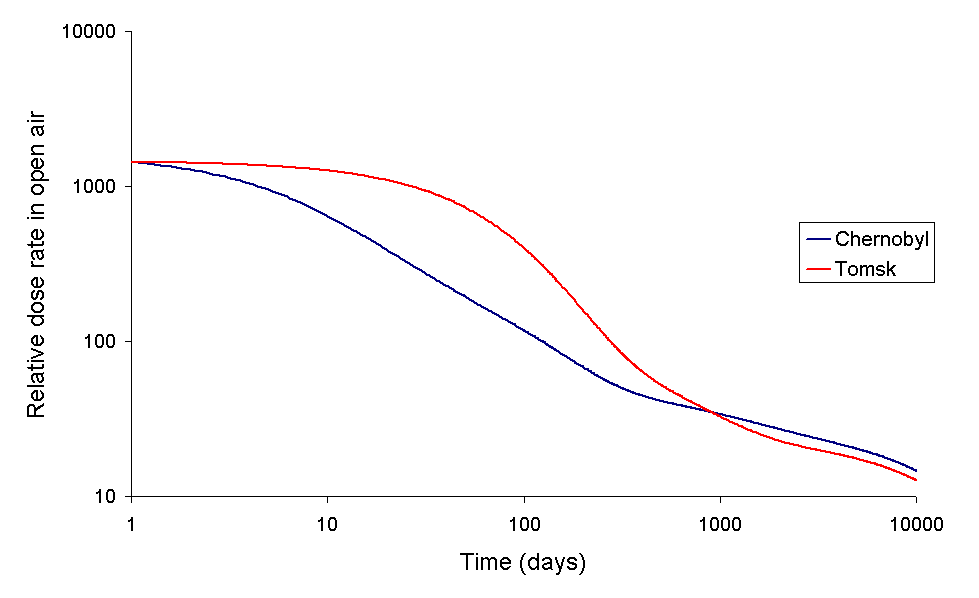
Normalized to the same first day dose rate. (logarithmic scale).

- ^{106}Ru 7.9 TBq
- ^{103}Ru 340 GBq
- ^{95}Nb 11.2 TBq
- ^{95}Zr 5.1 TBq
- ^{137}Cs 505 GBq (estimated from the IAEA data)
- ^{141}Ce 370 GBq
- ^{144}Ce 240 GBq
- ^{125}Sb 100 GBq
- ^{239}Pu 5.2 GBq

The very short-lived isotopes such as ^{140}Ba and ^{131}I were absent from this mixture, and the long-lived ^{137}Cs was at a small concentration. This is because it is not able to enter the tributyl phosphate/hydrocarbon organic phase used in the first liquid-liquid extraction cycle of the PUREX process. The second cycle is normally to clean up the uranium and plutonium product. In the PUREX process, some zirconium, technetium, and other elements are extracted by the tributyl phosphate. Due to the radiation induced degradation of tributyl phosphate, the first cycle organic phase is always contaminated with ruthenium (later extracted by dibutyl hydrogen phosphate). Because the very short-lived radioisotopes and the relatively long-lived caesium isotopes are either absent or in low concentrations, the shape of the dose rate vs. time graph is different from Chernobyl, both for short times and long times after the accident.

The size of the radioactive release at Tomsk-7 was much smaller, and while it caused moderate environmental contamination, it did not cause any early deaths.

== Chernobyl compared to Fukushima Daiichi ==
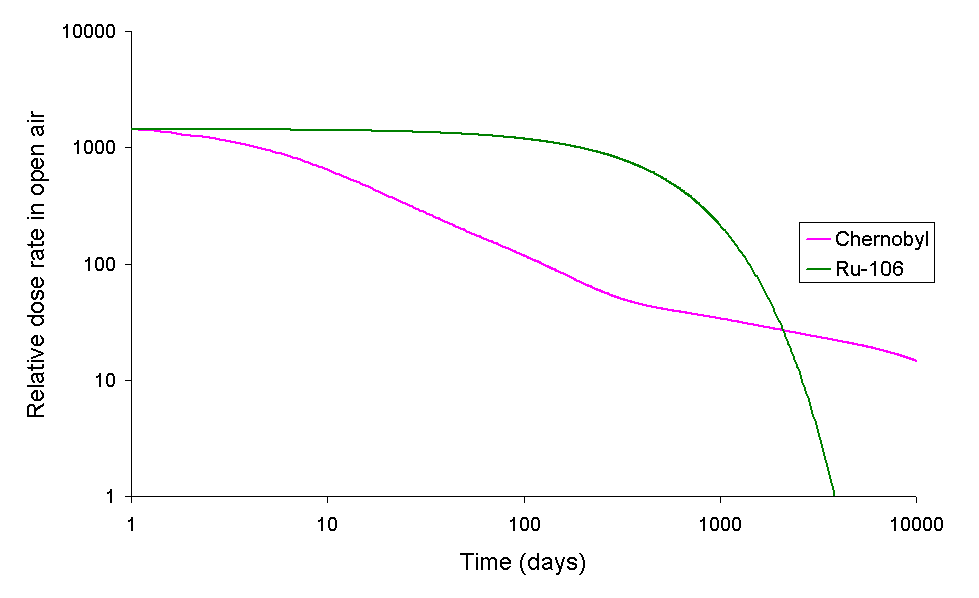
Normalized to the same first day dose rate. (logarithmic scale).

== Chernobyl compared with the Goiânia accident ==
While both events released ^{137}Cs, the isotopic signature for the Goiânia accident was much simpler. It was a single isotope which has a half-life of about 30 years. To show how the activity vs. time graph for a single isotope differs from the dose rate due to Chernobyl (in the open air), the adjacent chart is shown with calculated data for a hypothetical release of ^{106}Ru.

== Chernobyl compared with the Three Mile Island accident ==
Three Mile Island-2 was an accident of a completely different type from Chernobyl. However, both accidents have vague similarities.

Chernobyl was a design flaw-caused power excursion causing a steam explosion resulting in a graphite fire, uncontained, which lofted radioactive smoke high into the atmosphere; TMI was a slow, undetected leak – caused by the technical malfunction of a pilot-operated relief valve – which lowered the water level around the nuclear fuel, resulting in over a third of it shattering when refilled rapidly with coolant.

Similar to Chernobyl, operator error played a role but did not directly cause the accident. Both accidents had grueling and costly cleanup efforts. Chernobyl and TMI's unaffected reactors were restarted and continued operation until 2000 and 2019, respectively.

Unlike Chernobyl, TMI-2's reactor vessel did not fail and contained almost all of the radioactive material. Containment at TMI was not breached. On the day of the accident, a small "hydrogen burn" occurred inside the reactor building, but it was not enough to affect normal operation of the reactor.

Following the accident, an estimated 44,000 Ci (1,600,000 GBq) (curies) of radioactive gases – particularly Krypton-85 – from the leak were vented into the atmosphere through specially designed filters under operator control. A government report concluded that the accident caused no increase in cancer rates for local residents.

== Chernobyl compared with criticality accidents ==
During the time between the start of the Manhattan Project and the present day, a series of accidents have occurred in which nuclear criticality has played a central role. The criticality accidents may be divided into two classes. For more details see nuclear and radiation accidents. A review of the topic was published in 2000, "A Review of Criticality Accidents" by Los Alamos National Laboratory (Report LA-13638), May 2000. Coverage includes United States, Russia, United Kingdom, and Japan. Also available at this page, which also tries to track down documents referenced in the report.

- Press release on a report on criticality accidents from Los Alamos National Laboratory
- List of radiation accidents
- U.S. report from 1971 on criticality accidents to date

=== Process accidents ===
In the first class (process accidents) during the processing of fissile material, accidents have occurred when a critical mass has been created by accident. For instance at Charlestown, Rhode Island, United States, on July 24, 1964, one death occurred. At Tokaimura, Japan, nuclear fuel reprocessing plant, on September 30, 1999, two deaths and one non fatal overexposure occurred as result of accidents where too much fissile matter was placed in a vessel. Radioactivity was released as a result of the Tokaimura accident. The building in which the accident occurred was not designed as a containment building, yet it was able to retard the spread of radioactivity. Because the temperature rise in the nuclear reaction vessel was small, the majority of the fission products remained in the vessel.

These accidents tend to lead to very high doses due to direct irradiation of the workers within the site, but due to the inverse square law the dose suffered by members of the general public tends to be very small. Also very little environmental contamination normally occurs as a result of these accidents.

=== Reactor accidents ===
In this type of accident a reactor or other critical assembly releases far more fission power than was expected, or it becomes critical at the wrong moment in time. The series of examples of such events include one in an experimental facility in Buenos Aires, Argentina, on September 23, 1983 (one death), and during the Manhattan Project several people were irradiated (two, Harry Daghlian and Louis Slotin, were irradiated fatally) during "tickling the dragon's tail" experiments. These accidents tend to lead to very high doses due to direct irradiation of the workers within the site, but due to the inverse square law the dose suffered by members of the general public tends to be very small. Also, very little environmental contamination normally occurs as a result of these accidents. For instance, at Sarov the radioactivity remained confined to within the actinide metal objects which were part of the experimental system, according to the IAEA report (2001). Even the SL-1 accident (RIA, power surge in an experimental nuclear reactor in Idaho, 1961) failed to release much radioactivity outside the building in which it occurred.

== See also ==
- Church Rock uranium mill spill
- Comparison of Fukushima and Chernobyl nuclear accidents
- Effects of the Chernobyl disaster
- Fukushima nuclear accident
- Mayak explosion
- International Nuclear Event Scale
- Nuclear power debate
- List of Chernobyl-related articles
- Chernobyl
