= Fukushima Daiichi units 4, 5 and 6 =

Status of units 4, 5, and 6 during the Fukushima nuclear disaster

Coordinates: 37.427338°N 141.032407°E

When the Fukushima Daiichi nuclear disaster began on 11 March 2011, reactor units 4, 5 and 6 were all shut down. An explosion damaged unit 4 four days after the 2011 Tōhoku earthquake and tsunami. Damages from the earthquake and tsunami on units 5 and 6 are relatively minor.

The unit 4 was shut down and all fuel rods had been transferred to the spent fuel pool on an upper floor of the reactor building. On 15 March, an explosion damaged the fourth floor rooftop area of the unit 4 reactor; the source of the explosion is still unknown, although it is speculated to be due to hydrogen generation in the spent fuel pool. Japan's nuclear safety agency NISA reported two large holes in a wall of the outer building of unit 4 after the explosion. It was reported that water in the spent fuel pool might be boiling. Radiation inside the unit 4 control room prevented workers from staying there permanently. Visual inspection of the spent fuel pool of reactor 4 on 30 April showed that there was no significant visible damage to the fuel rods in the pool.

Reactors 5 and 6 were also shut down when the earthquake struck although, unlike reactor 4, they were still fueled. The reactors have been closely monitored, as cooling processes were not functioning well.

== Unit 4 Reactor ==
Units 1 through 4 at the plant

At the time of the earthquake, Unit 4 had been shut down for shroud replacement and refueling since 29 November 2010. All 548 fuel assemblies had been transferred in December 2010 from the reactor to the spent fuel pool on an upper floor of the reactor building where they were held in racks containing boron to damp down any nuclear reaction. The pool is used to store rods for some time after removal from the reactor and contains 1,331 rods. Recently active fuel rods produce more decay heat than older ones. At 4 pm JST on Monday 14 March, water in the pool had reached a temperature of 84 °C compared to a normal value of 40–50 °C. The IAEA was advised that the temperature value remained 84 °C at 7 pm JST on 15 March. The temperature in the pool remained relatively constant until 30 July, when a closed circuit cooling system was commissioned. On 11 April, a fire broke out at Unit 4.

=== Explosion ===
At approximately 6 am JST on 15 March, an explosion damaged the 4th floor rooftop area of the Unit 4 reactor as well as part of the adjacent Unit 3. The explosion is thought to be caused by the ignition of hydrogen that had accumulated near the spent fuel pond, the hydrogen was initially thought to have come from the stored fuel rods, but later, TEPCO believed the hydrogen came from Unit 3. A hand-written summary of a conference call, taken by an aide to then-Nuclear Regulatory Commission chairman Gregory Jazcko, stated that fuel could have been ejected from the Unit 4 spent fuel pond during this explosion; this was later found to be in error. Later reports that the Unit 4 spent fuel pool had caught fire were found to be erroneous; later reports clarified that the fire did not involve the fuel pool. Current versions of the IAEA report do not mention a fire (as of 6/2014, the logs of the fuel transfer process from the Unit 4 spent fuel pool to the common fuel pool indicate steady progress with no fuel damage reported). As radiation levels rose, some of the employees still at the plant were evacuated. On the morning of 15 March, Secretary Edano announced that according to the TEPCO, radiation dose equivalent rates measured from the Unit 4 reached 100 mSv/h. Edano said there was no continued release of "high radiation".

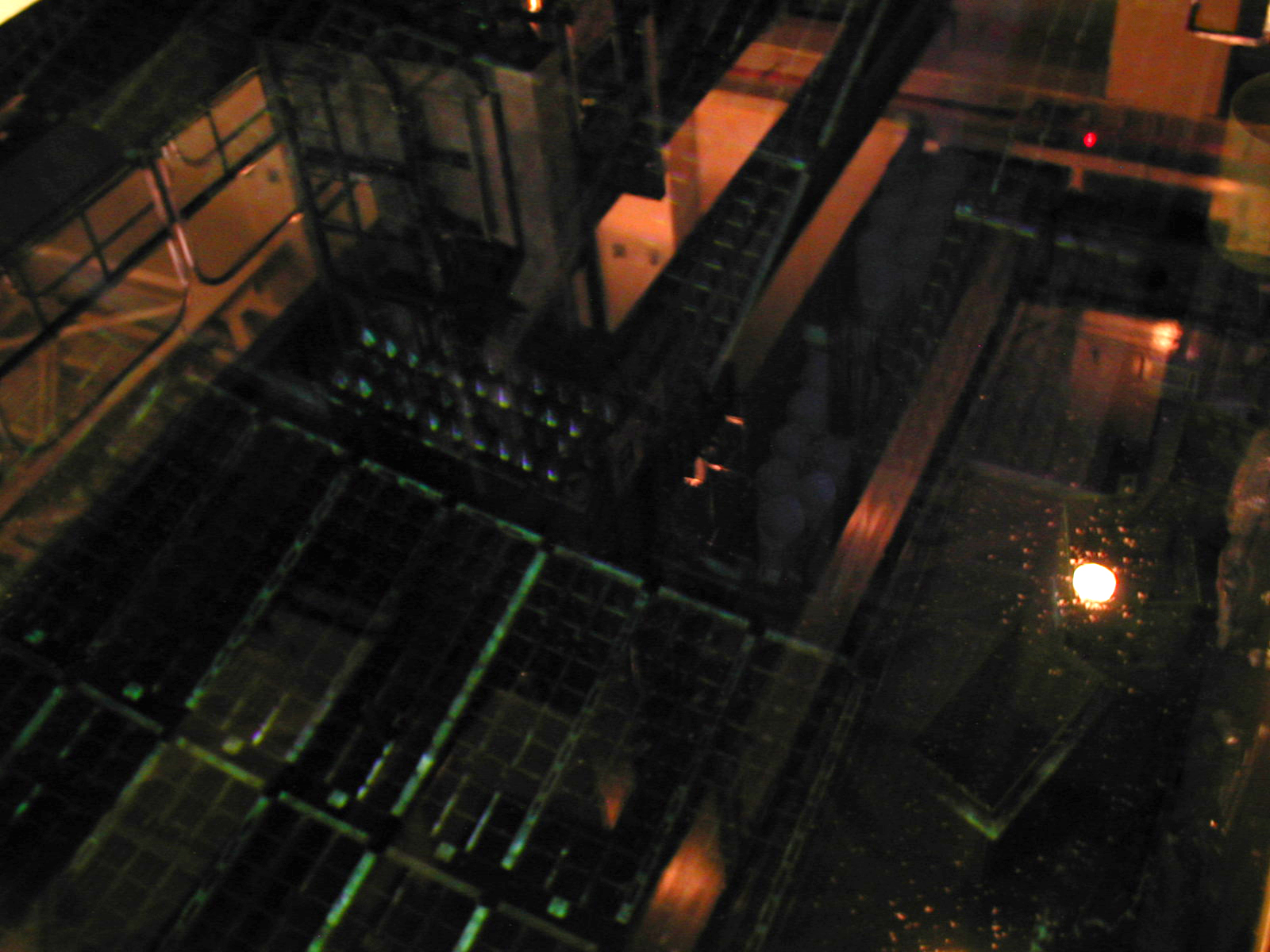
A Fukushima spent fuel pool in the year 1999 (the view is obstructed by the reflection of the loading crane on the water surface).

Japan's nuclear safety agency NISA reported two holes, each 8 meters square, or 64 m^{2} (690 sq ft), in a wall of the outer building of Unit 4 after the explosion. At 5:48 pm it was reported that water in the spent fuel pool might be boiling. By 9:13 pm on 15 March, radiation inside the Unit 4 control room prevented workers from staying there permanently. Seventy staff remained at the plant, while 800 had been evacuated. By 10:30 pm TEPCO was reportedly unable to pour water into the spent fuel pool. By 10:50 pm the company was considering using helicopters to drop water, but this was postponed because of concerns over safety and effectiveness, and the use of high-pressure fire hoses was considered instead.

A fire was discovered at 5:45 am JST on 16 March in the northwest corner of the reactor building by a worker taking batteries to the central control room of Unit 4. This was reported to the authorities, but on further inspection at 6:15 am no fire was found. Other reports stated that the fire was under control. At 11:57 am, TEPCO released a photograph showing "a large portion of the building's outer wall has collapsed". Technicians considered spraying boric acid on the building from a helicopter.

=== Structural damage of reactor building no. 4 ===
On 24 June 2012 TEPCO revealed that some exterior walls were slightly out of vertical in reactor building no.4, due to the hydrogen explosion in March 2011. Further investigations showed damage in various parts of the building structures at the west and south side. At the third floor a wall was found to be leaning 4.6 centimeters out of vertical. All deviations were within legal limits, and the walls were strong enough to withstand an earthquake. TEPCO noted that the building was safe, because these variations were all found in the outer walls, and the spent fuel pool was supported by pillars and other structures.

=== Spent fuel pool ===
On 16 March, the chairman of United States Nuclear Regulatory Commission (NRC), Gregory Jaczko, said in Congressional testimony that the NRC believed all of the water in the spent fuel pool had boiled dry. Japanese nuclear authorities and TEPCO contradicted this report, but later in the day Jaczko stood by his claim, saying it had been confirmed by sources in Japan. At 1 pm TEPCO said that helicopter observation indicated that the pool had not boiled off. The French Institut de Radioprotection et de Sûreté Nucléaire (IRSN) agreed, stating that helicopter crews diverted planned water dumps to Unit 3 on the basis of their visual inspection of Unit 4.

At approximately 2:30 pm on 16 March, TEPCO announced that the storage pool, located outside the Unit 4 containment area, might be boiling. Around 8 pm JST, it was then planned to use a police water cannon to spray water on Unit 4.

On 18 March, it was reported that water sprayed into the spent fuel pool was disappearing faster than evaporation could explain, suggesting leakage. SDF military trucks sprayed water onto the building to try to replenish the pool on 20 March. On 22 March, the Australian military flew in Bechtel-owned robotic equipment for remote spraying and viewing of the pool. The Australian reported this would give the first clear view of the pool in the "most dangerous" of the reactor buildings.

The IAEA reported, "From 22 March to 25 March 130 to 150 tonnes of seawater were poured into the spent fuel pool each day using a concrete pump equipped with a long articulated arm. Seawater was also poured in through spent fuel cooling system from 9:05 pm UTC 24 March to 01:20 25 March. White smoke was still being observed coming from the reactor building as of 11 pm UTC 25 March." On 29 March, the seawater was changed to fresh water.

Cumulative amount of cooling water, 20 March to 28 May

Analysis of spent fuel pool water collected on 12 April suggests that while some of the 1535 fuel assemblies stored there may have been damaged, the majority of the stored fuel assemblies are intact based on measured radiation levels. TEPCO further stated that "the fuel rods in the Unit 4 pool had released caesium-134 and −137 in the process of being damaged", and that TEPCO would "need to continue monitoring it". On 13 April, TEPCO reported that the temperature of the spent fuel pool had increased to 90 °C, and that the radiation level 6 meters above the pool had reached 84 mSv/h. The spike was later attributed to a failure to properly keep the spent fuel pool covered in water. As of 25 April, TEPCO was still pumping between 70 and 210 tons of water into the pool, varying the amounts depending on the temperature in the pool. TEPCO also reported that it was attempting to minimize the amount of water added to the pool for fear "the weight of the water could weaken the reactor building". On 28 April, TEPCO announced it believed that water was not leaking from the pool but only evaporating. TEPCO based its belief on calculations that the heat generated by the spent fuel stored in the pool would be expected to evaporate 140 to 210 tons of water daily, in line with the amount of replacement water it adds. On 9 May, TEPCO began work to install a supporting structure for the Unit 4 spent fuel pool, due to the concerns that explosions could have weakened the structure.

On 11 June, it was discovered that the water level in the spent fuel pool was only one third of normal, and only part of the fuel rods were covered with water. This was probably the cause of the high radiation levels measured. This pool has also been used to dump equipment. On Sunday 19 June, the pool was refilled, to minimize the radiation and making it possible to work again at this place. On 21 June, the first stage of strengthening at the second floor in the building under the pool was finished: 32 steel columns 8 meters long with a weight of 40 tons each were placed at the second floor. By 30 July, the concreting of the supporting columns was completed.

From 16 June, water injection to the spent fuel pool was switched from using the concrete pumping vehicle to an alternative water injection line.

On 31 July, the spent fuel pool was switched from the water-injection cooling system, to a circulatory cooling system.

On 31 January 2012, six liters of radioactive water (35.500 becquerels per liter) leaked from the spent fuel pool of reactor 4 onto the floor in the building from a broken pipe. The leakage was stopped after a valve was closed, and was thought to have been caused by the cold weather. The next day (1 February 2012), TEPCO released an even higher figure: 8500 liters were leaked after a pipe was dropped off after the water inside had turned into ice. The leakage appeared to have started at around 5 p.m. on 31 January 2012. This water was contaminated with radioactive isotopes, because it was mixed with water that was in contact with the fuel rods from the spent-fuel pool. TEPCO made plans to check whether there were similar cases in the other damaged reactor buildings.

On 30 June 2012 around 6:25 hours local time, an alarm went off, and the cooling system of the spent fuel pool halted. At that time, the temperature was 33.3 degrees Celsius; no leakage of radioactive contaminated water was reported. On 4 June, a similar situation caused the cooling to be halted. On 1 July shortly after 3 p.m. the cooling was resumed, the water temperature of the pool having risen to 42.9 °C. TEPCO had feared that the temperature could reach 65 °C, the upper limit designated in safety regulations. The cause of the troubles was laid in some parts of the emergency power system, and these were to be replaced.

On 18 March 2013 at 6:57 p.m., the cooling system for the spent fuel pools of the No. 1, 3 and 4 reactors stopped, after the electricity instantaneously went out at the plant's accident response center. TEPCO suspects that the problem was situated in one makeshift power switchboard controlling the cooling system. The injection of water into the Nos. 1, 2 and 3 reactors was not affected. According to TEPCO, restoring the cooling system of the spent fuel pool of reactor No. 4 had the "highest priority", because the number of fuel assemblies stored in that tank was larger than in the pools of unit 1, 2 and 3. On 19 March at 10 a.m., the temperatures ranged between 15.9 C and 30.5 C, and it would take about four days until the temperature of the water inside the No. 4 spent fuel pool reaches the upper safety limit of 65 C. TEPCO was prepared to inject water into the pool whenever needed in case the water warmed up and started to evaporate. On 19 March around 1:20 p.m., one of the two lines forming the cooling system of the No. 4 spent fuel pool was restored. Around 8 p.m. TEPCO was expecting to get the other line in operation. The cooling system of the No. 1 spent fuel pool was put back in action at 2:20 p.m. The power loss caused anxiety and questions among residents of the region. The news was communicated by the Nuclear Regulation Authority around three hours after the incident happened. On 22 March 2013, the evacuation zones were to be reclassified, and some residents would be allowed to make day trips to their homes. Some people thought that all was under control, and others with little children were afraid for yet another evacuation. Electricity went out simultaneously at nine facilities of the plant in total, a filter system to remove radioactive materials from cooling water for the reactors, and a cooling system for yet another pool were affected too. TEPCO admitted, that this was the first occasion that such a power failure happened at so critical facilities at the site since the plant was brought under control in December 2011. On 20 March before 1:00 a.m. all systems were online again. The cooling system of pool no. 4 was restored as last. TEPCO blamed a provisional power switchboard to be the cause of the troubles. According to TEPCO, this was the last remaining makeshift power switchboard at the plant, installed after the nuclear crisis. Criticism was there from the central and prefectural government, the late announcement three hours after the power loss had caused "significant anxiety" among local people. TEPCO promised that it would seek to communicate relevant information more quickly on issues that could stir public concern. During the investigation to find the cause of the power loss, a 6-inch rat was found electrocuted near a switch board. Further investigations were needed to find out whether this was the only cause.

Although for the reactor's backup systems were available, the power loss proved that that was not the case for the spent fuel pools. No measures had been taken to prevent small animals entering this important equipment located at the back of a truck in open air. On 21 March, TEPCO apologized for the delay in reporting the power loss, and for not contacting the media, and promised to improve on this. The NRA decided, that it would speed up the installment of back-up power supply systems, and more durable and reliable systems. A meeting of experts was announced for 29 March 2013 to discuss the TEPCO report on the subject. Serious criticism came from the Japanese government; TEPCO was instructed to install multiple power supplies, and to do more to restore public confidence in the safety of the plant. Chief Cabinet Secretary Yoshihide Suga said at a press conference, that TEPCO was ordered to improve its risk management, that TEPCO had not promptly informed the authorities, and that TEPCO's handling of the power failure had greatly damaged public trust in the company.

=== Concern about criticality in the spent fuel pool ===
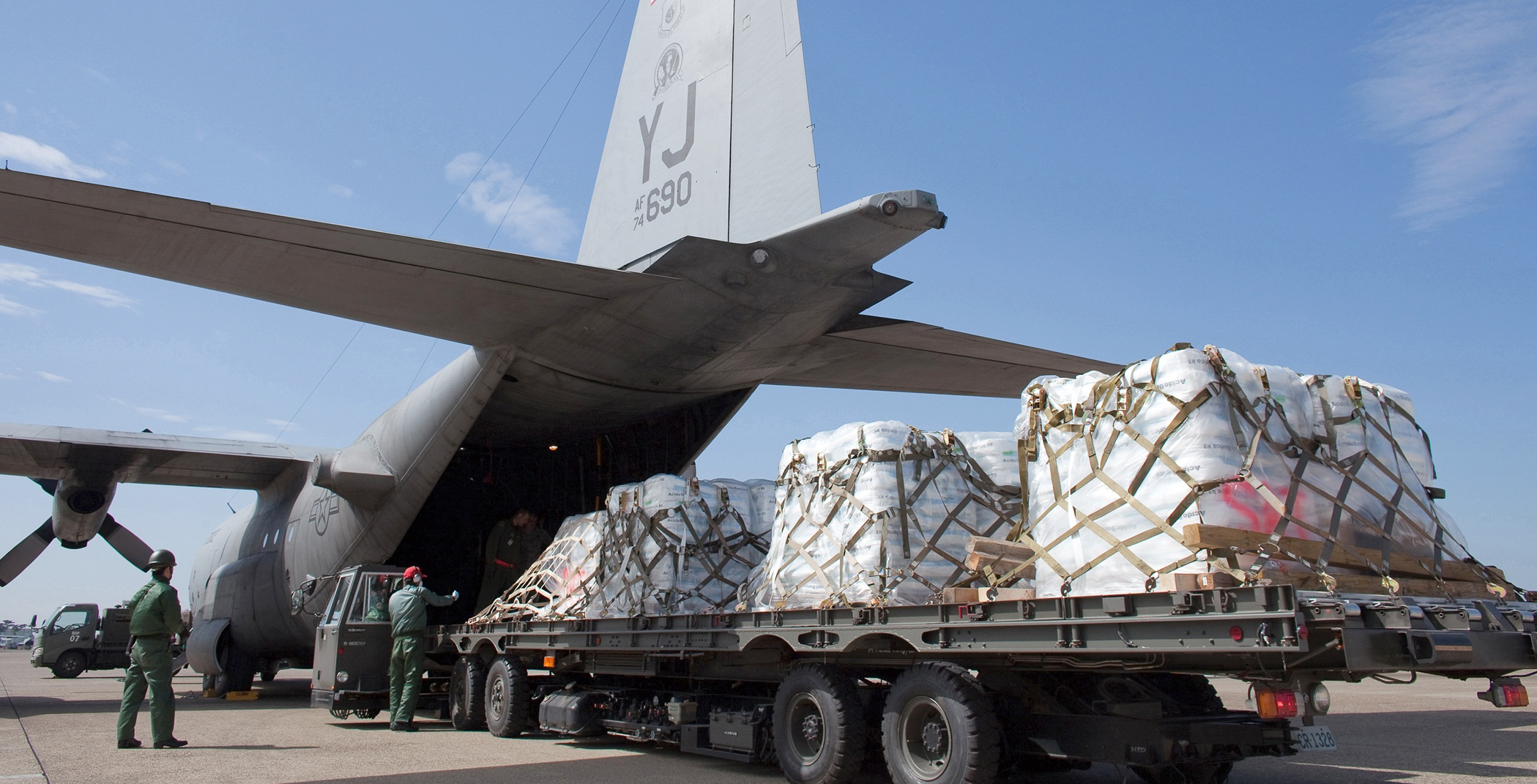
Boric acid is airlifted to Fukushima for addition to cooling water.

Despite widely voiced concerns, the evidence suggests that the spent fuel pool at Unit 4 did not approach criticality at any stage.

==== Boron injection ====
Officials are reported to have considered insertion or targeted aerial dropping of boric acid, boronated plastic beads or boron carbide pellets into the spent fuel pools to absorb neutrons. France flew 95 tonnes of boron to Japan on 17 March 2011 and the US provided 9 tons. Neutron absorbing boric acid has been add to water injected into the reactor cores, but is unclear if boron was included with the spraying of spent fuel pools (SFP)s.

==== Visual inspection ====
Visual inspection of the spent fuel rod pool on Reactor 4 on 30 April 2011 showed that there is no significant visible damage to the fuel rods in the pool.

==== Fuel Rods Removed ====
On 22 December 2014, TEPCO crews completed the removal of all fuel assemblies, and the spent fuel pool of Reactor 4 no longer contained any stored fuel rods. The majority of the spent fuel assemblies were moved to the common spent fuel pool while some of the unused fuel assemblies were moved to the spent fuel pool of Unit 6.

== Units 5 and 6 ==
Both reactors were offline at the time the earthquake struck (Reactor 5 had been shut down on 3 January 2011 and Reactor 6 on 14 August 2010), although they were still fueled, unlike Reactor 4 where the fuel rods had been removed prior to the earthquake.

Government spokesman Edano stated on 15 March that Reactors 5 and 6 were being closely monitored, as cooling processes were not functioning well. At 9:16 am JST, the removal of roof panels from reactor buildings 5 and 6 was being considered in order to allow any hydrogen build-up to escape. At 9 pm on 15 March, water levels in Unit 5 were reported to be 2 m above fuel rods, but had fallen 40 cm in 5 hours. Published water temperatures on 18 March showed 182 °C inside Reactor 5 and 161 °C in Reactor 6.

On 17 March, Unit 6 was reported to have a single operational air-cooled diesel-generator as well as dry switchgear (inside the only GE Mark II reactor building) and this was to be used to power pumps in Unit 5 to run the Make-up Water Condensate System (MUWC) to supply more water. Preparations were made to inject water into the reactor pressure vessel once external power could be restored to the plant, as water levels in the reactors were considered to be declining. NISA reported that connections from the grid to all units was complete 20 March through new cables and transformers.

Information provided to the IAEA indicated that storage pool temperatures at both Units 5 and 6 remained steady around 60–68 °C between 7 pm JST 14 March and 9 pm JST 18 March, though rising slowly. On 18 March reactor water levels remained around 2 m above the top of fuel rods. It was confirmed that panels had been removed from the roofs of Units 5 and 6 to allow any hydrogen gas to escape. At 4:22 am on 19 March, the second unit of emergency generator A for Unit 6 was restarted which allowed operation of pump C of the residual heat removal system (RHR) in Unit 5 to cool the spent fuel storage pool and reactor core alternately. Later in the day, Pump B in Unit 6 was also restarted to allow cooling of the spent fuel pool and reactor core there. Crews had installed temporary submersible seawater pumps and hoses to supply cooling water to the residual heat removal system heat exchangers as the main seawater pumps were heavily damaged by the tsunami. Additionally, as there was heavy damage to electrical equipment in the basements from flooding, temporary power connections had to be made to the residual heat removal system main loop pumps. Temperature at Unit 5 pool decreased to 48 °C on 19 March 6 pm JST, and 37 °C on 20 March when Unit 6 pool temperature had fallen to 41 °C. On 20 March, NISA announced that both reactors had been returned to a condition of cold shutdown.

On 23 March, it was reported that the cooling pump at Reactor 5 stopped working when it was transferred from backup power to the grid supply. This was repaired and the cooling restarted approximately 24 hours later. RHR cooling in Unit 6 was switched to the permanent power supply on 25 March.

On 28 May, the temporary seawater cooling pump for Reactor 5 stopped, which was discovered by TEPCO at 21 local time. At that time, the temperature in the reactor was 68 °C, and in the spent fuel pool 41 °C. At 11 in the morning the following day the temperatures had risen to 92.2 °C and 45.7 °C. Cooling was restored at 12:49 pm.

On 24 June TEPCO completed repairs to the Reactor Building Equipment Cooling Water system of Unit 5 which removes heat from the main Fuel Pool Cooling and Clean-up system as well as other equipment. The fuel pool and reactor core are now being cooled simultaneously, the fuel pool by the Fuel Pool Cooling System and Equipment Cooling Water System and the reactor core by the Residual Heat Removal System. Previously the Residual Heat Removal System was alternately being switched between cooling the reactor core and fuel pool. On 16 September, the same was accomplished in Unit 6 and now the reactors and storage pools of both units are being cooled separately.

On 3 July in the morning, a crack in a polyvinyl hose - 30 centimeters long and 7 centimeters wide - was found around the outlet of a temporary pump for seawater. At 10 am the pump was shut off, the cooling system of reactor 5 was halted 15 minutes later. The polyvinyl pipe was replaced, and the cooling system was restarted at 1:45 pm. The temperature in the reactor rose some 5 degrees Celsius to 47.7 degrees Celsius. Constant tidal movements were probably the cause of the rupture of the pleated flexible tube. On 4 July TEPCO announced that all tubes and hoses used in the heat removal systems will be checked on possible weaknesses. Tubes like these, that were used to transfer highly radioactive water, did not require replacement because they were not bent at extreme angles. At 10:16 am on 15 July, TEPCO completed repairs to Pump B of the original Residual Heat Removal Seawater System of Unit 5. The original seawater system was severely damaged in the tsunami requiring the temporary seawater pumps and hoses to be installed which have proven to be leak prone. At 2:45 pm on 15 July, TEPCO began pumping seawater through the residual heat removal heat exchanger with the newly repaired pump.

== External Power ==
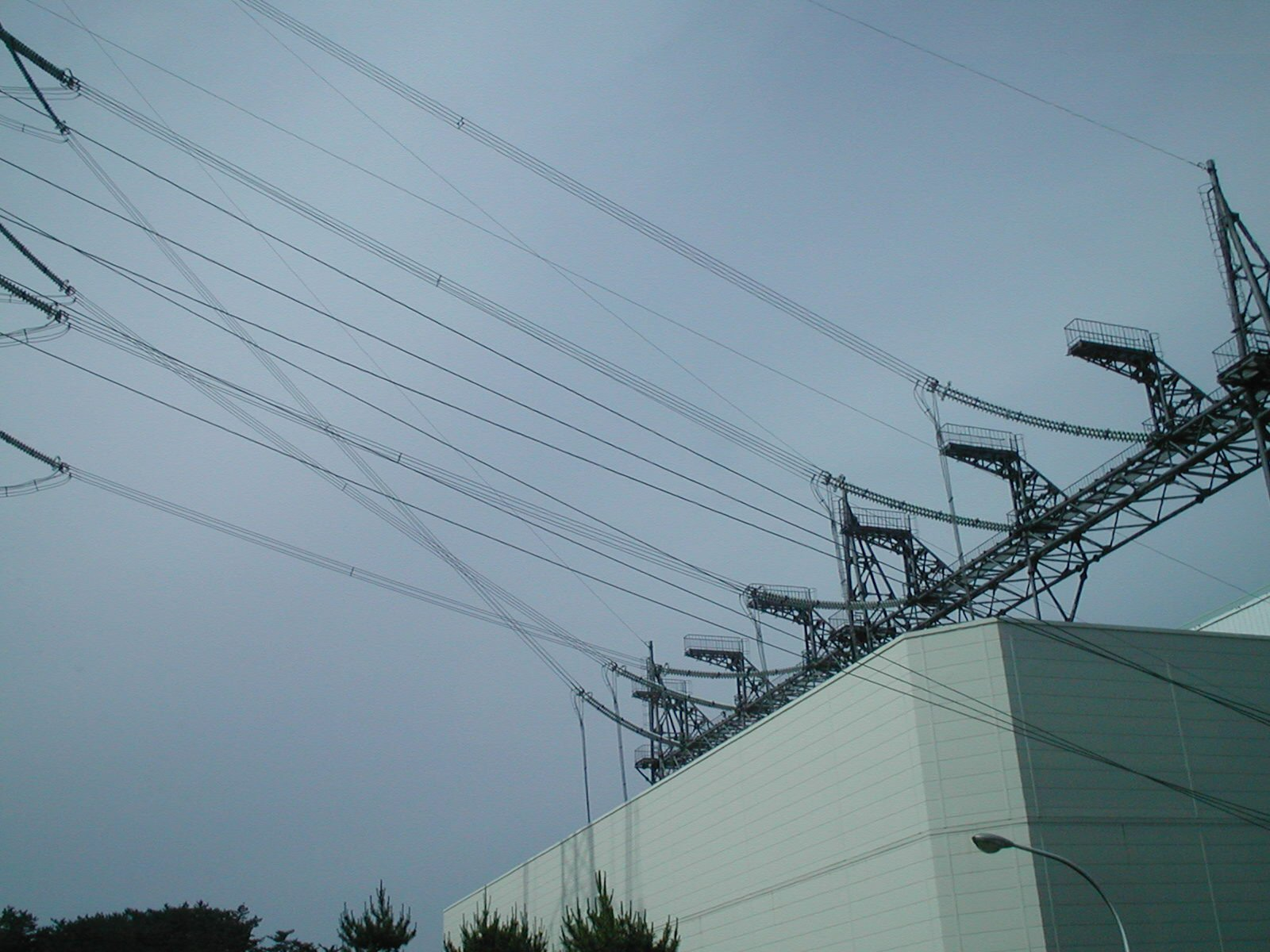
Unit 5&6 connection to the 500 kV Futaba Line (双葉線)

The Futaba lines remained energized during the earthquake, and tsunami. Damage to equipment in the plant substation prevented this power from being used.
