= Isolation condenser =

An isolation condenser (IC) or isolation condenser system is one of the injection systems in some nuclear plants (boiling water reactor safety systems).

== Emergency passive system ==
It is a passive system for cooling of some reactors (BWR/2, BWR/3 ..., and the (E)SBWR series) in nuclear production, located above containment in a pool of water open to atmosphere.

In operation, decay heat boils steam, which is drawn into the heat exchanger and condensed; then it falls by weight of gravity back into the reactor. This process keeps the cooling water in the reactor, making it unnecessary to use powered feedwater pumps. The water in the open pool slowly boils off, venting clean steam to the atmosphere. This makes it unnecessary to run mechanical systems to remove heat. Periodically, the pool must be refilled, a simple task for a fire truck. The (E)SBWR reactors provide three days' supply of water in the pool. Some older reactors also have IC systems, including Fukushima Dai-ichi reactor 1, however their water pools may not be as large.

Under normal conditions, the IC system is not activated, but the top of the IC condenser is connected to the reactor's steam lines through an open valve. Steam enters the IC condenser and condenses until it is filled with water. When the IC system is activated, a valve at the bottom of the IC condenser is opened which connects to a lower area on the reactor. The water falls to the reactor via gravity, allowing the condenser to fill with steam, which then condenses. This cycle runs continuously until the bottom valve is closed.

== Problems ==
In case of electricity failure, the valves close automatically, and operators have to open them manually, which can be difficult in case an accident has already released radioactive steam inside the building.

During the accident at the Fukushima nuclear plant in 2011, the operators did not open the valve manually, and the emergency system was activated too late and could not work for long. Operators did not know if they should have left the valves open or not when the tanks of two condensers were emptied of their water cooling.
