= Comparison of the Chernobyl and Fukushima nuclear accidents =

Comparison between the Chernobyl disaster and Fukushima nuclear disaster

To date, the nuclear accidents at the Chernobyl (1986) and Fukushima Daiichi (2011) nuclear power plants are the only INES level 7 nuclear accidents.

== Chernobyl and Fukushima nuclear accidents ==
The following table compares the Chernobyl and Fukushima nuclear accidents.

Plant Name	Chernobyl	Fukushima Daiichi
Location	Soviet Union (Ukrainian Soviet Socialist Republic) 51.38946°N 30.09914°E	Japan 37.4255°N 141.0216°E
Date of the accident	April 26, 1986	March 11, 2011
INES Level	7	
Plant commissioning date	1977	1971
Years of operation before the accident	9 years (plant): 2 years (Unit 4)	40 years (plant): 40 years (Unit 1); 37 years (Unit 2); 35 years (Unit 3); 33 years (Unit 4)
Electrical output	plant (net): 3700 MWe (4 reactors) reactors (net): 925 MWe (Units 1–4)	plant (net): 4546 MWe (6 reactors) reactors (net): 439 MWe (Unit 1), 760 MWe (Units 2–5), 1067 MWe (Unit 6)
Type of reactor	RBMK-1000 graphite moderated, 2nd generation reactor without containment	BWR-3 and BWR-4 reactors with Mark I containment vessels
Number of reactors	4 on site; 1 involved in accident	6 on site; 4 (and spent fuel pools) involved in accident; one of the four reactors was empty of fuel at the time of the accident.
Amount of nuclear fuel in affected reactors	1 reactor—190 tonnes (t, metric tons = 210 U.S. short tons): spent fuel pools not involved in incident	4 reactors—854 tonnes (t, metric tons): 81 t in Unit 1 reactor, 111 t in Unit 2 reactor, 111 t in Unit 3 reactor, 0 t in Unit 4 reactor (defueled), 59 t in Unit 1 spent fuel pool (SFP), 119 t in Unit 2 SFP, 104 t in Unit 3 SFP, and 269 t in Unit 4 SFP (Note: 183.3 kg/assembly; 400 assemblies in reactor 1, 548 assemblies in reactors 2&3, 0 assemblies in reactor 4, total of 1496 assemblies in reactors 1-4; 292 assemblies in Unit 1 spent fuel pool (SFP), 587 assemblies in Unit 2 SFP, 514 assemblies in Unit 3 SFP, 1331 assemblies in Unit 4 SFP, total of 2724 assemblies in spent fuel pools 1-4.)
Cause of the accident	Proximate cause was human error and violation of procedures. The unsafe reactor design caused instability at low power due to a positive void coefficient and steam formation. When an improper test was conducted at 1:23 AM at low power, the reactor became prompt critical. This was followed by a steam explosion that exposed the fuel, a raging fire, and a core meltdown. The fire lasted for days to weeks, and there is controversy over whether it was the fuel burning, nuclear decay heating or whether the graphite moderator that made up most of the core was involved. See Chernobyl Disaster, Note 1, for more discussion.	The plants were not designed with consideration of such a large tsunami concurrently occurring with the ground sinking. Subsequent review did not lead to mitigation. A major earthquake and tsunami caused the destruction of power lines and backup generators. Once the plants were without external power and the generators were flooded, a catastrophic decay heat casualty ensued, leading to major reactor plant damage including meltdowns.
Maximum level of radiation detected	300 Sv/h shortly after the explosion in vicinity of the reactor core.	530 Sv/h inside Unit 2 containment vessel in 2017 according to Japan Times.
Radioactivity released	According to IAEA, total release was 14 EBq (14,000 PBq). 5.2 EBq (5,200 PBq) in iodine-131 equivalent	As of 2014, a peer reviewed estimate of the total was 340–780 PBq, with 80% falling into the Pacific Ocean. Radiation continues to be released into the Pacific via groundwater.
Area affected	An area up to 500 kilometres (310 mi) away contaminated, according to the United Nations.	Radiation levels exceeding annual limits seen over 60 kilometres (37 mi) to northwest and 40 kilometres (25 mi) to south-southwest, according to officials.
Exclusion Zone Area	30 km	20 km (30 km voluntary) extending north-west to 45 km in the downwind direction to Iitate, Fukushima
Population relocated	335,000 (About 115,000 from areas surrounding the reactor in 1986; about 220,000 people from Belarus, the Russian Federation and Ukraine after 1986)	154,000
Population returned	None	122,000
Direct fatalities from the accident	Two immediate trauma deaths; 28 deaths from acute radiation syndrome out of 134 showing symptoms; four from an industrial accident (helicopter crash); 15 deaths from radiation-genic thyroid cancers (as of 2005); as many as 4,000 to 90,000 cancer related deaths.	1 confirmed cancer death attributed to radiation exposure by the government for the purpose of compensation following opinions from a panel of radiologists and other experts, medical sources pending for long-term fatalities due to the radiation.
Current status	All reactors were shut down by 2000. The damaged reactor was covered by a hastily built steel and concrete structure called the sarcophagus. A New Safe Confinement structure was installed in November 2016, from which the plant will be cleaned up and decommissioned.	Cold shutdown declared on 16 December 2011, but decommissioning is likely to take 30 to 40 years. All fuel rods in reactor 4 pool removed. Fukushima disaster cleanup is ongoing.

== Radioactive contamination discharge ==
Report date	Place	Period	Iodine-131 (TBq)		Caesium-137 (TBq)		Source
Report date	Place	Period	from	to	from	to	Source
2002	Chernobyl	25 April – June 1986	1,600,000	1,940,000	59,000	111,000	NEA
22 March 2011	Fukushima	12 – 15 March 2011	400,000		3,000	30,000	ZAMG
2 April 2011	Fukushima	12 – 19 March 2011	10,000	700,001	1,000	70,000	ZAMG
12 April 2011	Fukushima	11 March – 5 April	150,000		12,000		NSC
12 April 2011	Fukushima	11 – 17 March 2011	130,000		6,100		NISA
7 June 2011	Fukushima	11 – 17 March 2011	160,000		15,000		NISA
24 Aug. 2011	Fukushima	11 March – 5 April	130,000		11,000		NSC
15 Sept. 2011	Fukushima	March – September	100,000	200,000	10,000	20,000	Kantei

Report date	Place	Period	Amount (TBq)	Source
12 April 2011	Chernobyl	25 April – June 1986	5,200,000	NISA
12 April 2011	Fukushima	11 March – 5 April 2011	630,000	NSC
12 April 2011	Fukushima	11 – 17 March 2011	370,000	NISA
April 2011	Fukushima	4 April 2011	154	NSC
25 April 2011	Fukushima	24 April 2011	24	NSC
6–7 June 2011	Fukushima	11 – 17 March 2011	770,000	NISA
7 June 2011	Fukushima	11 – 17 March 2011	840,000	NISA, press printing
17 August 2011	Fukushima	3–16 August 2011	0.07	Government
23 August 2011	Fukushima	12 March - 5 April 2011	630,000	NISA

Report date	Period	Into the sea (TBq)		Source
Report date	Period	direct	indirect	Source
21 May 2011	1 – 6 April 2011	4,700		Tepco
End of August 2011	March – August 2011	3,500	16,000	JMA
8 September 2011	March – April 2011	15,000		Scientist Group
29 October 2011	21 March – 15 July 2011	27,100		IRSN

== See also ==
- Comparison of Chernobyl and other radioactivity releases
- Deaths due to the Chernobyl disaster
- List of accidents at the Mayak facility
