= Shutdown (nuclear reactor) =

State of a nuclear reactor with fission slowed or halted

Shutdown is the state of a nuclear reactor when the fission reaction is slowed significantly or halted completely. Different nuclear reactor designs have different definitions for what "shutdown" means, but it typically means that the reactor is not producing a measurable amount of electricity or heat and is in a stable condition with very low reactivity.

== Definition ==
The shutdown margin for nuclear reactors (that is, when the reactor is considered to be safely in a shutdown state) is usually defined either in terms of reactivity or dollars. For reactivity, this is calculated in units of delta-k/k, where k is equal to the criticality of the reactor (essentially, how fast and controlled the nuclear fission reaction is). It is sometimes also measured in dollars, where one dollar is equal to a reactor in prompt criticality, this can then be used to calculate the change in reactivity required to shut down or start up the reactor.

The shutdown margin for each reactor can either refer to the margin by which a reactor is subcritical with all its control rods inserted, or as the margin by which the reactor would be shut down in the event of a SCRAM. This margin has to be considered carefully for each reactor and reactor design, to ensure that it remains within the technical specifications and limitations of the reactor.

== Neutron poisoning ==
A reactor can be unintentionally "shut down" by having an excess of neutron poisons in the reactor vessel. Neutron poisons are chemical byproducts of the nuclear reaction which absorb neutrons, lowering reactivity in the reactor and potentially stalling the reaction if enough poisons are allowed to build up.

An example of this would be the Chernobyl disaster in 1986, when Reactor No. 4 suffered from a serious xenon-135 poisoning, which pushed the reactor into an unstable condition which later caused the accident. While neutron poisoning is not considered a shutdown in and of itself, it often requires that the reactor be shut down while the poisons are flushed from the system, as they can destabilise the reactor and cause it to behave unpredictably.

Certain reactors, such as the CANDU reactor design (where it is called EPIS, or Emergency Poison Injection System), employ this phenomenon as part of their SCRAM procedure. When a SCRAM occurs, neutron poisons are injected into the reactor to immediately lower the reactivity of the reactor, at the same time or slightly prior to other shutdown mechanisms, such as control rods.

== Cold shutdown ==
The difference between a normal (hot) shutdown and a cold shutdown is essentially that the fuel has gone completely or almost completely cold. In a typical shutdown, regular levels of coolant are still required, and the fuel remains reasonably hot as it continues to react. In a cold shutdown, the coolant system is typically lowered to pump water at atmospheric pressure, and the reactor vessel remains below 93 °C (200 °F). This temperature is so low that the cooling water in a light-water reactor does not boil or vaporise even if the pressure in the cooling circuit drops completely. However no cold shutdown is possible after a core meltdown, as the structure of the fuel rods and the coolant circuit is destroyed and the residues react in an uncontrolled manner, even if the pressure and temperature fulfil the conditions for cold shutdown, at least temporarily.

A cold shutdown is generally employed when operators need to access the reactor vessel for maintenance, fuel replenishing, or when the reactor has suffered damage of some kind that requires repairs. When a reactor is in cold shutdown, the fuel and control rods can be safely removed and exchanged, and maintenance can be performed. However, once a reactor has gone into a cold shutdown, it requires more time and energy to restart the chain reaction than if it had been in hot shutdown.

== See also ==
- Iodine pit
